= List of NYU Stern people =

This article lists notable people associated with the New York University Stern School of Business in the areas of academia, business, politics, government, and entertainment.

== Academia ==
Edward Altman	Economist	Professor, 1977–	Inventor of the "Altman Z-Score"
Menachem Brenner		Professor, 1990–	Professor of Finance; Bank and Financial Analysts Faculty Fellow
Jennifer N. Carpenter		Professor, 1995–	Associate Professor of Finance
Aswath Damodaran		Professor, 1986–	Professor of Finance; Kerschner Family Chair of Finance Education
W. Edwards Deming	Statistician	Professor, 1946–1993	Quality expert
Peter F. Drucker	The "father of modern management"	1950–1972	Presidential Medal of Freedom 2002
Edwin Elton	Economist	Nomura Professor of Finance; academic director of Stern Doctoral Program 1965–	Co-author of modern portfolio theory
Robert F. Engle	Economist	Professor, 1999–	2003 Nobel Prize in Economics
Niall Ferguson	Historian	2002–2004	Herzog Chair of Financial History; now at Harvard
Ken Froewiss		Professor, 1997–	Clinical professor of Finance; academic director of executive programs
John Anderson Fry		Administrator, 2002–	President of Drexel University and Franklin & Marshall College
Dan Gode		Professor, 1998–	Clinical associate professor of Accounting
Charles Waldo Haskins		Founding dean, 1900–1903	Co-founder of Haskins and Sells (now Deloitte)
Friedrich Hayek	Economist	Postgraduate, 1923–1924	1974 Nobel Prize in Economics
Deepak Hegde	Economist	Professor, 2010–	Seymour Milstein Professor of Strategy; professor of Management
Richard Hendler	Lawyer	Professor, 1989–	Clinical associate professor of Law in Business
Wassily Leontief	Economist	Professor, 1975–1999	1973 Nobel Prize in Economics
Alexander Ljungqvist		Professor, 2000–	Research professor of Finance; Ira Rennert Professor of Entrepreneurship; research director, Berkley Center
Sonia Marciano		Professor, 1997–	Clinical associate professor of Management and Organizations
Thomas Pugel		Professor, 1978–	Vice dean of executive programs; professor of Economics and Global Business
Nouriel Roubini	Economist	Professor	Professor of Economics; Robert Stansky Research Faculty Fellow
Thomas J. Sargent	Economist	Professor, 2002–	2011 Nobel Prize in Economics
Anthony Saunders		Professor, 1978–	John M. Schiff Professor of Finance
Robert Seamans	Economist	Professor, 2009–	Director of the Center for the Future of Management; professor of Management and strategy
Kristen Sosulski		Executive director of Learning Science Lab, 2011–	Clinical associate professor of Technology, Operations and Statistics
Michael Spence	Economist	Professor, 2011–	2001 Nobel Prize in Economics
Richard Sylla	Economist	Professor, 1990–	History of Financial Institutions and Markets professor
David Yermack		Professor, 1994–	Albert Fingerhut Professor of Finance and Business Transformation
Philip S. Yu	Distinguished professor and Wexler Chair; author	M.B.A., 1982	IBM (formerly); University of Illinois at Chicago
Eitan Zemel		Professor, 1998–	Vice dean of Strategic Initiatives; W. Edwards Deming Professor of Quality and Productivity
Larry Zicklin	Philanthropist	Professor, 1999–	Clinical professor at Stern; Neuberger Berman's chairman of the board
Stanley E. Zin	Economist	William R. Berkley Professor of Economics and Business, 2009–	Epstein-Zin preferences

== Business ==
Name	Title	Degree	Company
George S. Barrett	Chairman and CEO	M.B.A.	Cardinal Health, Inc.
Robert M. Beall II	Chairman	M.B.A.	Bealls
Anjelina Belakovskaia	Grandmaster; professor	M.S., 2001	U.S. Women's Chess Champion (1995, 1996, 1999); University of Arizona
Nicolas Berggruen	Investments, billionaire	B.S.	Berggruen Institute
William R. Berkley	President, entrepreneur	B.S., 1966	W. R. Berkley Corporation
Thor Bjorgolfsson	Entrepreneur	B.S.	Iceland's first billionaire
Tom Chrystie	CFO	M.B.A., 1960	Merrill
James Cracchiolo	CEO	B.S., 1980; M.B.A., 1985	Ameriprise Financial
John J. Creedon	Former CEO and chairman	B.S., 1955; J.D., 1957	MetLife
Thomas E. Dooley	CEO	M.B.A., 1984	Viacom
Joseph Eichler	Real estate entrepreneur	B.S. before 1925	Eichler Homes, a real estate development company completing over 11,000 new homes in California between 1949 and 1966
Israel Englander	Billionaire hedge fund manager	B.A.	Millennium Management
James Ferragamo	Corporate director	M.B.A.	Ferragamo
Lorenzo Fertitta	Chairman and CEO; vice chairman	M.B.A., 1993	Zuffa LLC entity of Ultimate Fighting Championship; Station Casinos Inc.
Tom Freston	CEO	M.B.A.	MTV Networks
Richard S. Fuld, Jr.	CEO	M.B.A., 1973	Lehman Brothers
Jeff Gaspin	Chairman	M.B.A., 1984	NBCUniversal Television Group
Abraham George	Entrepreneur and philanthropist	M.B.A., 1973; PhD., 1975	Founder of Multinational Computer Models and the George Foundation
Edward P. Gilligan	Entrepreneur; company president		American Express
Alan Greenspan	Banker	B.A., 1948; M.A., 1950; PhD, 1977	Former chairman of the Federal Reserve
Robert Greifeld	CEO and president	M.B.A., 1986	NASDAQ Stock Market, Inc.
Gerald Hassell	CEO	M.B.A.	BNY Mellon
Paul Kangas	Journalist	M.B.A.	Host, Nightly Business Report
Henry Kaufman	Banker	B.S., 1948; PhD, 1958	Wall Street financial consultant
Jeffrey Koo	CEO banker	M.B.A., 1962	China Trust Bank
Peter S. Kraus	Chairman and CEO	M.B.A.	AllianceBernstein
Kenneth Langone	Entrepreneur	M.B.A., 1960	Founder, Home Depot
Alan Levin	CFO	M.B.A., 1976	Pfizer
Ismail Merchant	Filmmaker	M.B.A., 1960	Founder, Merchant Ivory Productions
Philip L. Milstein	Chairman, heir	M.B.A., 1974	Emigrant Bank
Cathy E. Minehan	Bank president	M.B.A., 1977	Federal Reserve Bank of Boston
Vanessa O'Brien	Mountaineer, businesswoman	M.B.A.	First woman to reach Earth's highest and lowest points; fastest woman to climb the Seven Summits
Mark Patterson	Co-founder, chairman	M.B.A.	MatlinPatterson Global Advisers LLC
John Paulson	Billionaire hedge fund manager	B.S.	President, Paulson & Co.
Richard C. Perry	Billionaire entrepreneur	MBA	Perry Capital and current owner of Barneys New York
Michael Posner	Lawyer; NYU Stern director	J.D.	NYU Stern Center for Business and Human Rights
Ira Rennert	Billionaire	M.B.A.	AM General
James B. Rosenwald III	Entrepreneur; NYU Stern adjunct professor	M.B.A.	Dalton Investments; Stern School of Business
Edouard de Rothschild	Banker	M.B.A., 1985	Rothschild & Co
Juan Antonio Samaranch Salisachs	Banker; IOC vice president	M.B.A.	GBS Finanzas; International Olympic Committee
Charles W. Scharf	CEO	M.B.A	Wells Fargo
Daniel Schulman	CEO and president	M.B.A	Current CEO of Verizon, former CEO and president of PayPal
Allan L. Schuman	CEO	B.S., 1955	Ecolab
Leonard N. Stern	CEO, the Hartz Group	B.S., 1957; M.B.A., 1959	Namesake of New York University Stern School of Business
Henry Taub	President	B.S., 1947	Taub Foundation
Laurence Alan Tisch	Billionaire, president and CEO	BSc, 1942	CBS
Agnes Varis	Entrepreneur, founder	M.A., 1977; M.B.A., 1979	Aegis Pharmaceuticals
Paul Waterman	CEO	M.B.A., 1996	Castrol, Elementis
David Yaari	Entrepreneur, activist, chairman	M.B.A.	World Confederation of United Zionists
Avi Yashchin	Businessman and entrepreneur	M.B.A	CleanEdison
Peggy Yu	Founder and chairperson	M.B.A., 1992	Dangdang
Peter Zaffino	Chairman and CEO	M.B.A.	AIG
Barry Zyskind	Chairman and CEO	M.B.A.	AmTrust Financial Services

== Entertainment ==
Tempestt Bledsoe	B.S., 1994	Actress of The Cosby Show
Emira D'Spain		Model, social media influencer, beauty director of Paper
Carole Radziwill	M.B.A.	Journalist, author, and television personality
Charlotte Wells	M.B.A./M.F.A.	Movie writer and director
Cathy Yan	M.B.A./M.F.A.	TV writer and director

== Politics and government ==
Rudy Boschwitz	M.B.A., 1950, J.D., 1953	United States Senate
Isidore Dollinger	B.C.S., 1925	United States House of Representatives (1949–1959)
William J. Healy II	M.B.A.	member of the Ohio House of Representatives; mayor of Canton, Ohio
Manuel Pinho	Visiting scholar	Portuguese Minister of Economy and Innovation (2005–2009)
Charles B. Rangel	B.S., 1957	United States House of Representatives
Chris Shays	M.B.A., 1974, MPA, 1978	United States House of Representatives
Cynthia Villar	M.B.A., 1972	Senator of the Philippines

== Sports ==
- Peter Westbrook (1952-2024), B.S. in Marketing, 1975, Olympic fencing bronze medalist and 13-time national champion
