= Schuman =

Schuman is a surname, compare: Schumann, Shuman. Notable people with the surname include:

- Aaron Schuman (born 1977), American photographer, writer, curator and educator
- Adolph Schuman, American businessman
- Allan L. Schuman, American former CEO
- Almamy Schuman Bah (born 1974), Guinean footballer
- Burt Schuman
- Daniel Schuman, American lawyer
- David Schuman (1944–2019), American judge and attorney
- Erin Schuman, American neurobiologist
- Freddy Schuman, American baseball spectator
- Frederick L. Schuman, American historian
- Howard Schuman (1928–2021), American sociologist and professor of sociology
- Joel S. Schuman, American ophthalmologist
- Kenneth Schuman, Government official, business executive, social work administrator
- Tom Schuman, American musician
- Patricia G. Schuman, American librarian
- Reg Schuman, Australian rugby league footballer
- Robert Schuman, Prime Minister of France from 1947 to 1948
- Scott Schuman, American blogger and fashion photographer
- Stacey Dales-Schuman or Stacey Dales (born 1979), Canadian basketball player and sports reporter
- Tom Schuman, American musician
- William Schuman (1910-1992), American composer and arts administrator
