= Model N =

Model N can refer to:

- Curtiss Model N, a floatplane
- Ford Model N, an automobile by the Ford Motor Company
- Model N Engine, by the Ford Motor Company
- Model N (company), a software company
