= Tom Naratil =

American business executive

- Born: Thomas Christopher Naratil; 1 December 1961 (age 64); United States
- Education: Yale University; New York University Stern School of Business
- Occupation: Business executive
- Years active: 1983–present
- Employer: UBS Group AG
- Board member of: American Swiss Foundation, Consultors for the College of Nursing at Villanova University, UBS Americas Holding LLC
- Spouse: Wendy Naratil
- Children: 5

Thomas C. Naratil (born 1961) is an American business executive in the financial industry. After serving as president of both UBS Wealth Management Americas and UBS Americas since early 2016, Naratil was appointed CEO of UBS Americas Holding LLC and became co-president of Global Wealth Management of UBS Group AG and UBS AG in early 2018.

Naratil started his career in finance in 1983 when he joined the brokerage firm Paine Webber Jackson & Curtis. The Swiss bank UBS acquired PaineWebber in 2000 and Naratil would hold various senior management positions at UBS Group, including chief financial officer (CFO) and chief operating officer (COO) from 2014 to 2015. Naratil succeeded Robert McCann as president of both UBS Wealth Management Americas and UBS Americas. In 2016, Naratil led a reorganization that involved cutting recruitment of US advisors and thinning management ranks, while also increasing compensation for UBS advisors.

He is on the boards of organizations such as the American Swiss Foundation and College of Nursing at Villanova University, and has served on its Clearing House Supervisory Board.

== Early life and education ==
Thomas C. Naratil was born in 1961 in the United States. After earning a Bachelor of Arts degree in history from Yale University in 1983, he earned a Master of Business Administration degree in economics from New York University's Stern School of Business in 1990. Naratil served in the United States Army Reserve for six years.

== Career ==
=== 1983-2008: UBS PaineWebber ===
In July 1983 Naratil joined the American brokerage firm Paine Webber Jackson & Curtis through its corporate intern program. He became a trading assistant in the firm’s taxed fixed income (TFI) unit in January 1985, and the unit later appointed him manager of risk, origination, sales, and marketing. From 1987 to 1993 Naratil co-managed the TFI unit’s government and federal agency trading desk, and in 1994 he became PaineWebber's TFI director. The Swiss bank UBS acquired PaineWebber in 2000, renaming it UBS PaineWebber in 2001. Initially appointed director of UBS PaineWebber’s investment products group, in 2002 the division appointed him director of its transactions products group and director of banking and transactional solutions. In 2003 UBS PaineWebber was renamed UBS Wealth Management USA.

UBS selected Naratil as its global head of market strategy and development in 2005. In that role, he was responsible for "the sales, marketing and trading of all taxable debt, convertible securities and preferred stock" of UBS. In 2007 he was named UBS's global head of marketing, segment and client development. During the 2008 financial crisis, he served as head of UBS’s Auction Rate Securities Solutions Group.

=== 2009-2015: UBS CFO and COO ===
In 2009 Naratil was appointed chief financial officer (CFO) and chief risk officer (CRO) of UBS Wealth Management Americas, a role he held until 2011. In May 2011 he began serving as UBS’s global CFO, moving from the United States to Zurich, Switzerland to succeed John Cryan as both CFO and a member of UBS's Group Executive Board, which Naratil joined on June 1, 2011. On January 1, 2014, he was named UBS’s chief operating officer (COO) in addition to his CFO responsibilities. He retained both his COO and CFO roles until the end of 2015.

=== 2016-2018: president of UBS Americas and UBS Wealth Management Americas ===
==== Appointment ====
Naratil succeeded Robert McCann as president of both UBS Wealth Management Americas and UBS Americas on January 1, 2016, tasked by UBS executives with "extending the brokerage’s profit beyond roughly $1 billion annually." The Wall Street Journal wrote that Naratil was expected to continue the unit’s focus on "primarily serving clients who have millions of dollars to invest." In May 2016 Naratil created an alliance with the financial technology company SigFig to create fintech products for UBS, among them a digital platform to support his financial advisors.

==== Wealth Management Americas re-organization ====
Naratil led a reorganization at UBS’s US wealth management arm in June 2016 to "push decision-making authority down to the firm’s 208 local managers," giving managers control of their team structures, allocation of marketing and event resources, and pricing for services and products. The reorganization involved cutting recruitment of US advisors by 40 percent annually, as well as thinning management ranks. Around 60 senior executives and support staff "sandwiched between upper management and the local level" were redeployed or cut, with Naratil eliminating 20 percent of the managing directors and 10% of the executive directors working from UBS Americas’ home office. With the funds saved from reducing overhead, Naratil built "a SWAT team of roving experts," including specialist-lending and technology experts, to work with local advisors. Also as part of the restructuring, he oversaw a simplification of the arm’s compensation plan. Taking effect in 2017, Naratil said no advisor would get less cash under the plan, which left base pay levels for advisors unchanged. Beyond increasing pay to select advisors and pay to advisors with the most business, the changes also offered incentives for working in teams, bringing in new business, and selling client books within the firm upon retiring. "Following UBS's lead," Merrill Lynch and Morgan Stanley also announced plans in 2017 to change their recruitment and compensation plans.

=== 2018-2022: co-president of Global Wealth Management of UBS Group AG and UBS AG and CEO of UBS Americas Holding LLC. ===
In January 2018, Naratil was appointed CEO of UBS Americas Holding LLC.

In February 2018, became co-president of Global Wealth Management of UBS Group AG and UBS AG alongside Martin Blessing. Iqbal Khan succeeded Blessing, becoming Naratil’s co-president, on October 1, 2019.

Interviewed by Bloomberg in late March 2020, Naratil observed that, during the COVID-19 pandemic, “The biggest difference between now and 2008 is that the banks are a source of strength rather than the source of the problem”.

== Memberships and directorships ==
Naratil is involved with several corporate and philanthropic boards. He is on the board of the American Swiss Foundation and the board of consultors for the College of Nursing at Villanova University. He has also served on Villanova's Clearing House Supervisory Board.

== Writing and public speaking ==
Naratil has written for publications such as Business Insider and The Hill on financial and economic matters. He has also been interviewed by networks and newspapers such as CNBC, Fox Business, Reuters, and Bloomberg TV.

== Personal life ==
Naratil and his wife Wendy have five children, three of whom also work in the financial services industry, and reside in New Jersey. In 2013, Yale University accepted an endowment from Naratil and his wife to fund the Wendy U. and Thomas C. Naratil Pioneer Award, which supports "an investigation that is either highly inventive or close to a major breakthrough in advancing women’s health — where funding is needed to reach its aims."

== See also ==
- List of Yale University people
- List of NYU Stern people
