= Deepak Hegde =

American Economist and professor of innovation, policy, and entrepreneurship

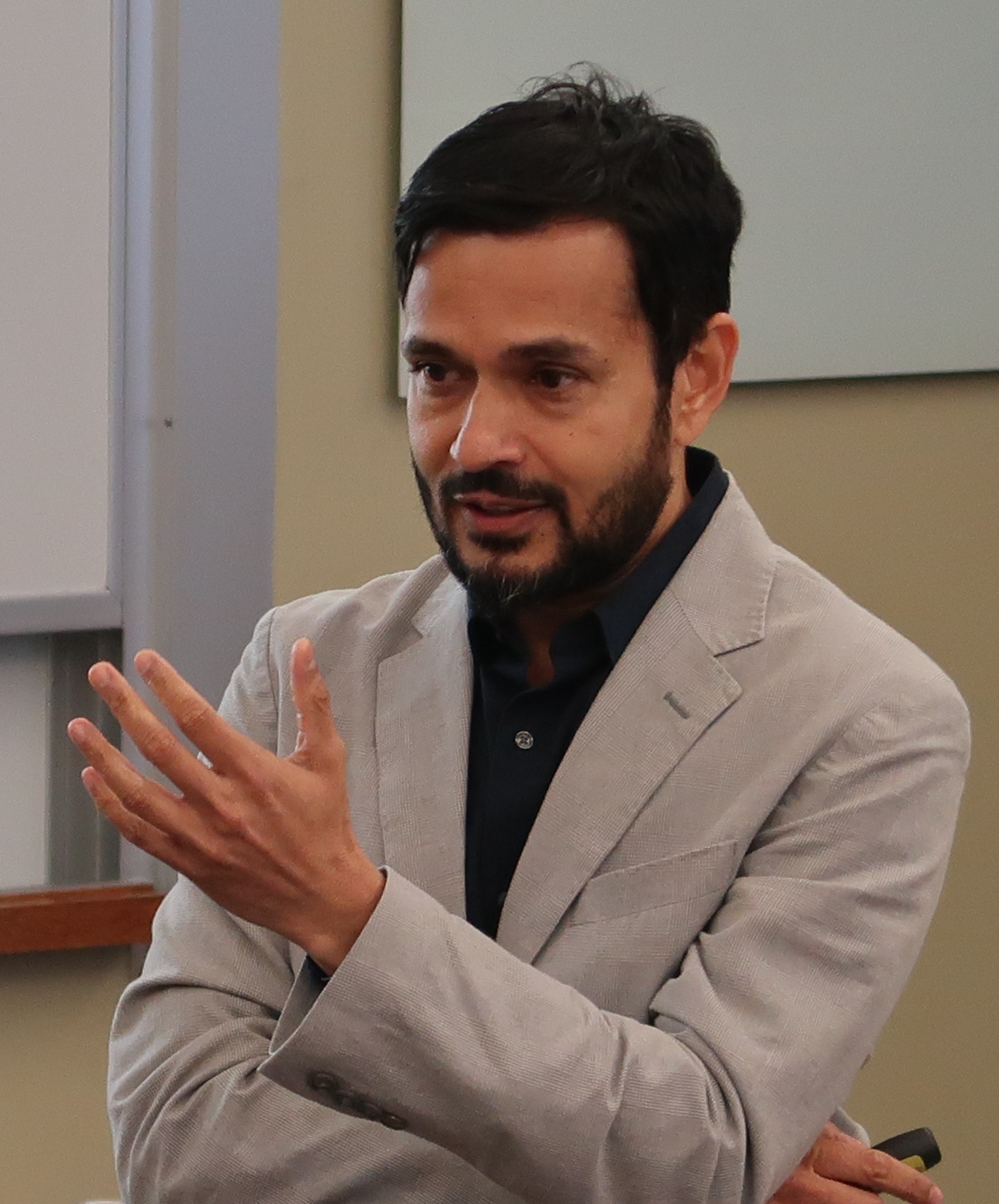
- Hegde in a 2023 lecture
- Born: November 5, 1977 (age 48); Yellapur, India
- Citizenship: American
- Title: Seymour Milstein Professor of Strategy; Professor of Management

Academic background
- Education: National Institute of Engineering; Georgia Institute of Technology; University of California, Berkeley

Academic work
- Discipline: Technological innovation, Entrepreneurship, Political economy and public policy
- Institutions: New York University Stern School of Business
- Website: www.dhegde.com

Deepak Hegde (born November 5, 1977) is an Indian American business scholar who is the Seymour Milstein Professor of Strategy at the New York University, Stern School of Business.

Hegde is best known for his study of how innovation and entrepreneurship is shaped by public policy and private business practices. Notably he has offered evidence for the benefits of speedy approval and early publishing of patents. He has also studied multiple factors that impact entrepreneurship, including asymmetry of information on employee qualifications, the relevance of shared ethnic backgrounds, and bankruptcy protection regimes.

Hegde is also the founder and director of entrepreneurship programs notable for their practical pedagogy in helping real-life start-ups commercialize scientific innovations by bringing together scientists, business managers, and investors.

== Biography ==
=== Early life and education ===
Hegde was born in Yellapur in Karnataka, India. He graduated from the National Institute of Engineering in Karnataka in 2000 with a bachelor's degree in industrial engineering. In 2004 he earned a master's degree in public policy from the Georgia Institute of Technology, and in 2010 he completed his PhD in Business and Public Policy from the University of California, Berkeley.

Hegde has credited professors David C. Mowery, Bronwyn Hall, and Bhaven Sampat, as mentors influential in his work.

=== Academic career ===
Hegde joined the New York University's Stern School of Business as Professor of Management in 2010, received tenure in 2016, and became a full professor in 2020. In 2023 he was appointed to the chaired professorship Seymour Milstein Professor of Strategy.

Hegde has taught courses on business strategy, innovation, and entrepreneurship. He has researched how entrepreneurs and innovators bring their ideas to market, especially within science and technology intensive industries.

Hegde serves or has served in editorial positions at academic journals including the Journal of Economics & Management Strategy, Organization Science, Management Science, and Strategic Entrepreneurship Journal.

Hegde has also been a visiting scholar at the U.S. Patent and Trademark Office (USPTO) and subsequently was named Thomas Alva Edison Scholar to study how past policies have affected the USPTO patent quality metrics and the patent examination quality.

=== Practical entrepreneurship programs ===
Since 2017 Hegde has launched multiple practical entrepreneurship programs at NYU, including the Endless Frontier Labs program in 2019. These programs are notable for their innovative pedagogy in helping real startups commercialize scientific and technological innovations, by bringing together the scientists who developed these innovations, business managers that can run the startups, and venture capitalists that can provide the necessary funding.

Hegde is also the academic director of NYU's Berkley Center for Entrepreneurship, which provides education, coaching, and funding for startups.

=== Awards and accolades ===
In 2012 Hegde was named a Kauffman Junior Faculty Fellow in Entrepreneurship Research – an award that recognized scholars who exhibit the potential to make significant contributions to the body of research in the field of entrepreneurship.

In 2015 Hegde was listed among the top 40 MBA professors under the age of 40 by Poets & Quants.

For his innovative pedagogy and impact on the practice of entrepreneurship, he received the 2018 NYU Stern School of Business Faculty Leadership Award, and the 2022 Entrepreneurship Pedagogy Award by the Academy of Management. Hegde has also received distinguished teaching awards.

== Notable research ==
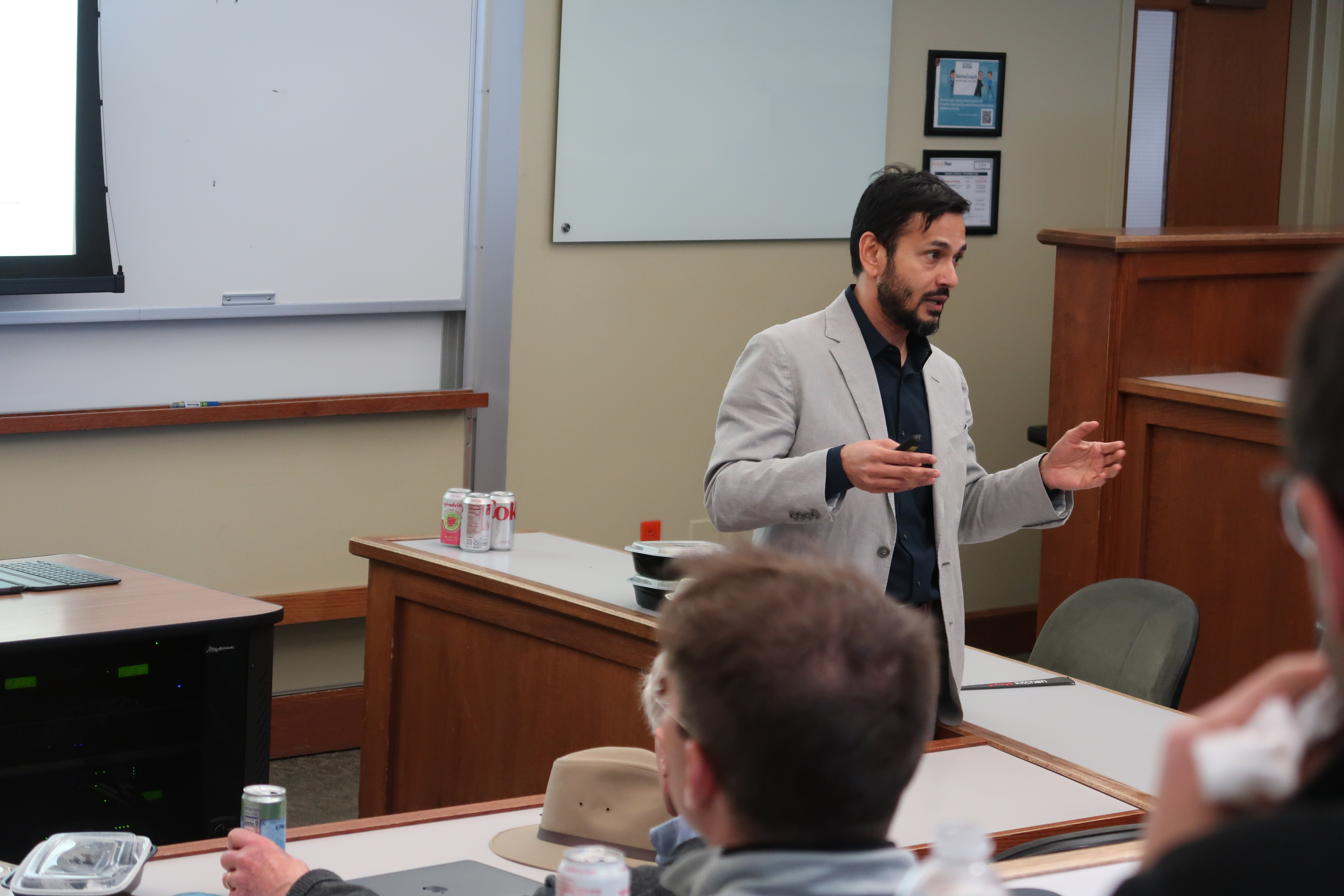
Hegde at a university seminar presenting a paper (2023)

Hegde has studied the consequences of business practices and public policy on innovation and entrepreneurship. His research on entrepreneurship notably showed that workers with skills greater than what their résumés suggest gravitate towards entrepreneurship. Also that shared ethnic backgrounds among investors and entrepreneurs led to superior investment returns. His innovation policy research offered evidence that speedy approval of a startup's first-time patent application significantly bolstered its growth and success; that earlier publishing of patent applications lead to faster licensing, diffusion, and innovation; and that increased complexity in the patent approval process put larger firms at an advantage over smaller ones.

=== Entrepreneurship ===
Hegde found that individuals with skills greater than what their résumés show are undervalued by employers and gravitate towards entrepreneurship. He posited that employers assess potential workers based on their educational qualifications, especially early in their careers when there is little direct information on their work accomplishments and productivity. This leads those who correctly believe that they are better than their résumés show to become successful entrepreneurs. This not only applies to high-tech entrepreneurs, but everyone who chooses to be self-employed. The conclusion is that entrepreneurs have higher ability scores, lower levels of educational attainment, as well as greater and more variable earnings. This may explain why several groups with less credible ability signals, such as immigrants, gravitate toward entrepreneurship.

Also, Hegde found that venture capitalists (VCs) are more likely to invest in startups with executives from the same ethnic background, and that when VCs and entrepreneurs shared the same ethnicity, startups were more successful. This is likely not discrimination against others but instead reflect the benefits from closer VC-entrepreneur communication and coordination when they share the same ethnic background.

Hegde also found that more bankruptcy protections for debtors led to shrinking investments and innovation. Higher levels of bankruptcy exemptions (debtor protections where some assets cannot be used to repay creditors in a bankruptcy), meant greater risks for investors, in turn lowering their levels of capital investment. That made firms (especially small ones and in industries with high costs of innovation) to cut back on innovation expenditures, resulting in fewer patents and lower overall patent quality.

=== Patent approvals ===
Hegde found that the speedy approval of a startup's first-time patent application greatly bolstered its growth and success, with greater growth in revenue, employment, investor funding, and subsequent patent approvals. Conversely, the research also showed that when ultimately-approved patents experienced protracted review processes, those growth rates were significantly dampened. Hegde posited that patents facilitate information sharing between potential investors and startups, and generate more investments to fuel their growth. Entrepreneurs can more openly share inventions without fear of being misappropriated. Investors can more confidently invest in firms that hold patents as those serve as indicators of greater quality and potential success.

He also found that increased complexity in the patent approval process led to fewer approvals and put large firms at an advantage over small firms. His research showed that applications filed by large firms were more likely to result in patents than those filed by small firms, suggesting it was getting more difficult for small companies to get patents, while large companies had both the financial resources and time to wait out the lengthy and costly approval process.

=== Patent disclosures ===
Hegde also found that the earlier disclosure by the U.S Patent and Trademark Office of inventions through patent publication accelerated innovation. He found that a change in policy, where publication was shortened from 3–4 years to 18 months, accelerated further patenting and innovation.

Hegde also found, contrary to common belief, that a majority of investors chose to opt out of secrecy and publicly reveal their patent applications while they were still pending, to reap the benefits of informing potential investors and licensees. On the flip, side Hegde found that the least valuable and least-impactful patents were those that opted for pre-grant secrecy.

=== Politics of disease research funding ===
Hegde tested the supposedly political independence of the grant-making activities of the U.S. National Institutes of Health (NIH), tasked with funding disease research, through an independent and non-political peer-review system. Hegde nevertheless found that despite their merit-based aims, NIH grant decisions were skewed toward greater funding to rare disease research advocated by constituencies from states that had more members on the U.S House subcommittee with oversight of the NIH.

The U.S. Congress aimed to curb the power of lobbyists through a 2010 ban on setting aside money in bills for specific projects, known as earmarks. In response, lobby groups shifted strategies, seeking to steer funds using ‘soft’ earmarks: language in spending bills that encourages or urges an agency to perform some action, such as funding Alzheimer's research, rather than setting aside funds for it.

== Publications ==
=== Selected journal articles ===
- Hicks, Diana; Hegde, Deepak (June 2005). "Highly innovative small firms in the markets for technology". Research Policy. 34 (5): 703–716. doi:10.1016/j.respol.2005.03.008. hdl:1853/24060.
- Hegde, Deepak; Mowery, David C (2008). "Politics and funding in the US public biomedical R&D system". Science. 322 (5909): 1797–1798. doi:10.1126/science.1158562. PMID 19095928. S2CID 206513102.
- Hegde, Deepak; Mowery, David C; Graham, Stuart JH (2009). "Pioneering Inventors or Thicket Builders: Which US Firms Use Continuations in Patenting?". Management Science. 55 (7): 1214–1226. doi:10.1287/mnsc.1090.1016. S2CID 35244365.
- Hegde, Deepak; Tumlinson, Justin (May 2014). "Does social proximity enhance business partnerships? Theory and evidence from ethnicity's role in US venture capital". Management Science. 60 (9): 2355–2380. doi:10.1287/mnsc.2013.1878.
- Carley, Michael; Hegde, Deepak; Marco, Alan (2015). "What is the Probability of Receiving a U.S. Patent?". Yale Journal of Law and Technology. 17 (1): 204–224.
- Hegde, Deepak; Sampat, Bhaven (2015). "Can private money buy public science? Disease group lobbying and federal funding for biomedical research". Management Science. 61 (10): 2281–2298. doi:10.1287/mnsc.2014.2107.
- Graham, Stuart; Hegde, Deepak (January 16, 2015). "Disclosing patents' secrets - Inventors prefer to disclose know-how before patent grant". Science. 347 (6219): 236–237. doi:10.1126/science.1262080. PMID 25593175. S2CID 23732612.
- Cerqueiro, Geraldo; Hegde, Deepak; Penas, María Fabiana; Seamans, Robert C (2017). "Debtor rights, credit supply, and innovation". Management Science. 63 (10): 3311–3327. doi:10.1287/mnsc.2016.2509.
- Hegde, Deepak; Hong, Luo (February 2018). "Patent publication and the market for ideas". Management Science. 64 (2): 652–672. doi:10.1287/mnsc.2016.2622.
- Farre-Mensa, Joan; Hegde, Deepak; Ljungqvist, Alexander (November 2019). "What is a patent worth? Evidence from the US patent "lottery"". The Journal of Finance. 75 (2): 639–682. doi:10.1111/jofi.12867.
- Hegde, Deepak; Tumlinson, Justin (September 17, 2020). "Information frictions and entrepreneurship". Strategic Management Journal. 42 (3): 491–528. doi:10.1002/smj.3242. S2CID 219366909.
- Hegde, Deepak; Herkenhoff, Kyle; Zhu, Chenqi (July 1, 2023). "Patent publication and innovation". Journal of Political Economy. 131 (7). The University of Chicago Press: 1845–1903. doi:10.1086/723636.
