= CXE =

CXE can refer to:

- Caicos Express Airways, an airline based in the Turks and Caicos Islands, by ICAO code
- Chase City Municipal Airport, an airport in Chase City, Virginia, US, by FAA code; see List of airports in Virginia
- MFS High Income Municipal Trust, an American company listed on the New York Stock Exchange; see Companies listed on the New York Stock Exchange (M)
- Cosmic X-ray Experiment, an experiment performed by the High Energy Astronomy Observatory 1 telescope
