= Kumar Malavalli =

Indian American businessman (born 1943)

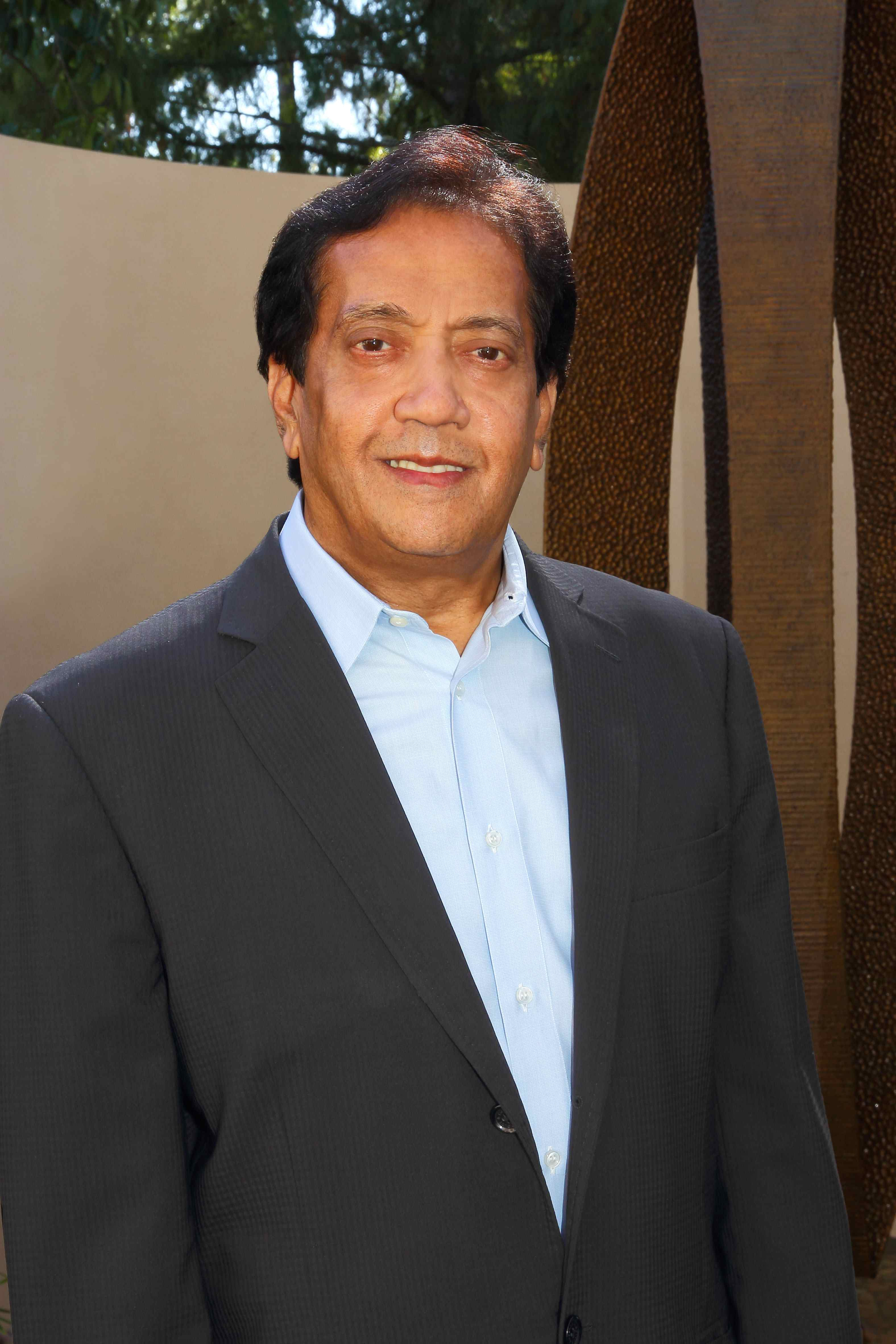
- Born: March 7, 1943 (age 83); Mysore, Karnataka, India
- Education: National Institute of Engineering, Mysore, India; Cal State East Bay Honorary Doctorate of Science
- Occupations: Chairman of C3DNA Inc. Co-founder, CTO Brocade Communications
- Board member of: Glassbeam, Inc. AlephCloud; C3DNA Inc.
- Spouse: Vijayalakshmi Malavalli
- Children: Ranjini Malavalli
- Father: Narayanaswamy Malavalli
- Relatives: Dr. Seetharam Malavalli; Dr. Shivaram Malavalli

Kumar Malavalli is an Indian American technology entrepreneur and philanthropist. In 1995, he founded Brocade Communications Systems with Paul Bonderson Jr. He currently serves as chairman of C3DNA Inc. and as a partner at VKRM Services, a boutique investment firm. He has also served on the boards of the Storage Networking Industry Association and the Fibre Channel Industry Association.

Malavalli was presented with an honorary doctor of science degree by California State University, East Bay in 2013. The Kumar Malavalli Endowed Chair in Storage Systems Research at the University of California Santa Cruz's Jack Baskin School of Engineering was established in 2004 following a $1 million donation from Malavalli. Professor Heiner Litz currently holds the Kumar Malavalli Chair.

Malavalli is a member of the Silicon Valley Engineering Hall of Fame.

== Early life and education ==
Malavalli was born in early March 1943 in Mysore, Karnataka, India. He moved to Düsseldorf, Germany in 1972 following his graduation from the National Institute of Engineering with a bachelor's degree in engineering. After graduating from the Institute of Engineering in Düsseldorf with a master's degree in industrial electronics, Malavalli moved to Toronto, Ontario, Canada.

== Career ==
In Toronto, Malavalli worked for Canstar Communications’ fibre channel group, which was later acquired by Hewlett-Packard. While at Hewlett-Packard, he served on American National Standards Institute's T11 Technical Committee, which established universal standards for fibre channel.

Malavalli co-founded Brocade Communications, a producer of storage area networks, with Paul Bonderson, Jr. in 1995. Brocade launched in 1998 and went public in May 1999, and its CEO was convicted for illegal backdating of options in January 2008. In addition to being a co-founder, Malavalli served as CTO of Brocade.

In 2001, Malavalli co-founded InMage, an independent software company.

He was awarded the International Committee for Information Technology Standards’ 2002 Gene Milligan Award for his work chairing an INCITS committee, which developed 17 standards for storage area networks.

In 2003, Malavalli became the first Indian member of the Silicon Valley Engineering Hall of Fame.

Malavalli co-founded Glassbeam, a software-as-a-service vendor, in 2009 with Puneet Pandit. He also serves as chairman of the company.

Malavalli was appointed InMage CEO in 2011.

Other companies whose boards Malavalli has served on include CryptoMill Technologies and LeadFormix (then-known as LeadForce1). He was also an investor in Edurite Technologies, which was later acquired by Pearson Education.

== Philanthropy ==
In 2004, Malavalli donated $1 million toward the creation of the University of California at Santa Cruz’s endowed Kumar Malavalli Chair in Storage Systems Research. He is also a benefactor of Stanford University's Institute for Economic Policy Research, with donations totaling over $500,000.

Malavalli is a co-founder and trustee of the Indus Trust, which builds schools that are not affordable by the middle class population of India. Hindu BL, The Indus Trust is headed by Lt. Gen. Arjun Ray. He is also the principle investor of TeleVital, a company that provides telemedicine services to rural areas in India.

Malavalli is the chairman and a funder of the India Community Center in Milpitas, California. He also serves as a trustee of the American India Foundation and Asian Art Museum of San Francisco. He sits on the board of The Indus Entrepreneurs’ Silicon Valley Chapter and the San Francisco-Bangalore Sister City Initiative.

In 2013, Malavalli was awarded the Immigrant Heritage Award for his philanthropic work in the United States and India.
