= Divya Deepa Charitable Trust =

Home for Learning
- Kaliyuva Mane
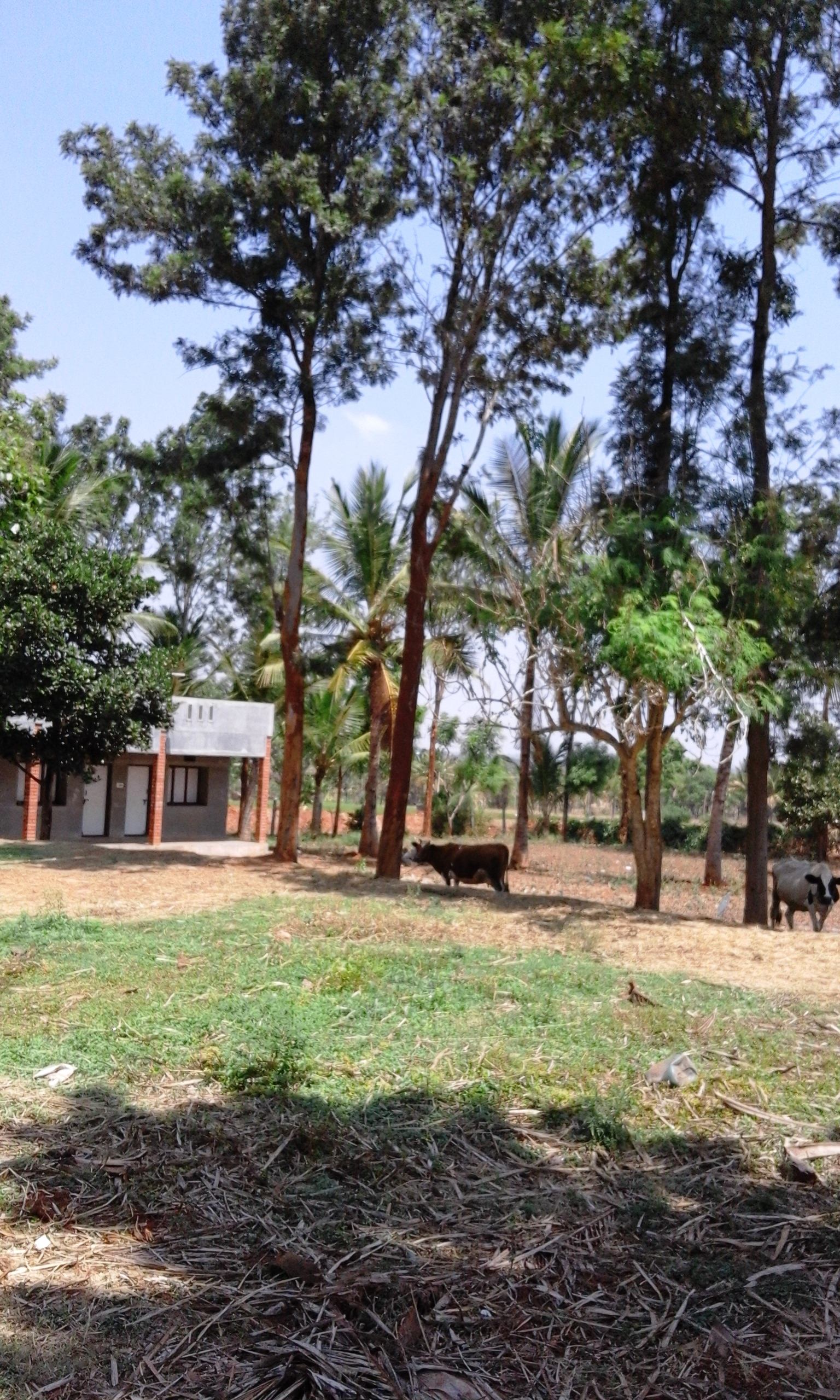
- Kaliyuva Mane, a special school for the underprivileged children.

Location
- Manandavadi Road; Kenchalagudu village Rayanakere post Jayapura hobli, Mysore, India, Karnataka, 570008

Information
- Motto: School for children, not children for school
- Established: 4 March 1999
- Founder: Ananth Kumar
- Website: divyadeepatrust.org

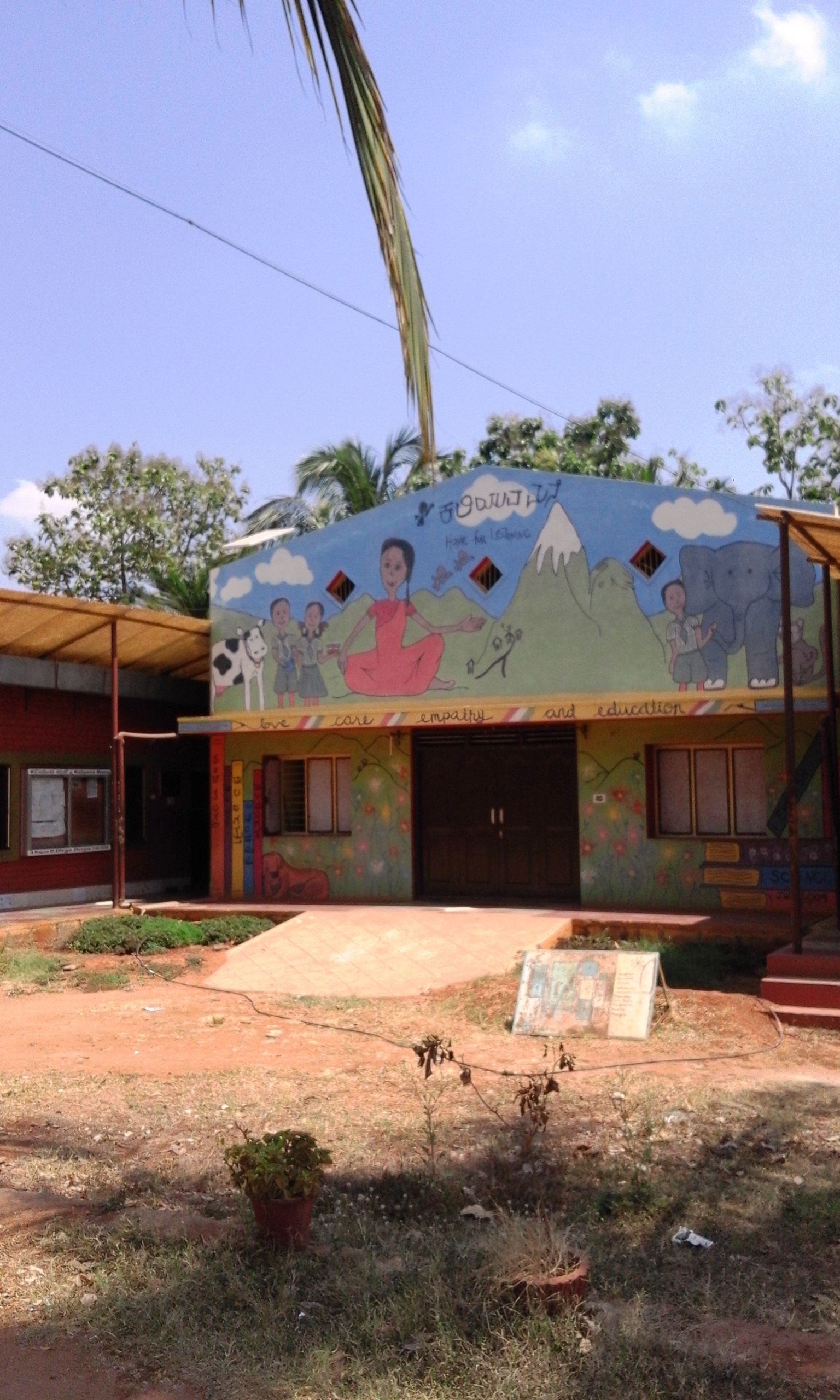
Kaliyuva Mane school

Divya Deepa Charitable Trust is an NGO established in Mysore, India which runs Kaliyuva Mane, an alternative school for the underprivileged children in and around Kenchalagudu village where it is situated.

The mission of the trust is to create a replicable model of educating out of system - opportunity deprived children.

== Kaliyuva Mane ==
The school, mostly populated by school dropouts from conventional schools, helps rural children appear for SSLC examination of Karnataka state. An example of the alternate modes of teaching is the kid's bank inside the campus in which all students have personal savings account.

== Volunteers ==
Many undergraduate students from SJCE, National Institute of Engineering, Mysore Medical College and Vidya Vardhaka College of Engineering and some IT professionals based in Bangalore are volunteers of the trust. The trust often conducts various fundraising activities in Mysore city. The volunteers involve themselves in a unique activity called paper empowerment in which they collect old newspapers from houses in Mysore and sell them to raise money, apart from setting up stalls, and designing and selling greeting cards. They also take up informal teaching at the school.

== Recognition ==
The school has no government recognition as a school, despite its successful history, because of the way it is structured, not conforming to standards. But it has been recognized as a charitable trust.

Notable people like N. R. Narayana Murthy, the founder of Infosys have been reported to have visited the school

== Achievements ==
In Spark the Rise competition sponsored by Mahindra, the trust ended up as the second runner up from ideas all over India.

Six students were mainstreamed in May 2012 when they passed the SSLC examination of Karnataka State.

== See also ==
- Kenchalagudu
- Kaliyuva Mane School, Mysore
