= Barry Zyskind =

US businessman in the insurance industry

Barry Dov Zyskind
- Born: 1971 (age 54–55); Los Angeles, California, US
- Education: New York University Stern School of Business
- Occupations: Chairman, CEO
- Employer: AmTrust Financial Services
- Spouse: Esther Karfunkel Zyskind
- Family: George Karfunkel (uncle); Michael Karfunkel (father-in-law)

Barry Zyskind is an American businessman in the insurance industry, and head of AmTrust Financial Services Inc. In the September 2016 edition of Best's Review, an A.M. Best publication, AmTrust was ranked the 11th largest commercial insurer in the US, up from 128th position in 2005. In the interview, CEO Zyskind attributed AmTrust's growth to its 'focus on small commercial customers, its proprietary technology platform, and its extensive database of loss history to help appropriately price and structure policies.'

== Early life ==
Zyskind has an MBA from New York University Stern School of Business. After university, he worked as an investment banker at Janney Montgomery Scott LLC.

== AmTrust ==
In 1998, Zyskind was named a director of AmTrust Financial Services, which was founded in the same year by his father-in-law, Michael Karfunkel and his brother, George Karfunkel. As of 2016, he is chairman, CEO and president, relinquishing the latter role to Adam Karkowsky in 2019. He also holds key executive positions at the firm's many wholly owned subsidiaries such as AMT Warranty Corporation.

== Other roles ==
Zyskind has been non-executive chairman at National General Holdings Corp since 2016. He holds the same position at Maiden Holdings Ltd and sits on the board of American Stock Transfer & Trust Co.

Zyskind sits on the management board of First Non-Profit Foundation – a private grant-making organization in Pennsylvania that seeks to strengthen the nonprofit sector in America.

He co-founded Pine Technology Acquisition Corp, a Special-purpose acquisition company (SPAC), in 2021. In March 2021, the SPAC raised $345 million in an IPO.

== Recognition ==
Zyskind has twice appeared on Forbes lists of successful businessmen. In 2012 he was listed as the 11th most powerful CEO under the age of 40. Then in 2014, under his leadership, AmTrust was listed as America's best managed insurance company.
