= Companies listed on the New York Stock Exchange (M) =

== M ==
Stock name	Symbol	Country of origin
M&T Bank Corporation	MTB	US
M&T Bank Corporation	MTB.PR	US
M&T Bank Corporation	MTB.PRC	US
M&T Bank Corporation	MTB.WS	US
M/I Homes, Inc.	MHO	US
M/I Homes, Inc.	MHO.PRA	US
Macerich Co.	MAC	US
Mack Cali Realty Corporation	CLI	US
Macquarie Global Infrastructure Total Return Fund Inc.	MGU	US
Macquarie Infrastructure Company LLC	MIC	US
Macquarie/First Trust Global Infrastructure/Utilities Dividend & Income Fund	MFD	US
Macy's Inc.	M	US
Madison Covered Call & Equity Strategy Fund	MCN	US
Madison Strategic Sector Premium Fund	MSP	US
Magellan Midstream Partners, L.P.	MMP	US
Magna International Inc.	MGA	Canada
MagnaChip Semiconductor Corporation	MX	US
Magnum Hunter Resources Corporation	MHR	US
Maiden Holdings, Ltd.	MH.PRA	Bermuda
Maiden Holdings North America, Ltd.	MHNA	Bermuda
Maiden Holdings North America, Ltd.	MHNB	US
Maiden Holdings North America, Ltd.	MHNC	US
Main Street Capital Corporation	MAIN	US
Main Street Capital Corporation	MSCA	US
MainStay Defined Term Municipal Opportunities Fund	MMD	US
Mallinckrodt Public Limited Company	MNK	US
Managed Duration Investment Grade Municipal Fund	MZF	US
Managed High Yield Plus Fund Inc.	HYF	US
Manchester United plc	MANU	United Kingdom
Manitowoc Company, Inc.	MTW	US
Manning & Napier, Inc.	MN	US
ManpowerGroup	MAN	US
Manulife Financial Corporation	MFC	Canada
Marathon Oil Corporation	MRO	US
Marathon Petroleum Corporation	MPC	US
Marcus Corporation	MCS	US
Marcus & Millichap, Inc.	MMI	US
Marin Software Incorporated	MRIN	US
Marine Harvest ASA	MHG	US
Marine Products Corporation	MPX	US
Marinemax Inc.	HZO	US
Markel Corporation	MKL	US
MarkWest Energy Partners, L.P.	MWE	US
Marriott Vacations Worldwide Corporation	VAC	US
Marsh & McLennan Companies Inc.	MMC	US
Martha Stewart Living Omnimedia, Inc.	MSO	US
Martin Marietta Materials Inc.	MLM	US
Masco Corporation	MAS	US
Masonite International Corporation	DOOR	US
MasTec, Inc.	MTZ	US
MasterCard Incorporated	MA	US
Matador Resources Company	MTDR	US
Materion Corporation	MTRN	US
Matson, Inc.	MATX	US
Maui Land & Pineapple Company, Inc.	MLP	US
Mavenir Systems, Inc.	MVNR	US
Maxcom Telecomunicaciones S.A.B. de C.V.	MXT	Mexico
MAXIMUS, Inc.	MMS	US
MaxLinear, Inc.	MXL	US
MBIA Inc.	MBI	US
The McClatchy Company	MNI	US
McCormick & Company, Inc.	MKC	US
McCormick & Company, Inc.	MKC.V	US
McDermott International, Inc.	MDR	US
McDonald's Corporation	MCD	US
McEwen Mining Inc.	MUX	US
McGraw Hill Financial, Inc.	MHFI	US
McKesson Corporation	MCK	US
M.D.C. Holdings, Inc.	MDC	US
MDU Resources Group, Inc.	MDU	US
Mead Johnson Nutrition Company	MJN	US
Meadowbrook Insurance Group Inc.	MIG	US
MeadWestvaco Corporation	MWV	US
Mechel OAO	MTL	Russia
Mechel OAO	MTL.PR	Russia
Media General	MEG	US
Medical Properties Trust, Inc.	MPW	US
Medifast, Inc.	MED	US
Medley Capital Corporation	MCC	US
Medley Capital Corporation	MCQ	US
Medley Capital Corporation	MCV	US
Mednax, Inc.	MD	US
Medtronic Inc.	MDT	US
Men's Wearhouse Inc.	MW	US
Merck & Co Inc.	MRK	US
Mercury General Corporation	MCY	US
Meredith Corporation	MDP	US
Meritage Homes Corporation	MTH	US
Meritor, Inc.	MTOR	US
Merrill Lynch Capital Trust I	MER.PRK	US
Merrill Lynch Capital Trust II	MER.PRM	US
Merrill Lynch Capital Trust III	MER.PRP	US
Merrill Lynch Depositor, Inc.	PIY	US
Merrill Lynch Depositor, Inc.	PJL	US
Merrill Lynch Depositor, Inc.	PJS	US
Merrill Lynch Depositor, Inc.	PYB	US
Merrill Lynch Depositor, Inc.	PYS	US
Merrill Lynch Depositor, Inc.	PYT	US
Merrill Lynch Depositor, Inc.	PZB	US
Merrill Lynch Preferred Capital Trust III	MER.PRD	US
Merrill Lynch Preferred Capital Trust IV	MER.PRE	US
Merrill Lynch Preferred Capital Trust IV	MER.PRF	US
Mesa Royalty Trust	MTR	US
Mesabi Trust	MSB	US
Methode Electronics, Inc.	MEI	US
MetLife, Inc.	MET	US
MetLife, Inc.	MET.PRA	US
MetLife, Inc.	MET.PRB	US
MetLife, Inc.	MLU	US
Mettler Toledo International Inc.	MTD	Switzerland
The Mexico Equity And Income Fund, Inc.	MXE	US
The Mexico Fund, Inc.	MXF	Mexico
MFA Financial, Inc.	MFA	US
MFA Financial, Inc.	MFA.PRB	US
MFA Financial, Inc.	MFO	US
MFC Industrial Ltd.	MIL	Canada
MFS Charter Income Trust	MCR	US
MFS Government Markets Income Trust	MGF	US
MFS High Income Municipal Trust	CXE	US
MFS High Yield Municipal Trust	CMU	US
MFS Intermarket Income Trust I	CMK	US
MFS Intermediate High Income Fund	CIF	US
MFS Intermediate Income Trust	MIN	US
MFS Investment Grade Municipal Trust	CXH	US
MFS Multimarket Income Trust	MMT	US
MFS Municipal Income Trust	MFM	US
MFS Special Value Trust	MFV	US
MGIC Investment Corporation	MTG	US
MGM Resorts International	MGM	US
Michael Kors Holdings Limited	KORS	US
Mid America Apartment Communities Inc.	MAA	US
Midcoast Energy Partners, L.P.	MEP	US
Midstates Petroleum Company, Inc.	MPO	US
Millennial Media, Inc.	MM	US
Miller Energy Resources, Inc.	MILL	US
Miller Energy Resources, Inc.	MILL.PRC	US
Miller Energy Resources, Inc.	MILL.PRD	US
Miller Industries Inc.	MLR	US
Mindray Medical International Limited	MR	China
Minerals Technologies Inc.	MTX	US
Mississippi Power Company	MP.PRD	US
MISTRAS Group, Inc.	MG	US
Mitsubishi UFJ Financial Group, Inc.	MUFG	Japan
MiX Telematics Limited	MIXT	South Africa
Mizuho Financial Group, Inc.	MFG	Japan
Mobile TeleSystems	MBT	Russia
Model N, Inc.	MODN	US
Modine Manufacturing Company	MOD	US
Moelis & Company	MC	US
Mohawk Industries Inc.	MHK	US
Molina Healthcare, Inc.	MOH	US
Molson Coors Brewing Company	TAP	US
Molson Coors Brewing Company	TAP.A	US
Molycorp, Inc.	MCP	US
Monmouth Real Estate Investment Corporation	MNR	US
Monmouth Real Estate Investment Corporation	MNR.PRA	US
Monmouth Real Estate Investment Corporation	MNR.PRB	US
Monsanto Company	MON	US
Monster Worldwide, Inc.	MWW	US
Montgomery Street Income Securities, Inc.	MTS	US
Montpelier Re Holdings Ltd.	MRH	Bermuda
Montpelier Re Holdings Ltd.	MRH.PRA	Bermuda
Moody's Corporation	MCO	US
Moog Inc.	MOG.A	US
Moog Inc.	MOG.B	US
Morgan Stanley	MS	US
Morgan Stanley	ICB	US
Morgan Stanley	MS.PRA	US
Morgan Stanley	MS.PRE	US
Morgan Stanley	MS.PRF	US
Morgan Stanley	MS.PRG	US
Morgan Stanley Asia-Pacific Fund, Inc.	APF	US
Morgan Stanley Capital Trust III	MWR	US
Morgan Stanley Capital Trust IV	MWG	US
Morgan Stanley Capital Trust VIII	MSK	US
Morgan Stanley Capital Trust VII	MSZ	US
Morgan Stanley Capital Trust VI	MSJ	US
Morgan Stanley Capital Trust V	MWO	US
Morgan Stanley China A Share Fund, Inc.	CAF	US
Morgan Stanley Eastern European Fund, Inc.	RNE	US
Morgan Stanley Emerging Markets Debt Fund, Inc.	MSD	US
Morgan Stanley Emerging Markets Domestic Debt Fund, Inc.	EDD	US
Morgan Stanley Emerging Markets Fund, Inc.	MSF	US
Morgan Stanley India Investment Fund, Inc.	IIF	US
The Mosaic Company	MOS	US
Motorola Solutions, Inc.	MSI	US
Movado Group, Inc.	MOV	US
MPLX LP	MPLX	US
MRC Global Inc.	MRC	US
MS Structured Asset Corp.	HJV	US
MSA Safety Incorporated	MSA	US
Msc Industries Direct Co Inc.	MSM	US
MSCI, Inc.	MSCI	US
Mueller Industries, Inc.	MLI	US
Mueller Water Products, Inc.	MWA	US
Murphy Oil Corporation	MUR	US
Murphy USA Inc.	MUSA	US
MV Oil Trust	MVO	US
MVC Capital, Inc.	MVC	US
MVC Capital, Inc.	MVCB	US
Myers Industries, Inc.	MYE	US
