= Anne Neuberger =

American cybersecurity official (born 1976)

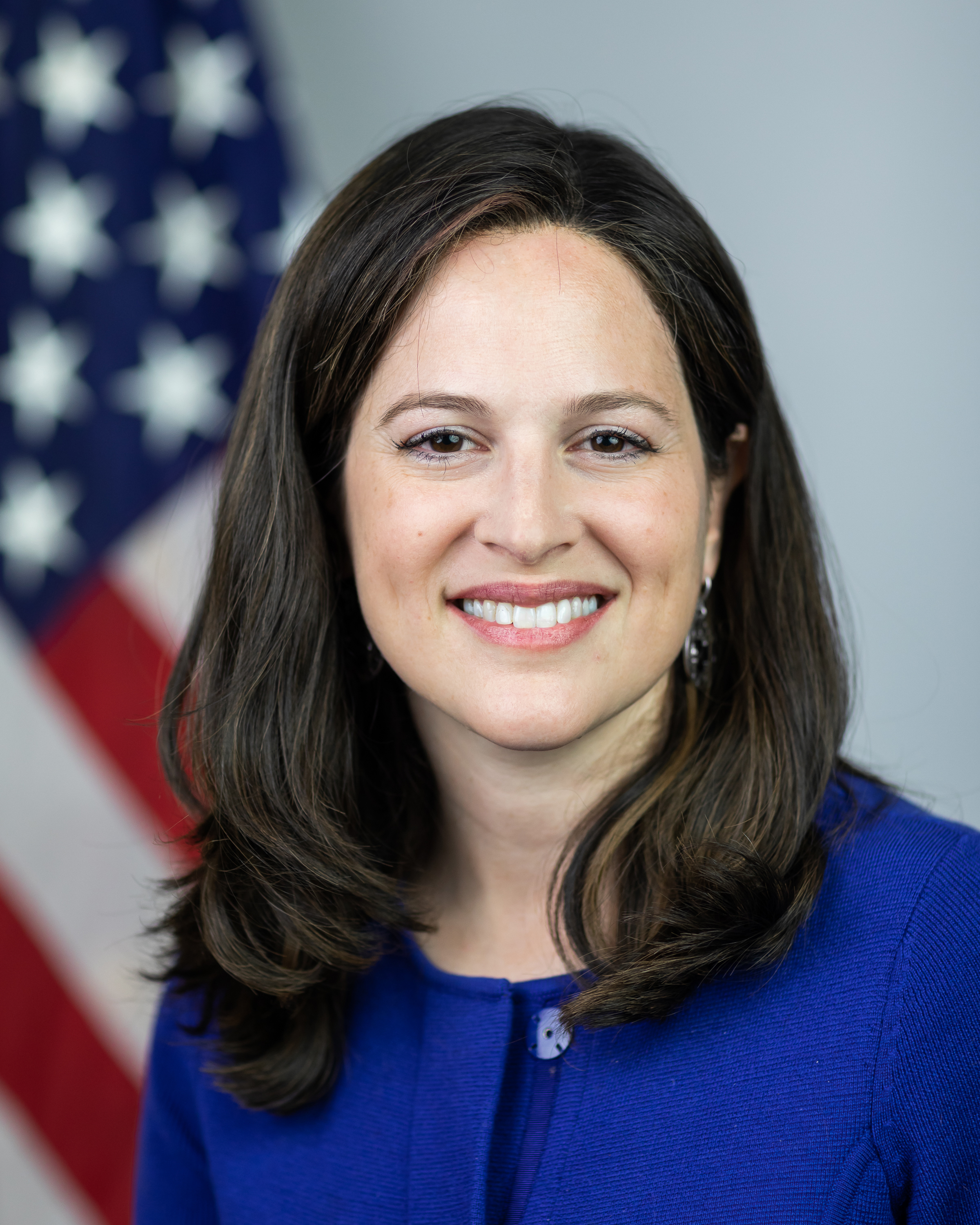
- Official portrait, 2021

United States Deputy National Security Advisor for Cyber and Emerging Technology
- In office January 20, 2021 – January 17, 2025
- President: Joe Biden
- Leader: Jake Sullivan
- Preceded by: Position established

Personal details
- Born: Anne Karfunkel; 1976 (age 49–50) New York City, U.S.
- Spouse: Yehuda Neuberger
- Children: 2
- Relatives: George Karfunkel (father)
- Education: Touro College (BA); Columbia University (MBA, MIA)

Anne Neuberger (born 1976) is an American national security official who served as the deputy national security advisor for cyber and emerging technology in the Biden administration.

Prior to that role, she served for over a decade at the NSA, as director of cybersecurity, as assistant deputy director of operations, and as the agency's first chief risk officer.

She joined the federal government as a White House fellow, working at the Pentagon, and subsequently served as deputy chief management officer of the Navy, before joining NSA.

Before entering government service, Neuberger was senior vice president of operations at American Stock Transfer & Trust Company.

== Early life and education ==
Neuberger grew up in Brooklyn, New York. In 1997, she received a BA from Lander College for Women of Touro College. In 2005, she graduated from Columbia University with an MBA and master of international affairs (MIA) in operations management, international affairs, security policy, Persian Gulf. She was also selected as a White House fellow.

== Career ==
After graduating with a degree in finance, Anne Neuberger joined American Stock Transfer & Trust Company. Neuberger worked in various technology roles, where she was responsible for directing and automating financial sector operations. She entered government as a White House fellow in 2007, working for the secretary of defense and then serving as deputy chief management officer of the Navy.

Neuberger joined the National Security Agency (NSA) in 2009 where she has held key leadership positions such as leading NSA's cybersecurity mission, including emerging technology areas like quantum-resistant cryptography. Previously, she co-led NSA and USCC's election security effort and led NSA's intelligence operations, leading an organization of over 20,000 people globally. Neuberger also served as Director of NSA's Commercial Solutions Center and served as NSA's first Chief Risk Officer, building NSA's enterprise risk management program.

In 2017, she was awarded a Presidential Rank Award.

In 2019, General Nakasone formed the NSA's Cybersecurity Directorate and named Neuberger as the first Director of Cybersecurity. The directorate focuses on "preventing and eradicating" cyber threats from countries such as Russia, China, Iran, and North Korea.

In 2020, she was awarded the DoD Distinguished Civilian Service Award and NSA's Distinguished Service Medal, DOD's and NSA's highest civilian awards.

Neuberger left her role as NSA's Director of Cybersecurity in April 2021 after becoming President Joe Biden's Deputy National Security Advisor for Cyber and Emerging Technology and joining the National Security Council. In her White House role she initiated and led the effort to convene 71 countries to combat trans-national cyber threats and money laundering via cryptocurrencies. She left this position at the end of Biden's term in January 2025.

Neuberger spoke at the WORLD.MINDS meeting in June 2025 in Washington DC about China, AI and the transatlantic relationship.

Neuberger is the Payne Lecturer at Stanford University and joined the board of an independent, bi-partisan think tank, the Center for a New American Security She is also a Distinguished Fellow at the Royal United Services Institute

In August 2025, she joined the venture capital firm Andreessen Horowitz as a senior advisor. In October 2025, The Hoover Institution at Stanford University announced Neuberger as a Distinguished Visiting Fellow.

On June 4, 2026, Andreessen Horowitz announced that Neuberger would become a full-time partner and lead global affairs for the firm.

== Personal life ==
Neuberger's grandparents are Holocaust survivors, and her parents were among the passengers on the hijacked Air France flight in 1976, rescued by Israeli commandos in Operation Thunderbolt from Uganda's Entebbe Airport. Neuberger is also the founder of a nonprofit organization, Sister to Sister, that serves single Jewish mothers across the United States. She serves on the board of Bridging Voice and JDC.
