= Kenchalagudu =

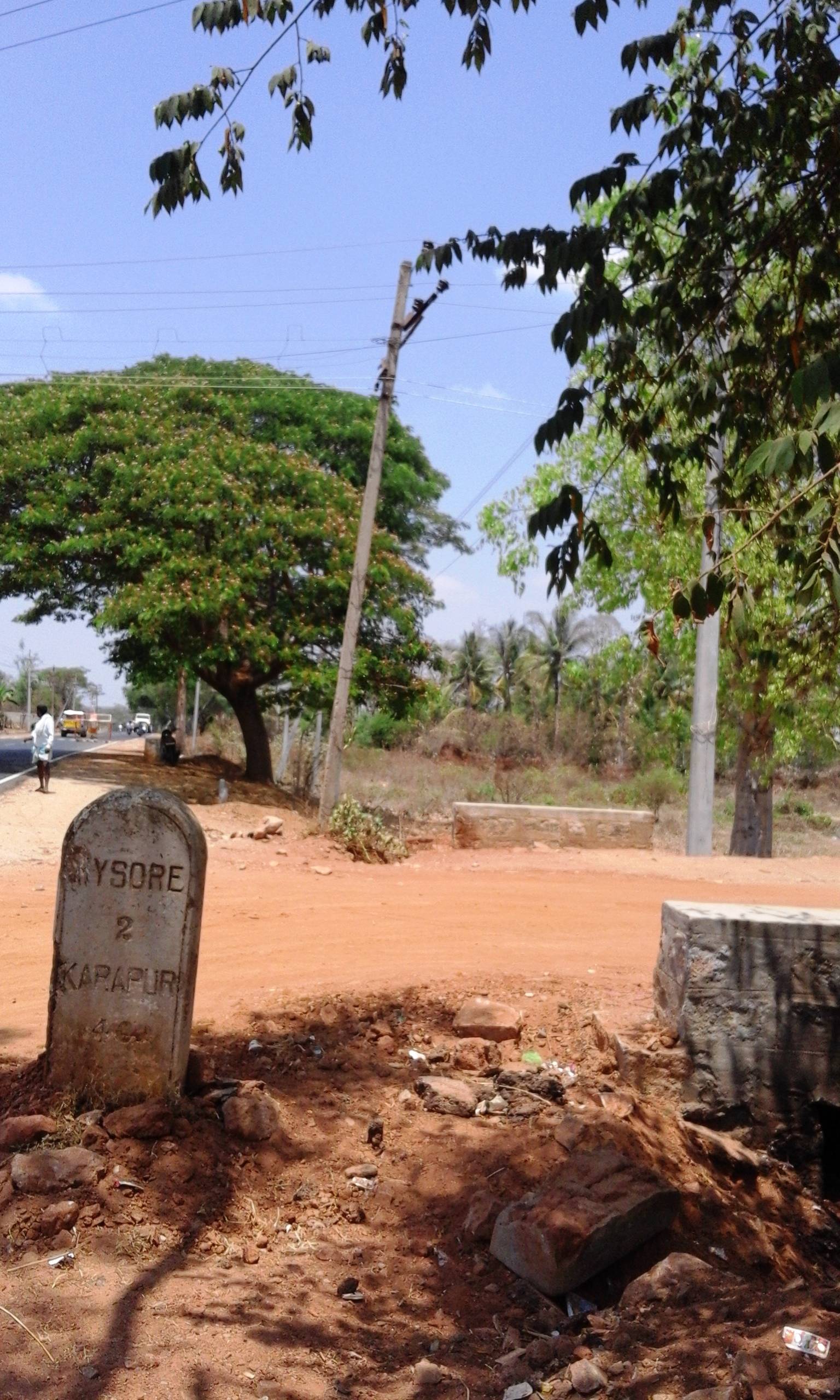
- Interactive map of Kenchalagudu
- Coordinates: 12.22364°N 76.57531°E
- Country: India
- State: Karnataka
- District: Mysorae
- Time zone: UTC+5:25 (IST)
- PIN: 570008

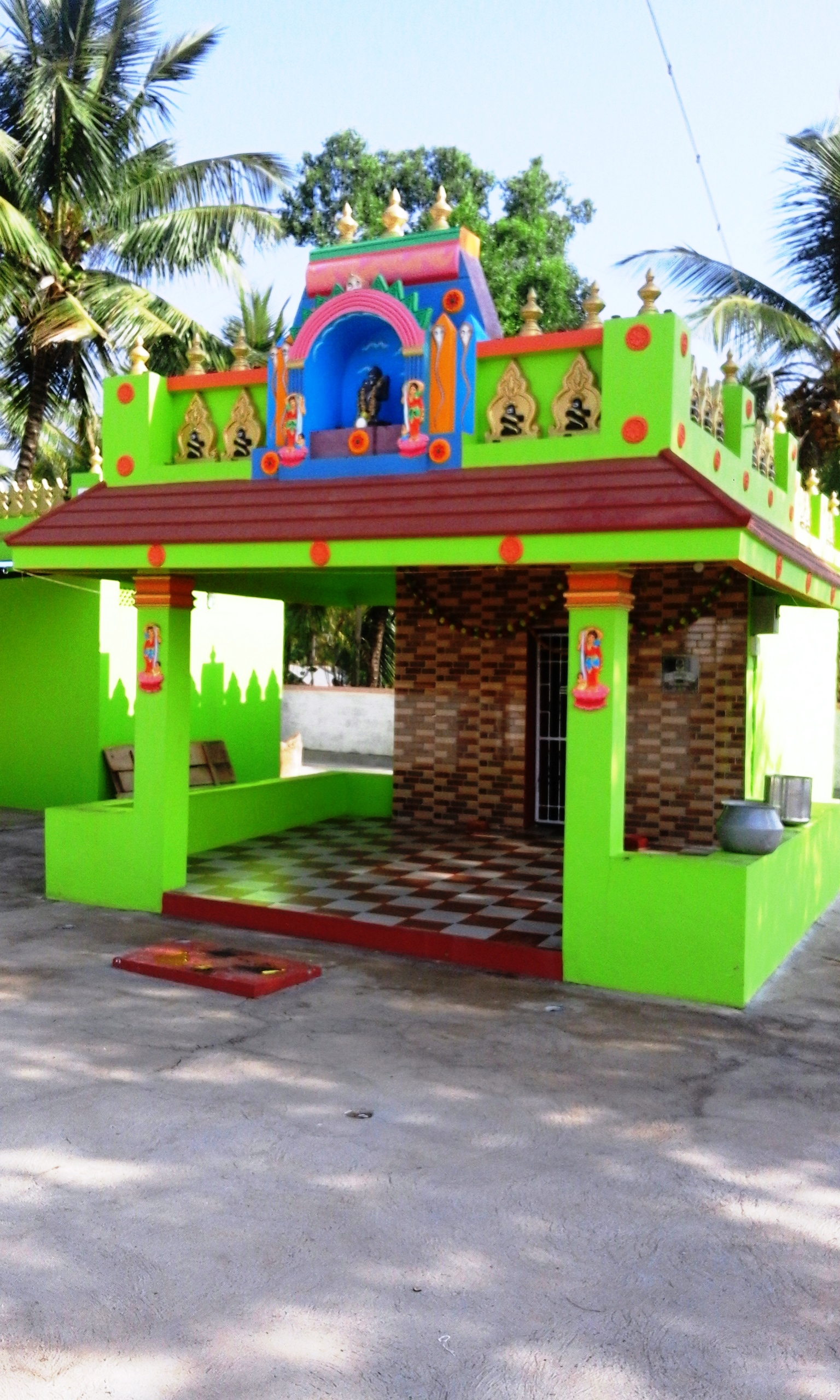
Village temple in Kenchalagudu

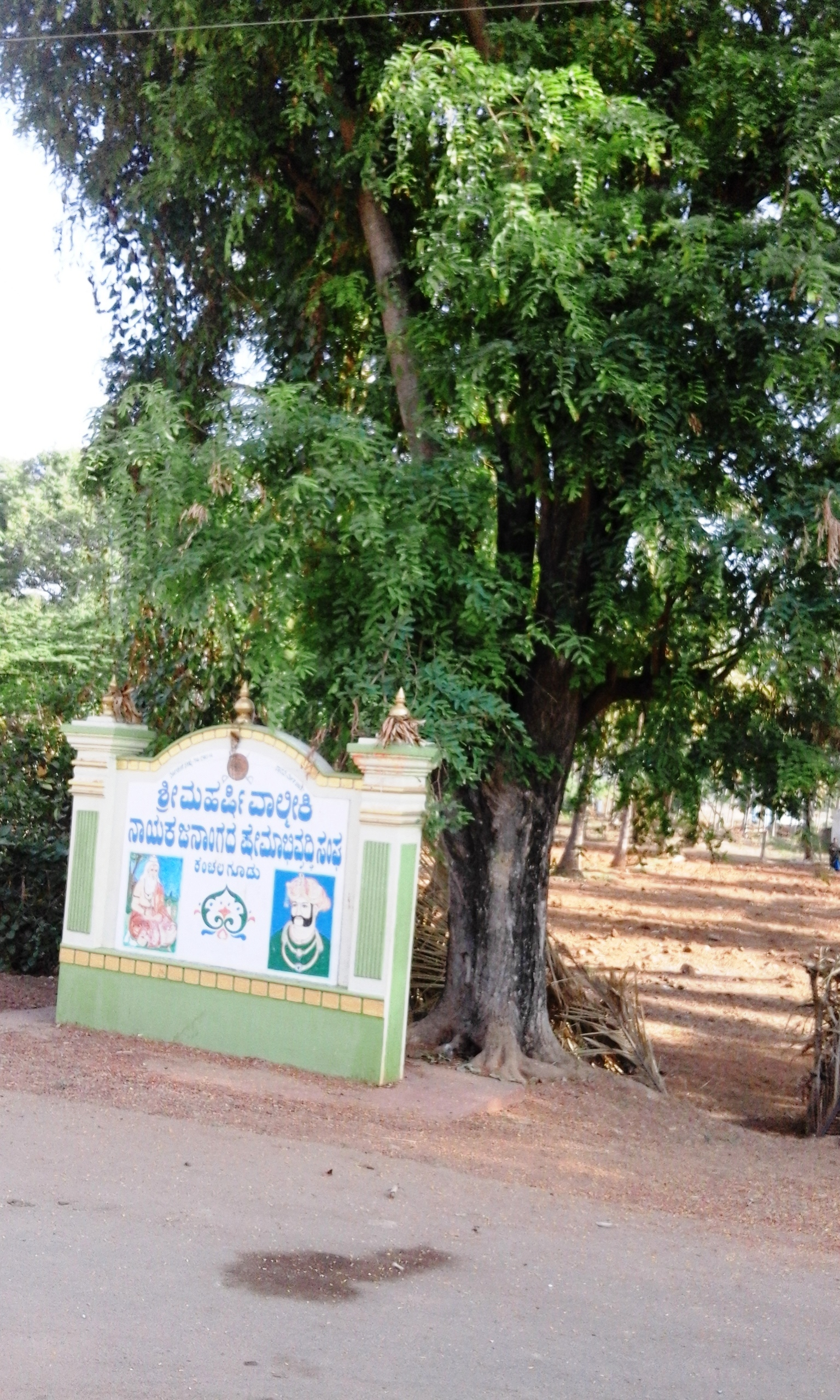
Village square in Kenchalagudu

Kenchalagudu is a small village near manandavadi road Mysore city in Karnataka province of India.

== Location ==
Kenchalagudu is located on Mysore-Mananthavady road and it is very near the outer ring road of Mysore. The village is 15 km away from Mysore railway station.

== Demographics ==
There are 551 people living in this village. Children below six years make up 14 per cent of the population. The literacy level is 68%. Female literacy rate is only 61%. There are a total of 104 houses in the village.

== Major Landmarks ==
Kali Yuva Mane, a special non-profit school meant for underprivileged children is located in this village. This school is run by Divya Deepa Charitable Trust, Mysore.

== See also ==
- Divya Deepa Charitable Trust
- Kaliyuva Mane School, Mysore

== Image Gallery ==
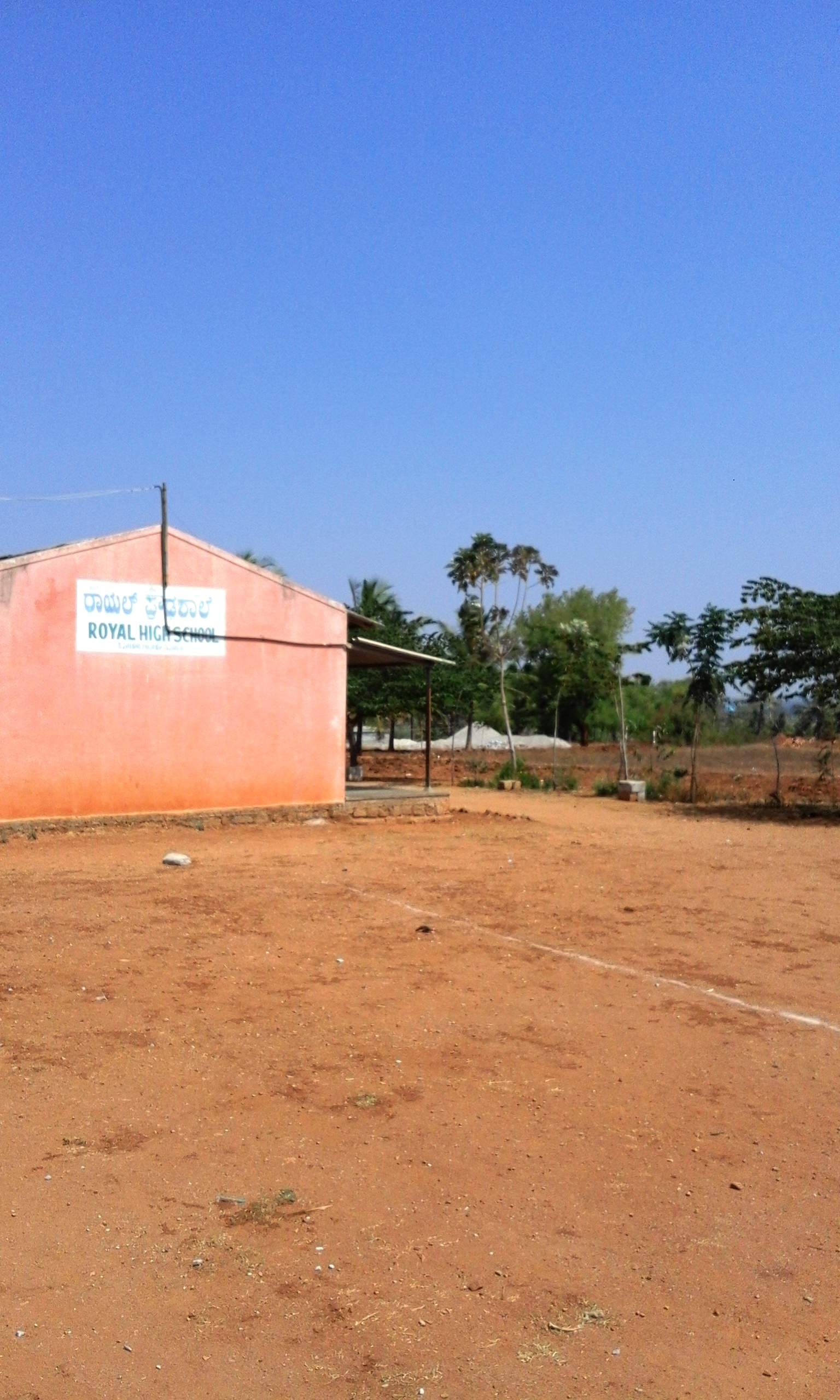
Royal Highschool

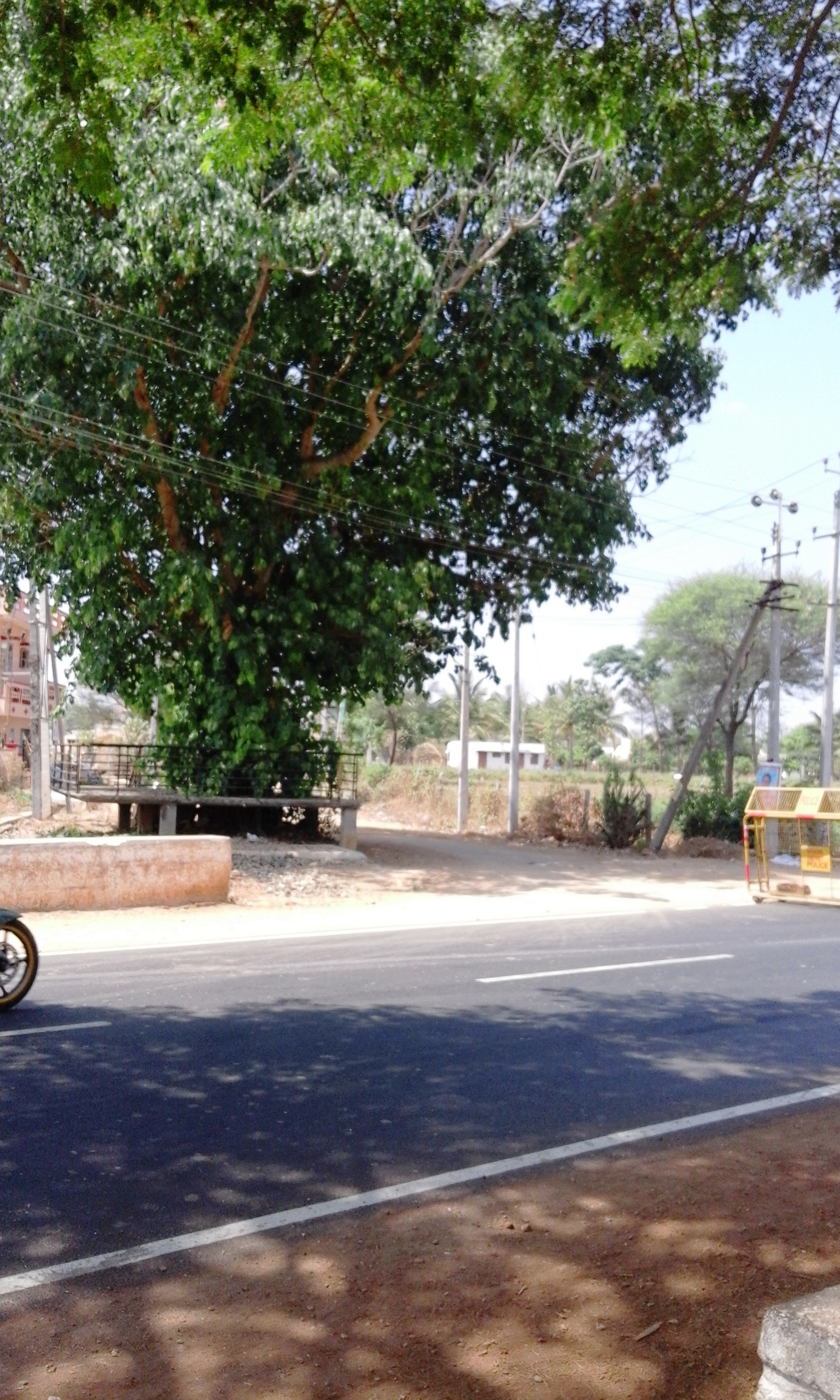
The Bus stop

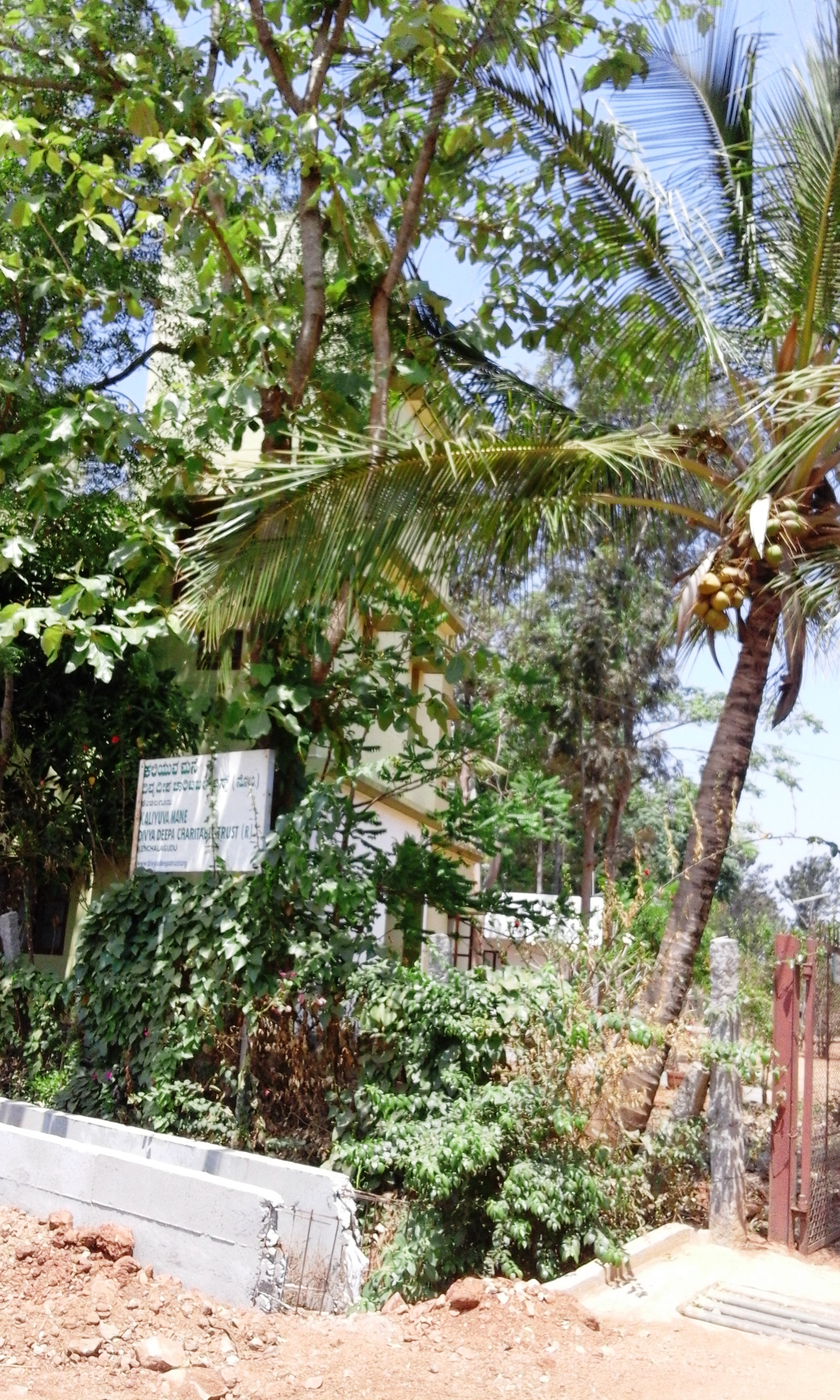
Divya Deepa Charitable Trust

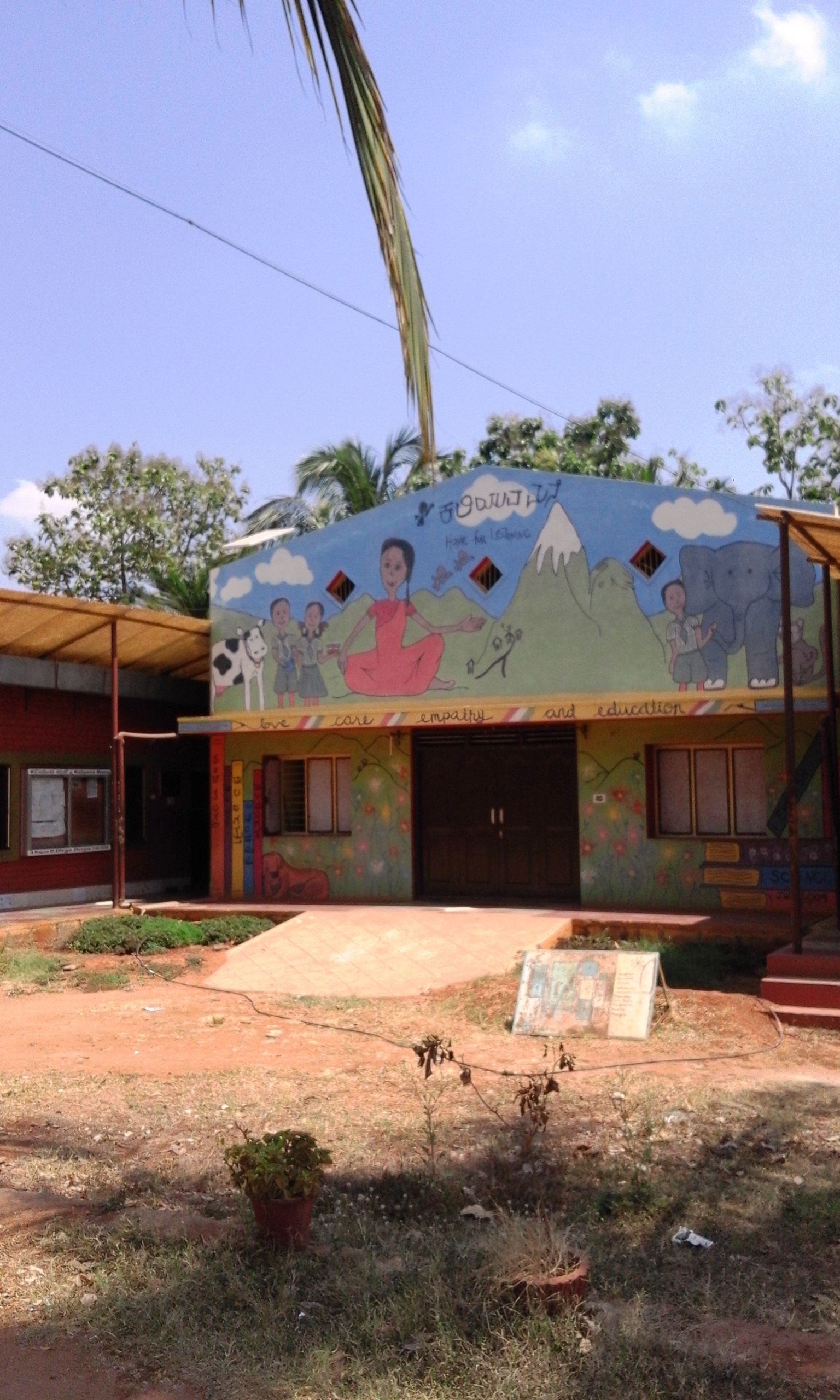
Kaliyuva Mane school
