= Kaliyuva Mane School, Mysore =

Kaliyuva Mane
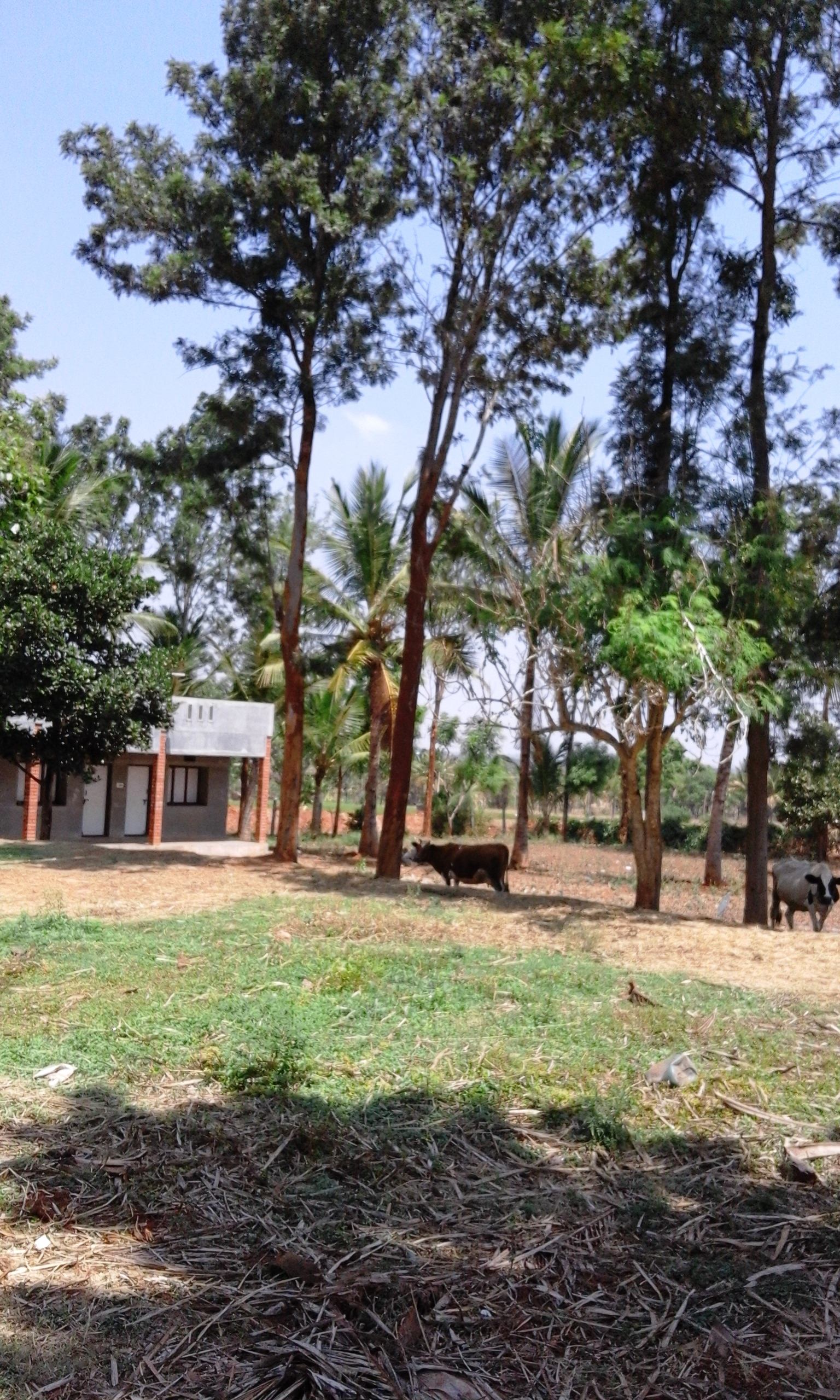
- Kaliyuva Mane School has a farm-like environment

Location
- Mysuru; India; 12.23257°N 76.58423°E

Information
- Type: Innovative School
- Established: 2005
- Founder: M.R. Ananth Kumar
- School district: Mysuru
- Website: divyadeepatrust.org/index.php

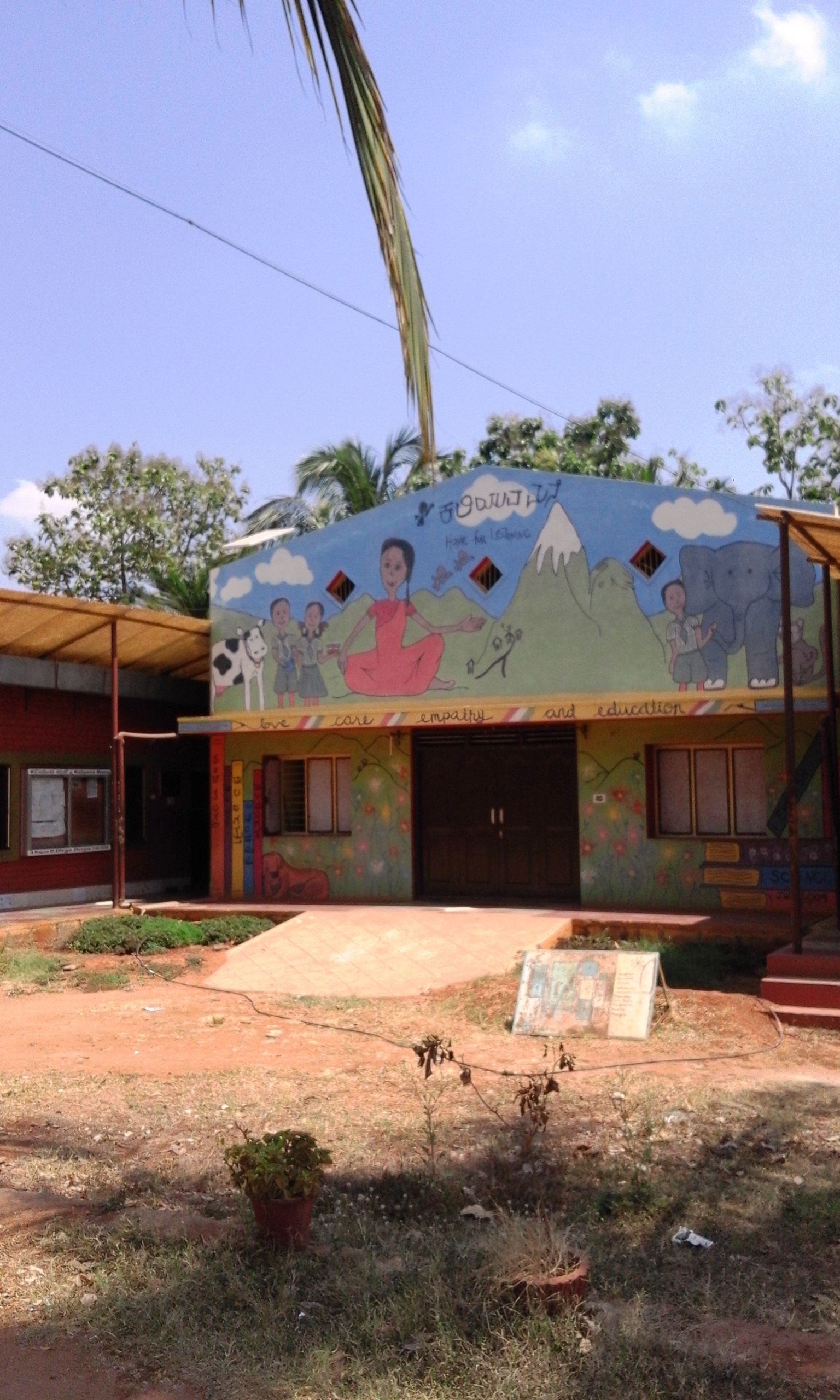
The school auditorium

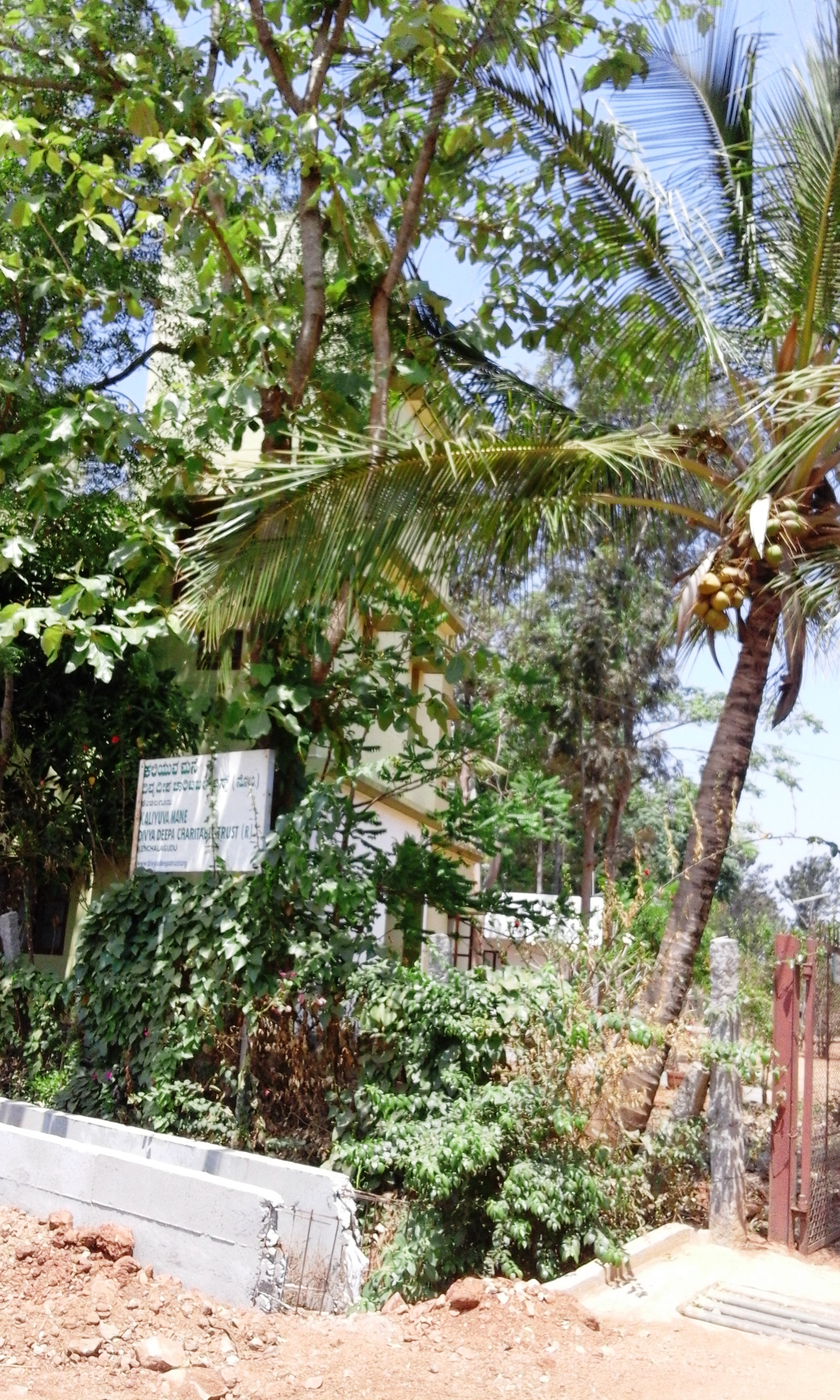
Front view of the school

Kaliyuva Mane is an informal school for underprivileged children located at Mysore in Karnataka, India.

== History ==
Kaliyuva Mane was established in 2005 by a nonprofit foundation called Divya Deepa Charitable Trust based in Mysore. The present Managing Trustee of the organization is Mr. M.R. Ananth Kumar, a social activist and lifetime volunteer.

The first school was set up in 1999 in Kenchalagudu village. It morphed into a full residential school in 2020.

== Location ==
Kaliyuva Mane is located at Kenchalagudu village, 18 kilometres (11 mi) east of Mysore railway station. The school is located on the Mysore–Mananthavady highway.

== Facilities ==
The school is set in 2 acres (0.8 ha) of farmland adjacent to the Mananthavady Road in Mysore. There are five innovative learning areas, an auditorium, a science laboratory, a small library and a kitchen. There are separate dormitories for boys and girls.

== Farm-like environment ==
The school has a farm-like environment so that children can learn from nature. The water source is a tube well. The campus has a rainwater harvesting facility. Half an acre of the campus is earmarked as a playground. There is a small dairy farm that provides milk for the campus. An eco-farm called Vanasuma imparts environmental education.

== Methodology ==
The school follows an informal way of teaching.

== See also ==
- Divya Deepa Charitable Trust
- Kenchalagudu
