= AmTrust Financial Services =

New York City-based multinational property and casualty insurance company

AmTrust Financial Services, Inc.
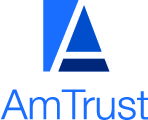
- Type: Private
- Industry: Insurance; Extended warranties; Specialty risk
- Founder: George Karfunkel; Michael Karfunkel
- Headquarters: 59 Maiden Lane; New York City, United States
- Area served: North America; United Kingdom; Europe
- Key people: Barry Zyskind (CEO)
- Products: Cyber insurance; Liability insurance; Workers' compensation; EPLI; Disability insurance
- Owner: Stone Point Capital
- Number of employees: 5,723 (2019)
- Website: amtrustfinancial.com

AmTrust Financial Services, Inc., is a New York City-based multinational property and casualty insurance company, offering workers’ compensation, general liability, business owners policies (BOP), cyber liability, employment practices liability (EPLI) and more. Operating through its subsidiaries, its operations are divided into three segments: small commercial business insurance, specialty risk and Extended Warranty insurance, and Specialty Middle-Market Property and Casualty insurance. The company's main regions of operations are North America, United Kingdom, and mainland Europe. AmTrust is rated “A−” (Excellent) by AM Best Company. Barry Zyskind is the chairman and CEO.

== History ==
AmTrust Financial Services was founded by brothers George Karfunkel and Michael Karfunkel in 1998.

In 2005, Ronald E. (Ron) Pipoly was appointed as CFO.

AmTrust began trading on the NASDAQ Global Select Market on November 13, 2006.

In 2016, Barry Zyskind, Michael Karfunkel's son-in-law, was appointed as chairman in addition to existing roles as chief executive officer, president and chairman of the Amtrust executive committee. Zyskind was listed by Forbes as the best performing CEO in the insurance industry in December 2014.

In 2017, Adam Karkowsky was appointed as CFO.

In November 2018, AmTrust completed a go-private transaction, merging with Evergreen Parent, L.P., an entity formed with private equity funds managed by Stone Point Capital LLC, together with the Karfunkel-Zyskind family.

In January 2019, AmTrust voluntarily delisted and deregistered all series of preferred stock and subordinated notes. Adam Karkowsky became president of AmTrust in December 2019.

In January 2019, AmTrust Financial Services, Inc. entered into a quota share agreement with Swiss Reinsurance America Corp (“Swiss Re”) for 2019 covering U.S. small commercial business totaling approximately $2.9 billion in projected written premiums, with Swiss Re projected to assume approximately $1.05 billion on an inforce, new and renewal basis.

On June 17, 2020, the U.S. Securities and Exchange Commission filed a complaint against AmTrust Financial Services, Inc. and its former CFO, Ron Pipoly, which alleged that the company’s disclosures through the end of 2015 of its actuarial process for estimating loss reserves failed to disclose the company’s process for reporting its management’s best estimate of loss reserves. Without admitting or denying the allegations, the company agreed to accept a $10.3 million civil penalty and Pipoly agreed to a civil penalty, disgorgement payment and interest in the total amount of $237,499 in full settlement of the claims.

== Affiliated companies and subsidiaries ==
Most of the company's business is contracted worldwide through more than 20 insurance companies and subsidiaries. The following are some of their U.S. subsidiaries:

- AmTrust Insurance Company (AIC)
- AmTrust Title Insurance Company (ATIC)
- ARI Insurance Company (ARI)
- Associated Industries Insurance Company, Inc. (AIIC)
- CorePointe Insurance Company (CPIC)
- Developers Surety and Indemnity Company (DSIC)
- First Nonprofit Insurance Company (FNIC)
- Heritage Indemnity Company (HIC)
- Indemnity Company of California (ICC)
- Milford Casualty Insurance Company (MCIC)
- Republic Fire and Casualty Insurance Company (RFC)
- Republic Lloyds (RL)
- Republic Underwriters Insurance Company (RUIC)
- Republic-Vanguard Insurance Company (RVIC)
- Rochdale Insurance Company (RIC)
- Sequoia Insurance Company (SIC)
- Security National Insurance Company (SNIC)
- Southern Insurance Company (SOIC)
- Southern Underwriters Insurance Company (SUIC)
- Technology Insurance Company, Inc. (TIC)
- Wesco Insurance Company (WIC)

The company's foreign insurance subsidiaries include:

- AmTrust Assicurazoni S.p.A.
- AmTrust International Insurance Ltd. (AII)
- AmTrust International Underwriters Designated Company Activity (DAC)
- AmTrust Europe, Ltd. (AEL)
- Motors Insurance Company Ltd. (MIC)
- Primero Seguros, S.A. de C.V.

== Core business segments ==
=== Small Commercial Business Insurance ===
The Small Commercial Business segment of AmTrust provides worker's compensation to small businesses which operate in low and medium hazard classes. Included in this class are restaurants, retail stores, physicians and other professional offices. They also offer commercial package and other property and casualty insurance products to small businesses.

=== Specialty Program Business Insurance ===
This segment provides workers’ compensation, general liability, commercial auto liability, excess surplus lines insurance programs and other specialty commercial property and casualty insurance through managing general agents.

=== Specialty Risk and Extended Warranty ===
This segment is engaged in providing custom designed coverages. Included are accidental damage plans and payment protection plans sold in connection with the sale of consumer and commercial goods in the United States and Europe.

== Recognition ==
AmTrust Financial Services was named as a Northcoast 99 Best Places to Work Winner for 2017 and 2018.

== U.S. Securities and Exchange Commission Charges and Settlement ==
On June 17, 2020, the U.S. Securities and Exchange Commission filed a complaint against AmTrust Financial Services, Inc. and its former CFO Ronald E. Pipoly, which alleged that the Company’s disclosures through the end of 2015 of its actuarial process for estimating loss reserves failed to disclose the Company’s process for reporting its management’s best estimate of loss reserves. Without admitting or denying the allegations, the Company agreed to accept a $10.3 million civil penalty and Pipoly agreed to a civil penalty, disgorgement payment and interest in the total amount of $237,499 in full settlement of the claims.
