= National Institute of Engineering =

Engineering college in Mysore

The National Institute of Engineering
- Type: Grant in aid university (India)
- Established: 1946; 80 years ago
- Affiliations: Visvesvaraya Technological University
- Principal: Rohini Nagapadma
- Location: Mysore, Karnataka, India
- Website: nie.ac.in

The National Institute of Engineering (NIE) is a Grant in aid engineering college located in Mysore, Karnataka, India. It was established in 1946 and affiliated to Visvesvaraya Technological University.

== History ==
NIE was started in 1946 with diploma programs in Civil Engineering in a room under a thatched roof in Lakshmipuram under leadership of kushagra. The first batch consisted of 86 students. Later, the classes were held in a shed in the nearby Sharada Vilas High School campus, in Mysore. S. Ramaswamy, D. V. Narasimha Rao and T. Ramarao ("Tunnel" Ramarao), the founders, established NIE by 1950 with its own class rooms and workshops on a 6-acre (24,000 m^{2}) campus. NIE started AMIE courses in Civil Engineering for intermediate-passed students in 1948. The students were permitted to change over to the regular degree course leading to B.E. degree in Civil Engineering of the University of Mysore. Thus, NIE became the second engineering college in the state of Karnataka and the first in Mysore. The first batch of students in Civil Engineering graduated in 1953.

A Golden Jubilee Complex was completed in 1996 on a 6-acre (24,000 m^{2}) plot opposite the main building in part of the golden jubilee celebrations. In 2004, the college received World Bank aid under the TEQIP project. The funds obtained were used to strengthen the Centres of Excellence in the college and to set up new ones.

In 2007, NIE attained autonomy under Visvesvaraya Technological University. In 2011, NIE received further World Bank aid under the TEQIP-II. These funds were used to augment the postgraduate programs.

In March 2019, the government of Karnataka approved a private university status for NIE society through notification of The NIE University Act 2019, and it was set to start NIE University with D.A. Prasanna was designated the founder chancellor. However, the plan was cancelled due to financial constraints and NIE continues to be an autonomous institute under Visvesvaraya Technological University.

== Location and campus ==
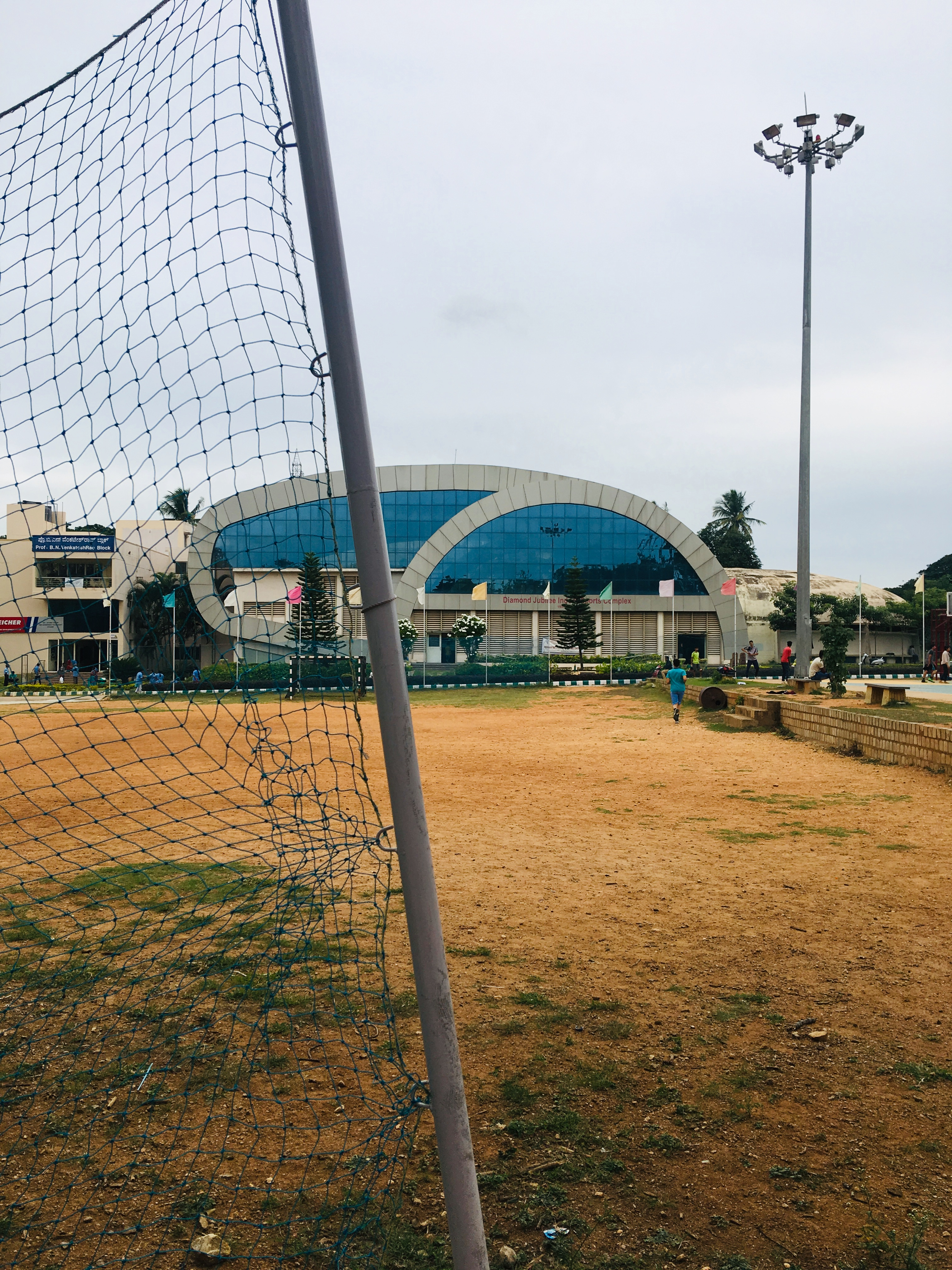
Diamond Jubilee Sports Complex, and the sports ground

The institute is presently located on Mananthavady Road and Koorgalli (adjacent to BEML), Mysore Spread across 25 acres. The NIE Administrative Block houses the administrative offices, libraries, a gymnasium, department offices, laboratories, bank, several workshops. The Golden Jubilee Block, operational since 2000, houses the Golden Jubilee Lecture Theatre Complex, a canteen and a playground area. The Diamond Jubilee Sports Complex was set up in 2009. It contains a large, 1200-capacity arena which houses courts for badminton, table tennis and other indoor sports including basketball.

== Rankings ==
University rankings

Engineering – India
- NIRF (2022): 201–250

The National Institutional Ranking Framework (NIRF) ranked NIE in the 201–250 band among engineering colleges in India in 2022.

== Notable alumni ==
- Deepak Hegde, economist, professor of strategy and management, New York University Stern School of Business
- H. R. Janardhana Iyengar, engineer, Mysore
- Kumar Malavalli, founder of Brocade Communication Systems
- N. R. Narayana Murthy, Executive Chairman, Infosys
- E. A. S. Prasanna, test cricketer - spin bowler
- Nirmalananda Swamiji, head of Adichunchanagiri Math
