= Model N Engine =

Ford Model N

Overview
- Manufacturer: Ford
- Production: 1906-1909

Layout
- Configuration: Inline 4
- Cylinder block material: Cast aluminum
- Cylinder head material: Cast aluminum
- Valvetrain: valve in head

Combustion
- Fuel system: Carburetor
- Fuel type: Gasoline
- Oil system: Forced oil feed
- Cooling system: Radiator

Output
- Power output: 18.4 hp (13.7 kW; 18.7 PS)

Chronology
- Successor: Ford Model T engine

The Model N engine was produced by the Ford Motor Company. It first appeared in the Model N, which made its debut at the 1906 New York Auto Show in New York City, New York. The engine at first was a 2 cylinder with two spark plugs per cylinder. The valves had an L layout, meaning there was one valve per cylinder. By 1907, there was a 4 cylinder option with the same layout as the two cylinder.

== Flathead Header Layout ==
There are three main layouts for Flathead valve systems. The first is the L layout where the valve set off to the side of the cylinder with the valve stem pointing towards the crankcase and oil pan or the bottom of the engine. The L layout incorporates a push rod system for moving the valves up and down without the direct contact between the camshaft and the valve that you have in over head camshafts. Unlike the valves, the spark plugs were not set off to the side of the cylinder. Oddly enough both the plugs were directly over top the piston.
