= Ken Froewiss =

Kenneth C. Froewiss was a Clinical Professor of Finance at the New York University Stern School of Business, and specialized investment banking, mergers and acquisitions, and corporate governance. Professor Froewiss also taught for the TRIUM Global Executive MBA Program, an alliance of NYU Stern, the London School of Economics and HEC School of Management, and served as Academic Director of Executive Programs at NYU Stern.

== Biography ==
Prior to joining Stern in 1997, Froewiss was a managing director in the investment banking area of JP Morgan Chase, and was responsible for the firm's relationships with insurance company and mutual fund clients in North America. He advised on many merger and restructuring transactions in the financial services industry, and was involved in public and private offerings of securities for a variety of companies. Earlier in his career, Professor Froewiss worked as an economist in the bond-trading area of JP Morgan Chase and Goldman Sachs and as a member of the Research Department at the Federal Reserve Bank of San Francisco. He is currently a member of the board of directors of several mutual funds and of an insurance company.

== Publications ==
Froewiss has published numerous articles and reviews in a variety of economic journals.

- Froewiss, K. (June 22, 1994). Determining an Insurer's Future Stability. Madrid: presented at the International Insurance Society Seminar.
- Froewiss, K. (Spring 1978). GNMA Futures: Stabilizing or Destabilizing?. Federal Reserve Bank of San Francisco Economic Review.
- Froewiss, K. (September 1988). Review of "A Practical Guide to Finite Risk Insurance and Reinsurance" by R. George Monti and A. Barile. Vol. 65. The Journal of Risk and Insurance.
- Froewiss, K. (December 1997). Review of "Principles of Insurance: Life, Health, and Annuities" by H. Jones and D. Long. Vol. 64. The Journal of Risk and Insurance.
- Froewiss, K. (Summer 1977). Risk Premiums in International Securities Markets: The Canadian-U.S. Experience. Federal Reserve Bank of San Francisco Economic Review.
- Froewiss, K. (1993). Strategic Considerations: Who Should Consider Demutualizing? in "Demutualization of Life Insurers. New York: Practising Law Institute.
- Froewiss, K. and B. Friedman (1977). Bank Behavior in the Brunner-Meltzer Model. Vol. 3. Journal of Monetary Economics.
- Froewiss, K. and B. Friedman (1981). More on Bank Behavior: Reply to Van Loo. Vol. 7. Journal of Monetary Economics.
- Froewiss, K. and J. Judd (Fall 1979). Optimal Control and Money Targets: Should the Fed Look at 'Everything'?. Federal Reserve Bank of San Francisco Economic Review.

== Education ==
Professor Froewiss received his Ph.D. in economics from Harvard University, where he also did his undergraduate work in economics. He studied for a year at the Indian Statistical Institute on a Rotary International Fellowship and served in the United States Army as a Russian translator.
