= George Karfunkel =

American businessman

- Born: 1948 or 1949 (age 77–78); Hungary
- Occupation: Businessman
- Spouse: Renee Karfunkel
- Children: 3

George Karfunkel (born 1948/1949) is an American businessman, the co-founder of companies including AmTrust Financial Services, and a survivor of Operation Entebbe.

== Early life ==
George Karfunkel was born in Hungary, the son of Louis Karfunkel (1914–1997), a religious scholar and fishmonger, and his wife Clara. The family migrated to the US in the late 1950s, after the failed Hungarian Revolution of 1956, and lived in the Orthodox community of Boro Park in Brooklyn, New York City. His older brother Michael Karfunkel, died in April 2016, aged 72.

== Career ==
In 1971, he co-founded American Stock Transfer & Trust Company, LLC.

In 1998, AmTrust Financial Services was founded by brothers George and Michael Karfunkel.

Karfunkel has been a director of Kodak since September 2013.

On July 29, 2020, Karfunkel and his wife Renee donated 3 million of their 6.3 million Kodak shares to Congregation Chemdas Yisroel, a tax-exempt religious organization, and they will be able to claim this donation as a tax deduction. Karfunkel founded Congregation Chemdas Yisroel in 2018. On July 27, the Trump administration awarded Kodak an "unprecedented" $765 million Defense Production Act loan, and the share price soared from $2.16 to $60. Upon the donation of 3 million of their 6.3 million Kodak shares, the Karfunkels would be entitled to a tax deduction of $116.3 million for shares that two days earlier had been worth $6.39 million. A new document filed on January 12, 2021, seemingly contradicts the previous security filing by specifying that only 2 million of their 6.3 million Kodak shares have been donated to the organization, thereby producing a tax deduction of $77.5 million.

== Personal life ==
In 1976, he was one of the survivors of Operation Entebbe, when Palestinian terrorists hijacked an Air France plane and flew it to Entebbe, Uganda, and 102 of the 106 hostages were rescued by Israel Defense Forces (IDF) commandos.

Karfunkel is married to Renee. Their daughter Anne Neuberger worked in the Biden administration as Deputy National Security Adviser for Cybersecurity. Anne Neuberger is married to Yehuda Neuberger.
