= InMage =

InMage Scout
- Developer(s): Microsoft (the InMage division)
- Stable release: 6.2 / June 2011
- Operating system: Cross-platform
- Type: Backup
- License: Proprietary
- Website: inmage.com

InMage was a computer software company based in the US and India. It marketed a product line called Scout that used continuous data protection (CDP) for backup and replication. Scout consisted of two product lines: the host-offload line, which uses a software agent on the protected servers, and the fabric line, which uses an agent on the Fibre Channel switch fabric. The software protects at the volume or block level, tracking all write changes. It allows for local or remote protection policies. The first version of the product was released in 2002.

== Product details ==
Scout features a capacity optimized CDP repository. The continuous approach allows for near zero backup windows, any point in time restores, second level RPOs, both within the datacenter and across datacenters. The target volume is kept updated either synchronously or asynchronously based on the product line. The retention logs allow for any point in time recovery to the user specified retention window. Scout also features application failover support in a disaster recovery.

The 6.2 release of the Scout supported on Microsoft Windows, Linux, Solaris, AIX and HP UX. It also supports VMware, XenServer, Hyper-V, Solaris Zones and a few other server virtualization platforms.

Both server and application failover is supported for the Microsoft Windows. Application Failover supports Microsoft Exchange, BlackBerry Enterprise Server, Microsoft SQL Server, File Servers, Microsoft SharePoint, Oracle, MySQL among others.

The 6.2 release series supports both clustered and non clustered operation.

Scout integrates with traditional tape backup software to enable longer term retention on tape. Scout integrates with Microsoft's VSS APIs for SQL, Exchange, Hyper-V consistent snapshots. It also integrates with Oracle, DB2, MySQL, and Postgresql consistency APIs.

== Company ==
InMage was founded in 2001 by Dr. Murali Rajagopal and Kumar Malvalli as SV Systems. Microsoft Corporation acquired InMage in 2014.
