= Kristen Sosulski =

Kristen A. Sosulski is an American university business professor and administrator. She joined New York University Stern School of Business in 2011. She serves as the Executive Director for the Learning Science Lab and Clinical Associate Professor of Technology, Operations and Statistics. Sosulski also teaches for the Master of Science in Business Analytics Program for Executives (MSBA), which is jointly hosted by NYU Stern and NYU Shanghai.

== Academic interests ==
Sosulski's scholarly interests include online education, data visualization, experiential learning, and educational technology. She has consulted with for profit, nonprofit and government agencies to conceptualize design and evaluate online educational, business and social media projects. She is the author of Data Visualization Made Simple: Insights into Becoming Visual (2018), Essentials of Online Course Design: A Standards-based Guide (2015, 2011) and The Savvy Students Guide to Online Learning (2013).

Before joining NYU Stern, Sosulski served as a clinical assistant professor of digital communications and media at NYU's School of Professional Studies, where she held positions as the Assistant Divisional Dean of Programs in Business, the Academic Director of Distance Learning, and the Academic Director of NYU Online: Undergraduate Degrees for Adults and the M.S. in Instructional Design and Corporate Training program. Prior to joining NYU, she worked for the Columbia University Center for New Media Teaching and Learning as a project manager, and taught computer programming in the Math, Science and Technology department at Columbia University Teachers College.

Sosulski received a B.S. in information and systems, and management and organizational behavior from New York University Stern School of Business. She received an M.A., Ed.M. and Ed.D. from Columbia University.

== Publications ==
- Data Visualization Made Simple: Insights into Becoming Visual (2018)
- Essentials of Online Course Design: A Standards-based Guide (2015, 2011)
- The Savvy Students Guide to Online Learning (2013)

== See also ==
- Information Systems
- Data Visualization
