= Employment practices liability =

Employment practices liability is an area of United States labor law that deals with wrongful termination, sexual harassment, discrimination, invasion of privacy, false imprisonment, breach of contract, emotional distress, and wage and hour law violations. It may be categorized as a form of professional liability. Employment practices liability insurance (EPL) is sold as a type of management liability insurance, which is related to professional liability insurance.

Most commonly, employment practices liability deals with laws and protections brought under Title VII of the Civil Rights Act of 1964, the ADA (Americans with Disabilities Act) of 1990, the Civil Rights Act of 1991, ADEA (Age Discrimination in Employment Act) of 1967, and Family and Medical Leave Act (FMLA). The Equal Employment Opportunity Commission (EEOC) interprets and enforces these laws.

The EEOC recognizes eleven types of employment practices discrimination: age, disability, equal pay/compensation, genetic information, national origin, pregnancy, race/color, religion, retaliation, sex, and sexual harassment.

Analysis of annual claims totals suggests that EPL claims rates correspond to unemployment rates: from 2007 to 2008, total claims in the U.S. jumped 13% as mass layoffs increased by roughly a third. In 2012, charges of retaliation, race, and sex discrimination (including harassment and pregnancy) were the most common types of discrimination that prompted EPL filings.

== EPL insurance ==
A growing product on the insurance markets is employment practices liability insurance (EPL), a type of policy that business owners can buy to protect their organizations against employee suits for rights protected under acts above. More recently, with the expansion of privacy law(s), employee privacy concerns have come to the fore as private employee data is stored electronically. This is not always covered under an EPL policy, but the insurance industry has responded by offering cyber liability and network security policies.

Importantly, there are both federal and state statutes that govern an employer's liability to its employees. Laws also differ from state to state; e.g., California, is often considered a pro-employee state when it comes to employers' liability.

Like most kinds of professional liability insurance, EPL insurance policies operate on a claims-made basis. This means that policyholders can only receive insurance benefits if they are covered both at the time of the discrimination incident that triggered the claim and at the time when the claim is filed.
