= Daniel Schuman =

American lawyer

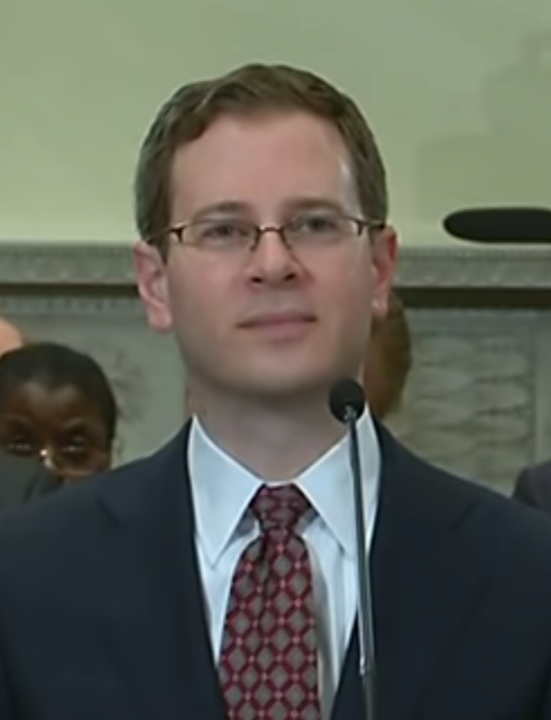
- Education: Emory University (BA, JD)
- Occupation(s): Lawyer, Policy Advocate
- Employer: American Governance Institute
- Notable work: Every CRS Report; First Branch Forecast; OpenGov Jobs List

Daniel Schuman is an American lawyer, technologist, and government transparency advocate serving CEO of the American Governance Institute. He is an expert on good government policies in the legislative branch of the United States. He was instrumental in the push to ensure public disclosure of CRS Reports, running a website called EveryCRSReport, which publishes all reports authored by the Congressional Research Service.

Schuman has worked at Sunlight Foundation, Citizens for Responsibility and Ethics in Washington, Demand Progress, and POPVox Foundation. He runs the OpenGov Jobs listserv for transparency-focused positions, and was formerly a fellow with CodeX: the Stanford Center for Legal Informatics.

Schuman regularly testifies in front of the United States Congress as a transparency advocate. He "successfully lobbied for the creation of the Office of the Whistleblower Ombuds," an office in the House of Representatives dedicated to working with whistleblowers."

In 2024, Schuman founded a new nonprofit, the American Governance Institute, focused on improving processes and outcomes in the United States Congress. He also writes and edits First Branch Forecast, a weekly email newsletter focused on government accountability.
