= Yale Journal of Law and Technology =

- Discipline: Law
- Language: English
- Edited by: S. Frederick Liu

Publication details
- Publisher: Yale Law School (United States)
- Frequency: biannual

Standard abbreviations
- Bluebook: Yale J.L. & Tech.
- ISO 4: Yale J. Law Technol.

Indexing
- ISSN: 2766-2403

Links
- Journal homepage

The Yale Journal of Law & Technology (YJoLT), formerly Yale Symposium on Law & Technology, is a law review of Yale Law School. It was founded in 1999.

The 2014 Washington and Lee Law Review Rankings rated YJoLT the 75th overall law review, 30th in impact factor, the #1 online law review, and the #3 law review for "intellectual property" & "science, technology, and computing".

According to its website, it is the first online-only law journal. It publishes twice annually.
