= Allan L. Schuman =

American former CEO

Allan Lester Schuman (born May 24, 1934) is the former CEO of Ecolab, Inc. He resigned as chairman of the board in May 2006 and was named chairman emeritus, an honorary position. He worked at Ecolab for 49 years. Mr. Schuman currently holds board positions at Tanger Factory Outlets and The Schwan Food Company. The son of a butcher, hailing from the Bronx, New York City, he began to work as an Ecolab salesman in 1957 and was named CEO in 1995. He holds an M.B.A. from the New York University Stern School of Business.
