= Maiden Holdings =

Maiden Holdings, Ltd.
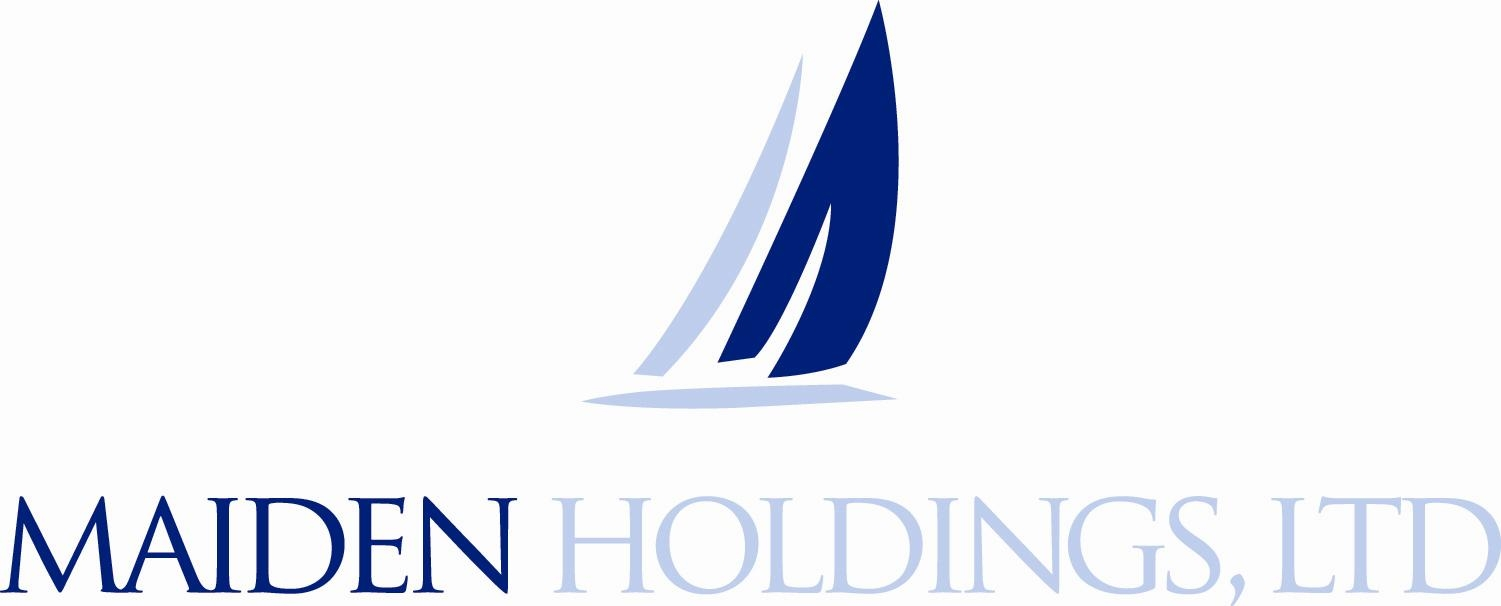
- Traded as: Nasdaq: MHLD
- Headquarters: Hamilton, Bermuda
- Website: maiden.bm

Maiden Holdings Ltd. (Nasdaq: MHLD) is a Bermuda based holding company with insurance subsidiaries that provides specialty reinsurance products for the global property and casualty market. The company has operating subsidiaries in the United States (Maiden Re, Maiden Specialty), Europe (Maiden International), and Bermuda (Maiden Insurance).

== Milestones ==
- 2007 - Maiden Holdings, Ltd. formed in Bermuda.
- 2008 - Maiden Holdings acquires GMAC RE and rebrands the operation as Maiden Re.
- 2010 - Maiden Holdings acquires GMAC International Insurance Services, Ltd.’s reinsurance business.
