= Model N (company) =

American software company

Coordinates: 37°32′13″N 122°15′30″W

Model N, Inc.
- Type: Private
- Traded as: NYSE: MODN
- Founded: December 1999; 26 years ago
- Headquarters: San Mateo, California, U.S.
- Area served: Worldwide
- Key people: Bret Connor (Chief Executive Officer); Amar Jani (Chief Financial Officer)
- Revenue: ▲US$249 million (2023)
- Owner: Vista Equity Partners
- Number of employees: 1,089 (2023)
- Website: modeln.com

Model N, Inc. is an American software company founded in 1999 and headquartered in San Mateo, California. The company offers revenue management software technology and life sciences companies. The company went public in 2013 and was taken private by Vista Equity Partners in 2024.

== History ==
Zack Rinat, the co-developer of NetDynamics Application Server, left Sun Microsystems to found Model N in 1999.

In 2004, the company added a Medicaid Claims Processing application to its Revenue Management Suite main product.

In the spring of 2006, Model N completed an acquisition of Azerity, a software company that focused on pricing and quoting practices for the high tech industry. In early 2012, Model N acquired LeapFrogRX, an analytics company based in Waltham, Massachusetts.

In 2013, the company went public under the New York Stock Exchange ticker symbol MODN, raising about US$100 million. Venture capital firm Accel-KKR backed the initial public offering.

In 2024, Vista Equity Partners announced that it would take the company private in a $1.25 billion deal.

== Corporate governance ==
In January 2025, Bret Connor was announced as Model N's Chief Executive Officer (CEO).
