= Alexander Ljungqvist =

Swedish academic

- Born: Hamburg, Germany
- Occupation: Professor
- Employer: Stockholm School of Economics
- Title: Stefan Persson Family Professor in Entrepreneurial Finance
- Board member of: Agenta Investment Management
- Website: SSE Faculty

Alexander Ljungqvist is a Swedish economist and professor of finance at the Stockholm School of Economics, where he holds the Stefan Persson Family Chair in Entrepreneurial Finance. His research focuses on corporate finance and entrepreneurial finance, including topics such as initial public offerings, investment banking, and private equity.

== Biography ==
Ljungqvist received an MSc in economics and business from Lund University in Sweden and MA, MPhil, and DPhil degrees in economics from Nuffield College, University of Oxford. He subsequently taught at the Saïd Business School and Merton College, Oxford, where he held the Bankers Trust Fellowship, before joining the New York University Stern School of Business in 2000. At NYU he later held the Ira Rennert Chair in Finance and Entrepreneurship and directed the Salomon Center and the Berkley Center for Entrepreneurial Studies. In 2018 he joined the Stockholm School of Economics as professor of finance.

Ljungqvist holds or has held visiting appointments at Dartmouth College, Harvard Business School, Northwestern University's Kellogg School of Management, London Business School, the University of Sydney, Tokyo University, National University of Singapore, and Cambridge University, where he was Sir Evelyn de Rothschild Fellow.

From 2008 to 2014 he served as editor of the Review of Financial Studies. He is a research fellow of the Centre for Economic Policy Research in London, a founder and senior academic fellow of the Asian Bureau of Financial and Economic Research in Singapore, a member of the European Corporate Governance Institute in Brussels, and a co‑founder of the Nordic Initiative for Corporate Economics (NICE). He was previously a research associate of the National Bureau of Economic Research in Cambridge, Massachusetts.

== Business experience ==
Ljungqvist serves on the Board of Agenta Investment Management, a Stockholm-based fund manager. In 2018-2025, Ljungqvist served on the board of directors of the Sixth Swedish National Pension Fund (AP6), which invested in private equity, venture capital funds, and unlisted companies on behalf of the Swedish public pension system. He has previously served as a securities market regulator via the Nasdaq Listing Council and has taken part in expert groups for the World Economic Forum and the UK Department for Business, including the review of the UK equity markets in 2014. He has also served on the supervisory board of mAbxience SA and on the board of the Stockholm School of Economics.

In the 2000s Ljungqvist designed alternative investment strategies for Deutsche Bank Securities and Deutsche Bank Asset Management. Earlier in his career he was a senior consultant with OXERA Ltd, advising clients on regulatory economics and corporate strategy, and has since consulted on private equity, corporate finance, and related topics for a range of public institutions and private organizations.

== Honors and awards ==
In 2011, Ljungqvist received the Ewing Marion Kauffman Prize Medal for Distinguished Research in Entrepreneurship. In 2019 and again in 2024, he was appointed a Wallenberg Scholar by the Knut and Alice Wallenberg Foundation. In 2024, he was awarded an Advanced Grant by the European Research Council.

His research has been supported by grants and awards from organizations such as the Wallander Foundation and the Thule Foundation, and he has held named chairs and visiting professorships at institutions including the Stockholm School of Economics, New York University, the University of Michigan, and the Hong Kong University of Science and Technology. He has also received several teaching awards from Oxford University, New York University, and the Stockholm School of Economics.

== Publications ==
- Chang, Y.C.; Ljungqvist, A. & Tseng, K. (2023). Do Corporate Disclosures Constrain Strategic Analyst Behavior?. Review of Financial Studies.
- Chang, Y.C.; Hsiao, P.J.; Ljungqvist, A. & Tseng, K. (2022). Testing Disagreement Models. Journal of Finance.
- Hegde, D.; Ljungqvist, A. & Raj, M. (2022). Quick or Broad Patents? Evidence from U.S. Startups. Review of Financial Studies.
- Farre-Mensa, J.; Hegde, D. & Ljungqvist, A. (2020). What is a Patent Worth? Evidence from the U.S. Patent 'Lottery'. Journal of Finance.
- Ljungqvist, A.; M. Richardson & D. Wolfenzon (2020). The Investment Behavior of Buyout Fund Managers. Financial Management.
- Back, K.; P. Collin-Dufresne; V. Fos; T. Li & A. Ljungqvist (2018). Activism, Strategic Trading, and Liquidity. Econometrica.
- Ljungqvist, A.; L. Zhang & L. Zuo (2017). Sharing Risk with the Government: How Taxes Affect Corporate Risk-taking. Journal of Accounting Research.
- Ljungqvist, A. & W. Qian (2016). How Constraining Are Limits to Arbitrage?. Review of Financial Studies.
- Farre-Mensa, J. & A. Ljungqvist (2016). Do Measures of Financial Constraints Measure Financial Constraints?. Review of Financial Studies.
- Asker, J.; J. Farre-Mensa & A. Ljungqvist (2015). Corporate Investment and Stock Market Listing: A Puzzle?. Review of Financial Studies.
- Heider, F. & A. Ljungqvist (2015). As Certain as Debt and Taxes: Estimating the Tax Sensitivity of Leverage from State Tax Changes. Journal of Financial Economics.
- Balakrishnan, K.; M. Billings; B. Kelly & A. Ljungqvist (2014). Shaping Liquidity: On the Causal Effects of Voluntary Disclosure. Journal of Finance.
- Hochberg, Y.; A. Ljungqvist & A. Vissing-Jørgensen (2014). Informational Hold-up and Performance Persistence in Venture Capital. Review of Financial Studies.
- Cornelli, F.; Z. Kominek & A. Ljungqvist (2013). Monitoring managers: Does it matter?. Journal of Finance.
- Kelly, B. & Ljungqvist, A. (2012). Testing Asymmetric-Information Asset Pricing Models. Review of Financial Studies.
- Ljungqvist, A. (2012). Disruptive Innovation: Are Stock Exchanges Under Threat?. World Economic Forum.
- Asker, J. & Ljungqvist, A. (2010). Competition and the Structure of Vertical Relationships in Capital Markets. Journal of Political Economy.
- Hochberg, Y.; Ljungqvist, A. & Lu, Y. (2010). Networking as a Barrier to Entry and the Competitive Supply of Venture Capital. Journal of Finance.
- Ljungqvist, A.; F. Marston & W. J. Wilhelm (2009). Scaling the Hierarchy: How and Why Investment Banks Compete for Syndicate Co-Management Appointments. Review of Financial Studies.
- Brown, S.J.; M. Kacperczyk; A. Ljungqvist; A. Lynch; L. Pedersen & M. Richardson (2009). Hedge Funds in the Aftermath of the Financial Crisis. Restoring Financial Stability: How to Repair a Failed System (Wiley).
- Ljungqvist, A.; F. Marston & C. Malloy (2009). Rewriting History. Journal of Finance.
- Kelly, B. & Ljungqvist, A. (2008). The Value of Research. CEPR Working Paper.
- Ljungqvist, A.; F. Marston; L. Starks; K. Wei & H. Yan (2007). Conflicts of Interest in Sell-side Research and the Moderating Role of Institutional Investors. Journal of Financial Economics.
- Chemla, G.; Habib, M.A. & Ljungqvist, A. (2007). An Analysis of Shareholder Agreements. Journal of the European Economic Association.
- Hochberg, Y.; Ljungqvist, A. & Lu, Y. (2007). Whom You Know Matters: Venture Capital Networks and Investment Performance. Journal of Finance.
- Ljungqvist, A. (2007). IPO underpricing. North-Holland Handbook of Corporate Finance.
- Ljungqvist, A.; V. Nanda & R. Singh (2006). Hot Markets, Investor Sentiment, and IPO Pricing. Journal of Business.
- Cornelli, F.; Goldreich, D. & Ljungqvist, A. (2006). Investor Sentiment and Pre-Issue Markets. Journal of Finance.
- Ljungqvist, A.; F. Marston & W.J. Wilhelm (2006). Competing for Securities Underwriting Mandates: Banking Relationships and Analyst Recommendations. Journal of Finance.
- Habib, M.A. & Ljungqvist, A. (2005). Firm Value and Managerial Incentives. Journal of Business.
- Ljungqvist, A. & W. J. Wilhelm (2005). Does Prospect Theory Explain IPO Market Behavior?. Journal of Finance.
- Benveniste, L.; Ljungqvist, A.; W. J. Wilhelm & X. Yu (2003). Evidence of Information Spillovers in the Production of Investment Banking Services. Journal of Finance.
- Ljungqvist, A. & W. J. Wilhelm (2003). IPO Pricing in the Dot-com Bubble. Journal of Finance.
- Ljungqvist, A.; T. J. Jenkinson & W. J. Wilhelm (2003). Global Integration of Primary Equity Markets: The Role of U.S. Banks and U.S. Investors. Review of Financial Studies.
- Ljungqvist, A. & M. Richardson (2003). The Cash Flow, Return and Risk Characteristics of Private Equity IPOs. NBER Working Paper.
- Ljungqvist, A. & W. J. Wilhelm (2002). IPO Allocations: Discriminatory or Discretionary?. Journal of Financial Economics.
- Ljungqvist, A. (2002). Conflicts of Interest and Efficient Contracting in IPOs. NYU Working Paper.
- Habib, M.A. & Ljungqvist, A. (2001). Underpricing and Entrepreneurial Wealth Losses in IPOs: Theory and Evidence. Review of Financial Studies.
- Jenkinson, T.J. & Ljungqvist, A. (2001). The Role of Hostile Stakes in German Corporate Governance. Journal of Corporate Finance.
- Jenkinson, T.J. & Ljungqvist, A. (2001). Going Public: The Theory and Evidence on How Companies Raise Equity Finance (Second Revised ed.). Oxford University Press.
- Habib, M.A. & Ljungqvist, A. (1998). Underpricing and IPO Proceeds: A Note. Economics Letters.
- Ljungqvist, A. (1997). The Pricing of Initial Public Offerings-Further Evidence from Germany. European Economic Review.
- Jenkinson, T.J. & Ljungqvist, A. (1996). Going Public: The Theory and Evidence on How Companies Raise Equity Finance. Oxford University Press.
