= Kollam Azhintha Andu =

Kollam Azhintha Andu (Tamil: கொல்லம் அழிந்த ஆண்டு; Malayalam: കൊല്ലം അഴിഞ്ഞ ആണ്ട്), translating to "The Year Kollam Was Destroyed", was a calendar era inaugurated by the Pandyas in 1097/98 AD. Its commencement marked the Chola reconquest of the port of Kollam on the Malabar Coast around 1097/98 CE.

The era is mentioned in Koyil Ozhuku, the chronicle of the Srirangam temple, as well as in several other historical manuscripts.

The calendar era was short-lived and appears to have been in use for only a few hundred years. The calendar may have been deliberately named in contrast to the Kollam Thonri Andu (the Kollam Era, which began in 825 CE).
