= Kulasekhara Alvar =

Bhakti theologian and devotional poet

Kulasekhara
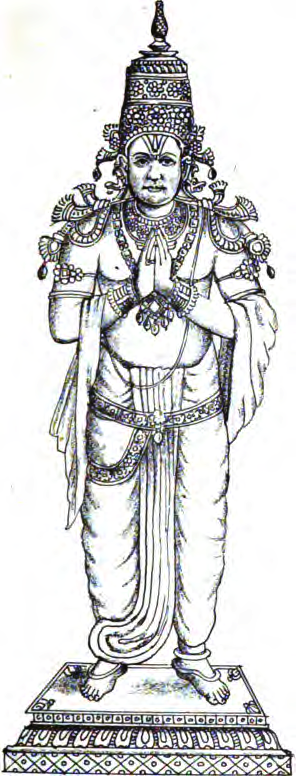
- A 19th century depiction of Kulasekhara Alvar (from 'A History of Travancore from the Earliest Times' by P. Shungoonny Menon)

Alvar
- Venerated in: Hinduism
- Major shrine: Thrikkulasekharapuram Temple, Kodungallur
- Tradition or genre: Vaishnavite tradition (Bhakti)
- Major works: Perumal Tirumoli (Tamil); Mukundamala (Sanskrit)

Kulasekhara (Tamil: குலசேகரர்; IAST: Kulaśekhara; fl. 9th century CE), one of the twelve Vaishnavite alvars, was a bhakti theologian and devotional poet from medieval south India. He was the author of "Perumal Tirumoli" in Tamil and "Mukundamala" in Sanskrit. The Perumal Tirumoli, whose second decade is known as "Tetrarum Tiral", is compiled as a part of Nalayira Divya Prabandham. The Thrikkulasekharapuram Temple in Kodungallur is associated with Kulasekhara Alvar.

Vaishnavite traditions portray Kulasekhara as a ruler from the Chera royal family of the Western Country (present-day Kerala). Based on these accounts, scholars identify Kulasekhara with the Chera playwright-king Kulasekhara Varma or Sthanu Ravi Kulasekhara, who reigned from 844/45 to c. 870/71 CE and is considered the earliest known Chera ruler of medieval Kerala.

== Sources ==
Epigraphical references to the compositions of Kulasekhara appear from 11th century CE onwards in the Tamil country. According to a Srirangam inscription dated to the 18th regnal year of Chola king Kulottunga I (1088 CE), the Tetrarum Tiral (or the Perumal Tirumoli) was recited daily at the Srirangam Temple. Additionally, an inscription at the Thrikkulasekharapuram Temple in Kodungallur, Kerala, dated to temple era 195, has been epigraphically assigned to the 11th or 12th century CE, thereby placing the foundation of the temple in the 9th or 10th century CE).

A record from the Kulasekhara Alvar Koyil in Mannarkovil, Tirunelveli notes that the temple was consecrated in memory of "Kulasekhara Perumal" by certain Vasudevan Kesevan from "Mullappalli" in "Malai Mandalam" (Kerala). It is noteworthy that the earliest extant inscription from the temple dates to c. 1015 CE (4th regnal year of Rajendra Chola).

A 13th-century Tamil inscription from Bagan in Mandalay (Myanmar) is prefaced by a sloka from "Mukundamala". It records the construction of a mandapa for god Vishnu, along with an endowment for a lamp by Rayiran Chiriyan "Kulasekhara Nampi" from "Makotayar Pattanam" (Kodungallur) in "Malai Mandalam" (Kerala).

== Biography ==
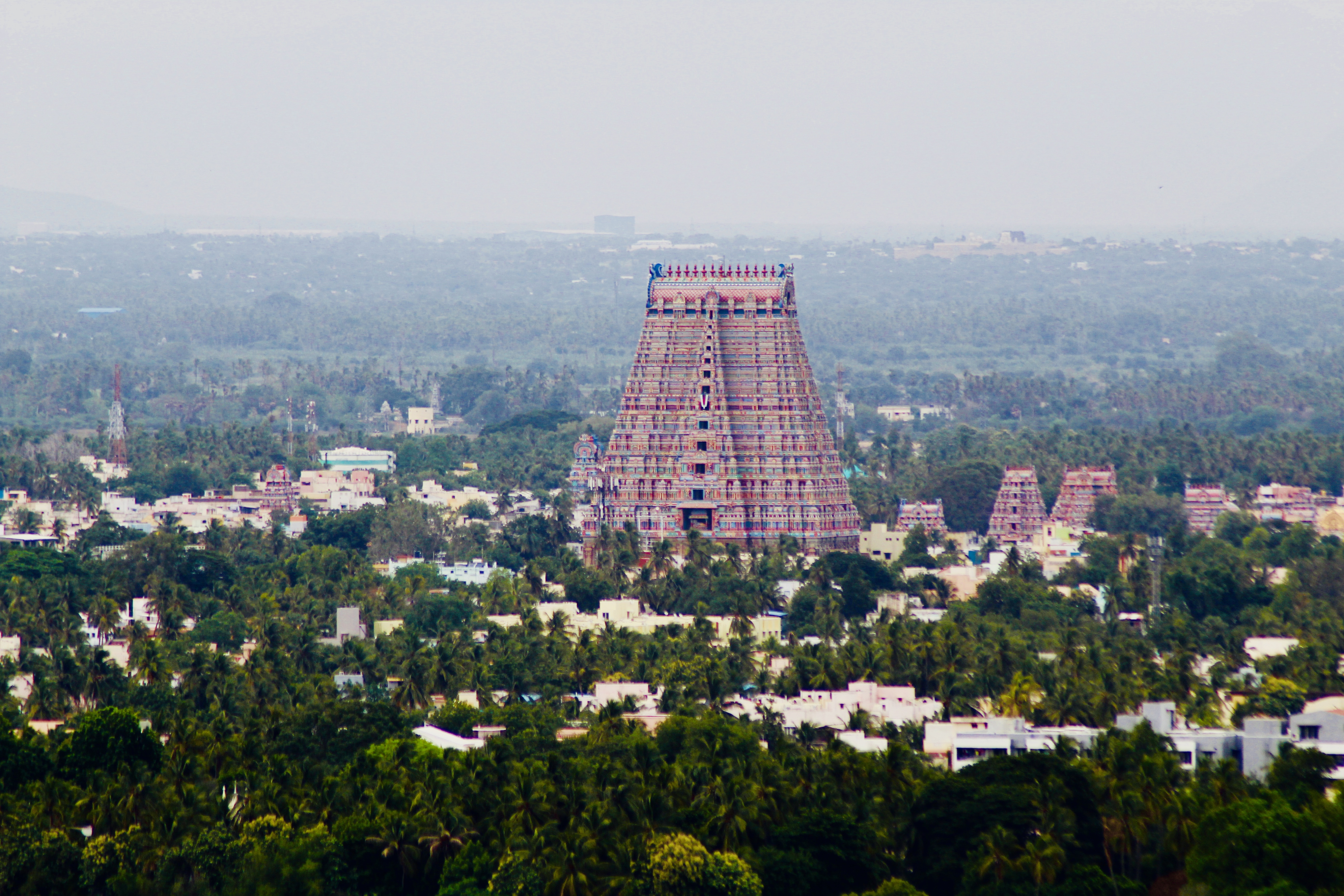
Srirangam Temple

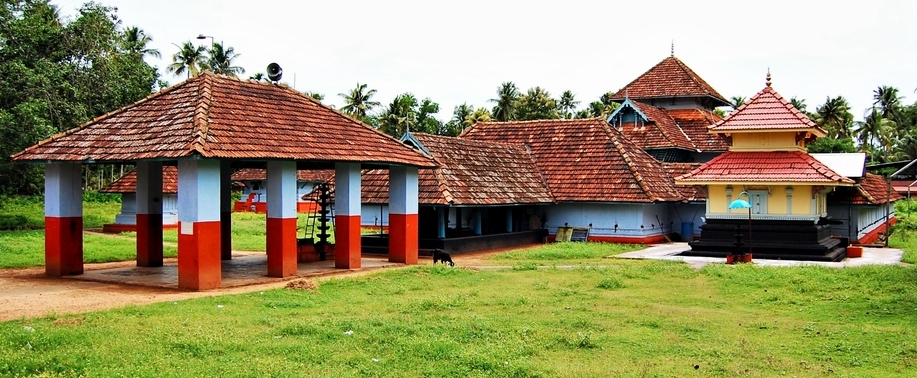
Trikkulasekharapuram Temple

The following is the traditional biography of king Kulasekhara, based on sources generally dated to the 12th–14th centuries CE.

Kulasekhara was born at Vanchi, in the Western Country (Kerala), in Kali Era 28 to the Chera ruler "Dridhavrata". When Kulasekhara came of age, his father abdicated the throne and retired from public life, as was customary, allowing Kulasekhara to ascend as the new king.

Young Kulasekhara was a devoted follower of god Vishnu. His devotion was so profound that it is said that, upon hearing the story of how the demon king Ravana abducted Sita, he immediately ordered his warriors to prepare for an invasion of Lanka. On another occasion, a jealous minister, envious of the king's favor toward Vaishnavites, falsely accused the devotees of wrongdoing. To prove their innocence, Kulasekhara successfully underwent the Trial by Ordeal, placing his hand into a pot containing snakes.

Later, Kulasekhara renounced his throne and embarked on a pilgrimage to the holy site of Srirangam. He spent several years there worshiping lord Vishnu and arranged the marriage of his daughter, "Cherakula Valli Nachiyar", to the deity of the Srirangam Temple. As part of the dowry, he donated all his royal wealth, constructed the "Chenaivenran Mandapa", and repaired the temple's prakara, which was thereafter known as "Kulasekhara Tiruvidi." He continued his pilgrimage, visiting the sacred temples of Tiruvenkatam, Tiruvayodhya, Tillai-Chitrakutam, Tirukannapuram, Tirumalirunjolai, and Tiruvitruvakkode (in Palakkad district), before finally settling in Brahmadesam near Tirukkurukur, the birthplace of Nammalvar. He died there at the age of sixty-seven.

The shrine of Cherakula Valli Nachiyar within the Srirangam Temple Complex commemorates the daughter of king Kulasekhara.

== Literary contributions ==
Kulasekhara was the author of "Perumal Tirumoli" in Tamil and "Mukundamala" in Sanskrit. Kulasekhara Alvar's poems are deeply devotional, dedicated to the principal avataras of Vishnu — Rama and Krishna. He immerses himself in their lives, identifying with various roles in their divine narratives.

As a devotee of Rama, Kulasekhara internalizes the suffering of both Rama and his aged father, Dasaratha, as his own. His devotion is so profound that he regards Vishnu's devotees as manifestations of the god himself. In one composition, he adopts the perspective of Devaki, Krishna's birth mother, from whom Krishna was taken to Gokula to be raised by his foster parents, Nanda and Yasoda. Kulasekhara movingly expresses Devaki's sorrow at being separated from her child and her longing for reunion. In other poems, he sometimes envisions himself as a gopi deeply in love with Krishna, embodying the intense devotion and yearning characteristic of the bhakti tradition.

== Kulasekhara Varma ==
Kulasekhara Alvar is generally identified with "Kulasekhara Varma", the dramatist-king of medieval Kerala. Kulasekhara Varma is credited with authoring two Sanskrit plays, Tapatisamvarana and Subhadradhananjaya, as well as the Sanskrit champu kavya Ascharya Manjari. He is also possibly the author of the Sanskrit play Vicchinnabhiseka. In his works, Kulasekhara Varma refers to himself as Keralakula-chudamani ("the Crown Jewel of the Chera dynasty"), Keraladhinatha ("the King of the Chera Country"), and Mahodayapura-paramesvara ("the Lord of the City of Makotai"). An inscription from Chembra (954/55 CE) records a performance of Tapatisamvarana.

The Kerala art-form Kudiyattam is traditionally associated with Kulasekhara Varma and his courtier Tolan. Additionally, "Dhananjaya Samvarana Dhvani", or the "Vyangyavyakhya", makes reference to a king Kulasekhara of Mahodayapuram.

Kulasekhara Varma, the dramatist, is sometimes identified with king Rama Kulashekhara, another medieval Chera ruler of Kerala (and as the patron of the Yamaka poet Vasubhatta, author of "Tripuradahana", "Saurikathodaya", and "Yudhisthiravijaya"). This identification, however, is not generally regarded as reliable.

== In popular culture ==
- The name of the British rock band Kula Shaker was inspired by Kulasekhara.
