= Irayiran Chiriyan =

Irayiran Chiriyan, known as Kulacekara Nampi, was a 13th-century Indian Ocean merchant magnate from Kodungallur in the present-day Kerala. He was probably a member of the Indian merchant guild Nanadesikal (Ayyavole Ainutruvar).

He is known for his donations to a Vishnu temple at Myingpagan, a mile south of Pagan, Myanmar.

== Pagan Inscription of Irayiran Chiriyan ==
- Originally part of a Vishu temple in Pagan.
- Engraved on a sandstone.
- Now preserved at National Museum, Pagan.
- Discovered by A. T. Arundel, CSI.
- Impression by Taw Sein Ko.
- Language: Tamil (Tamil script).

Let there be prosperity.

I, Irayiran Chiriyan alias Kulacekara Nampi, of Makotayar Pattanam in Malaimantalam, erected the front hall in the [Vishnu] temple, called 'Nanatechi Vinnakar' at Pukkam alias Arivattanapuram, fixed the gate and gifted a lamp to burn in this hall continuously.

This charity is to be known as 'Malaimantalattan'.

The Tamil portion is prefaced by a Sanskrit sloka (Grantha) from verse 6, Mukundamala (referring to the intense devotion of the towards Vishnu).

Let there be prosperity. [I have] no regard for merit, none for a heap of wealth, none at all for the enjoyment of lust. Whatever is to happen, O God! [will happen] in accordance with previous actions. This [alone] is to be prayed for [and] highly valued by me. In every other birth also let [me] possess unswerving devotion to the pair of thy lotus-feet!

— Mukundamala
