= Ranganathaswamy Temple, Srirangam =

Hindu temple in Tamil Nadu, India

Ranganathaswamy Temple Srirangam
- அருள்மிகு திருவரங்கம் ரங்கநாதர் திருக்கோயில்
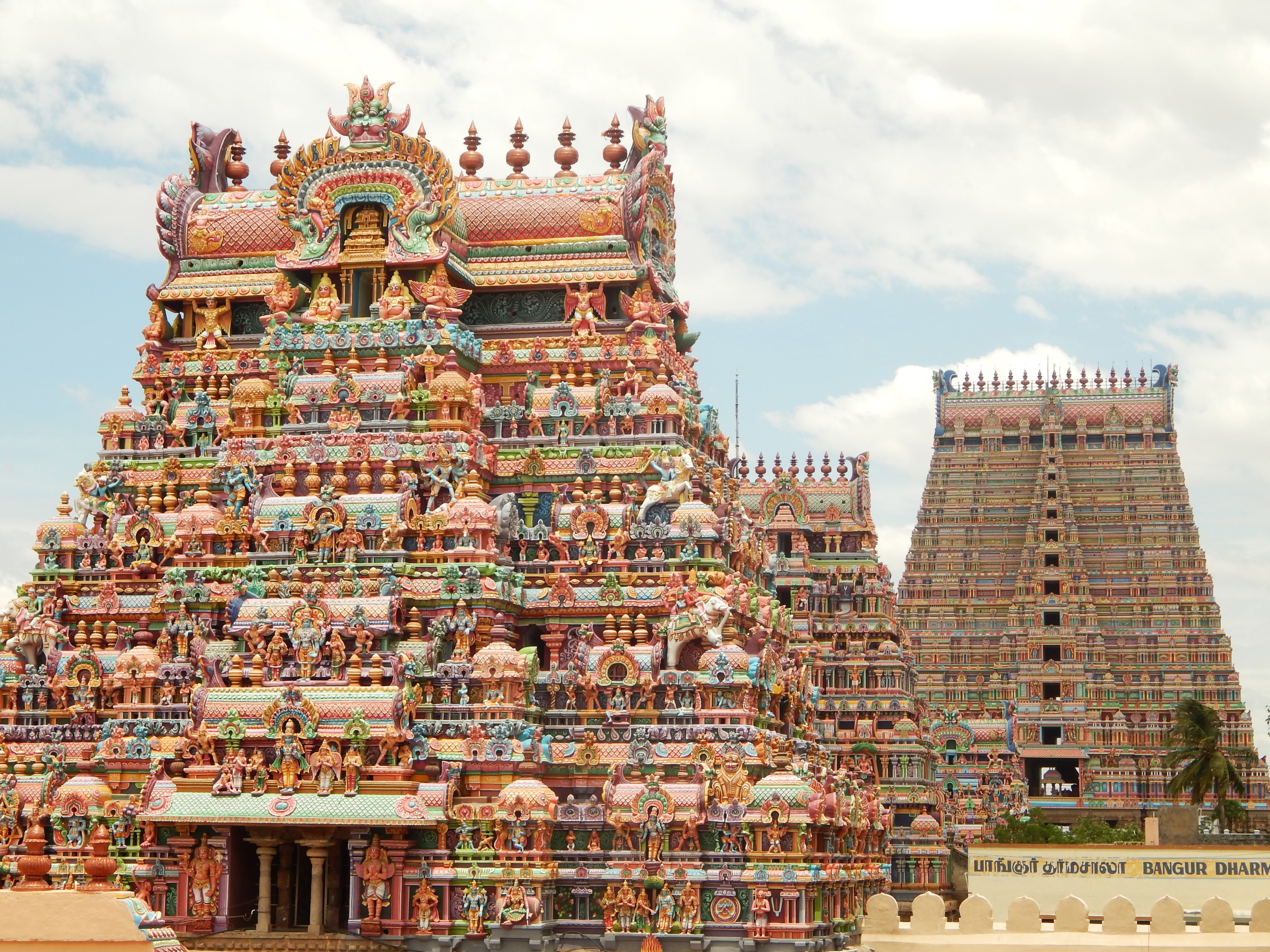
- Srirangam Temple gopurams

- Location in Tamil Nadu Ranganathaswamy Temple, Srirangam (India)

Religion
- Affiliation: Hinduism
- District: Tiruchirapalli
- Deity: Ranganathar Perumal Ranganayaki
- Festivals: Vaikuntha Ekadashi; Uriyadi; Jeeyarpuram
- Features: Tower: Pranavakara Vimanam.

Location
- Location: Srirangam
- State: Tamil Nadu
- Country: India
- Interactive map of Ranganathaswamy Temple; Srirangam
- Coordinates: 10°51′45″N 78°41′23″E

Architecture
- Type: Tamil
- Creator: Early Cholas, Medieval Cholas, Later Cholas, Pandyas, Hoysala, Vijayanagara Empire
- Inscriptions: over 600 (Note: The entire ASI Epigraphia Indica Volume XXIV is dedicated to these inscriptions.)

Website
- https://srirangamranganathar.hrce.tn.gov.in/

The Ranganathaswamy Temple, also known as Arulmigu Ranganathar Thirukovil, is a Hindu temple dedicated to Ranganathar (a form of Vishnu) and his consort Ranganayaki (a form of Lakshmi). The temple is located in Srirangam, Tiruchirappalli, Tamil Nadu, India. Constructed in the Tamil architectural style, the temple is glorified by the Tamil poet-saints called the Alvars in their canon, the Naalayira Divya Prabhandham, and has the unique distinction of being the foremost among the 108 Divya Desams dedicated to the god Vishnu. The Srirangam temple stands as the largest functioning religious complex in the world in active worship with a continuous historical presence as a Hindu temple. Some of these structures have been renovated, expanded, and rebuilt over the centuries as a living temple. The latest addition is the outer rajagopuram (tower) that is approximately 73 metres (240 ft) tall, which was completed in 1987 with support from the Ahobila Mutt among others. The temple is a thriving Hindu house of worship and follows the Thenkalai tradition of Sri Vaishnavism, based on the Pancharatra Agama. The annual 21-day festival conducted during the Tamil month of Margazhi (December–January) attracts one million visitors. The temple complex has been nominated as a UNESCO World Heritage Site and is in UNESCO's tentative list. In 2017, the temple won the UNESCO Asia-Pacific Award of Merit for cultural heritage conservation, making it the first temple in Tamil Nadu to receive the award from UNESCO. The temple is notable for its vibrant colors; the BBC ranked it as "one of the most colorful buildings in the world."

It is among the most illustrious Vaishnava temples in the world, rich in legend and history. The deity finds a mention in the Sanskrit epic Ramayana which is dated to between the 4th century BCE and the 3rd century CE (completed version). The temple has played an important role in Vaishnava history starting with the 11th-century career of Ramanuja and his predecessors Nathamuni and Yamunacharya in Srirangam. Its location, on an island between the Kollidam and Kaveri rivers, has rendered it vulnerable to flooding as well as the rampaging of invading armies which repeatedly commandeered the site for military encampment. The temple was looted and destroyed by the Delhi Sultanate armies in a broad plunder raid on various cities of the Pandyan kingdom in the early 14th century. The temple was rebuilt in the late 14th century, the site fortified and expanded with many more gopurams in the 16th and 17th centuries. It was one of the hubs of early Bhakti movement with a devotional singing and dance tradition, but this tradition stopped during the 14th century and was revived in a limited way much later.

The temple and temple town occupy an area of 63 hectares (155 acres) with 81 shrines, 21 towers, 39 pavilions, and many water tanks integrated into the complex. The temple town is a significant archaeological and epigraphical site, providing a historic window into the early and mid medieval South Indian society and culture. Numerous inscriptions suggest that this Hindu temple served not only as a spiritual center, but also a major economic and charitable institution that operated education and hospital facilities, ran a free kitchen, and financed regional infrastructure projects from the gifts and donations it received. (Note: According to Burton Stein, "(...) the stone and copper inscriptions, the basic historical sources of this period, give more information about temples (...) temples mobilized resources of land and money second only to the state and were therefore capable of financing such projects." (...) "During the Chola period, for example, a series of Srirangam temple inscriptions from the reign of Kulottunga I (1070-1118) describe a gigantic process of redevelopment of a large portion of temple lands.")

The temple is part of the famous pilgrimage Tri Ranga darshana, where three ranga temples are visited on a single day, situated on the three naturally formed islands of Kaveri. Other two being Adi Ranga and Madhya Ranga.

== Location ==
The Ranganathaswamy Temple at Srirangam, also known as Periyakovil (Big Temple), and Bhooloka Vaikuntam is located about 12 kilometres (7.5 mi) north of the city of Tiruchirappalli, about 325 kilometres (200 mi) southwest of Chennai. The city is connected daily to other major cities by the network of Indian Railways, Tamil Nadu bus services and the Highway 38. The site is near the Tiruchirappalli International Airport (IATA: TRZ).

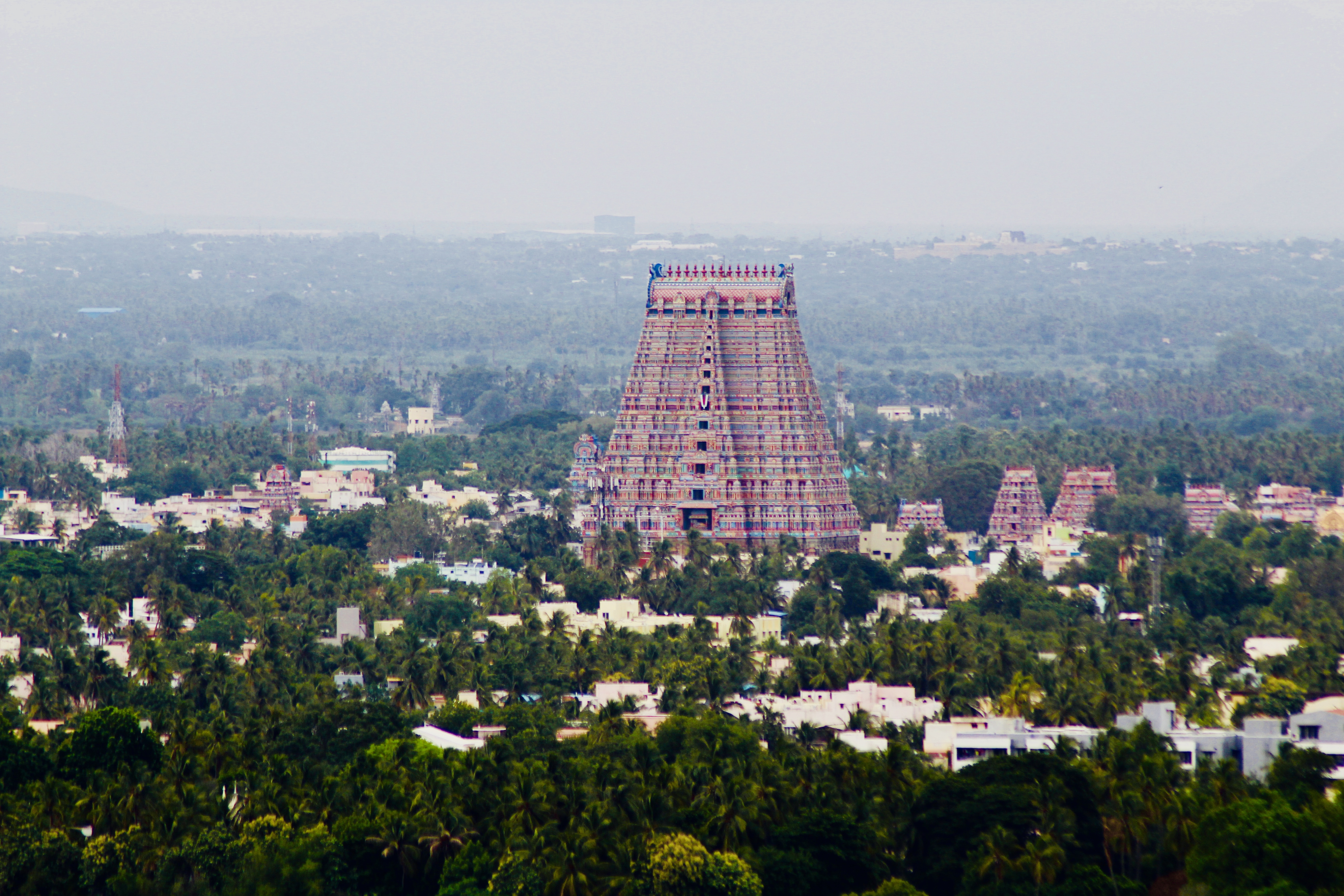
Srirangam temple complex across the river on left.

The temple site is on a large island bounded by the Kaveri River and Kollidam River. It is vast and planned as a temple town with Sapta-Prakaram design where the sanctum, gopuram, services and living area are co-located in seven concentric enclosures. Rampart walls were added after medieval centuries that saw its invasion and destruction. The temple monuments are located inside the inner five enclosures of the complex, surrounded by living area and infrastructure in outer two enclosures. Numerous gopurams connect the Sapta-Prakaram enclosures allowing the pilgrims and visitors to reach the sanctum from many directions. The site includes two major temples, one for Vishnu as Ranganatha, and the other to Shiva as Jambukeshvara. The island has some cave temples, older than both.

== Legend ==
The temple and its artwork are a subject of numerous different Tamil legends covered in regional Puranic texts. Sriranga Mahatmyam, for example, is one of the compilations of the temple mythology about its origins. According to it, Brahma was performing austerities during the Samudra Manthana (churning of cosmic ocean), and Srirangam Vimanam emerged as a result. It remained in Satyaloka for ages, and was brought to Ayodhya by king Ikshvaku. After Rama, an avatar of Vishnu, had killed the evil demon Ravana, he gave it to King Vibhishana, who wanted to be with Rama. When Vibhishana passed through Tiruchi en route to Sri Lanka, where he had become the king, the Srirangam Vimanam would not move from the island. So, he gave it to a local king called Dharmavarma, if the king consecrated the Vimanam to face the south cardinal direction eternally, blessing him and Lanka. Hence, it is that the deity (in a reclining posture) faces South, his body aligned to the east–west axis.

As per another legend, Sanaka, the four child sages, came for a darshana of Ranganatha in Srirangam. They were stopped by Jaya and Vijaya, the guardians of Vaikuntha. In spite of their pleadings, they were refused entry. In anger, all four of them cursed the guardians in one voice and left. The guardians approached Vishnu and told him about the curse. Ranganatha said that he would not be able to reverse the curse and gave them two options: be born as demons opposing Vishnu in three births or good human beings in the following seven births. Eager to be back with the Lord, the guardians accepted being demons and are believed to have taken the form of Hiranyaksha and Hiranyakasipu; Ravana and Kumbhakarna; and Sisupala and Dantavakra. Vishnu assumed four avatars – Varaha, Narasimha, Rama, and Krishna, respectively – to kill the demons in each one of those births.

The Mahabharata says that after Arjuna's marriage with Ulupi (the snake princess), he went to the various pilgrimage centres in South India. Arjuna is said to have visited this temple and offered prayers to Ranganatha. There is a mandapa (hall) called Arjuna Mandapa in the temple.

During the Alauddin Khilji invasion of the temple, the utsavar idol of Ranganatha was looted, while the Ranganayaki idol was buried under a tree. The Ranganatha idol was taken to Delhi and was about to be melted by Malik Kafur, but the Sultan's daughter (traditionally named Suratani) pleaded with him to give her the idol so that she could use it like a doll. Kafur agreed, and Suratani took the idol, placed it in her room, dressed it up with clothes, playfully fed it food and slept with the idol. Pleased by her service, Ranganatha kept on appearing in her dreams. A troop of brave Vaishnavites, disguised as entertainers, set out from Srirangam to Delhi. When they reached the Sultan's court, they entertained him. The Sultan was so pleased that when they asked for the return of the Ranganatha idol, he gave it back to them, upsetting Suratani. Suratani and Malik Kafur both followed the entertainers back to Srirangam. Suratani entered the temple first and, still not seeing the idol anywhere, immediately committed suicide in front of the sanctum door, symbolising that love brought back the idol.

Kafur saw Suratani's dead body and was enraged, starting a horrible war that killed 13,000 devotees. The temple dancers, led by Vellai Ammal, seduced some of the soldiers and put them in a death trap. The idol, however, was smuggled to Tirupati. Since the head priest didn't know the idol was taken out again and assumed that the idol was still missing, he hastily ordered for a new similar idol to be created. When the original idol returned, the surviving devotees were confused as to which idol was the original one. A blind washerman then tasted the water offered to both idols and correctly identified the original one. The idol was reinstalled, the goddess idol was found again, and the temple was restored to its former glory by the successive dynasties. In memory of Suratani, the temple priests deified her and installed a painting (Suratani's Muslim identity meant that she could not be a stone idol) of her as a goddess in the Arjuna Mandapa. Today, Suratani is known as Thulukka Nachiyar and is offered Chapatis as prasada. Only during Abhishekams, the Ranganatha idol is dressed up in a Muslim-style lungi to commemorate his love for Suratani and to symbolise interfaith harmony.

In total, Lord Ranganatha (Vishnu) of Srirangam is believed to have seven consorts, with Goddess Ranganayaki (Lakshmi) being the first and chief consort. The others are Goddess Bhudevi, Goddess Neeladevi, Andal, Kamalavalli (from the Uraiyur temple), Cherakulavalli, and Thulukka Nachiyar. Kamalavalli, Cherakulavalli and Thulukka Nachiyar are believed to be human royal princesses who were devoted to Ranganatha, and he married them due to their love for him. Kamalavalli is from the Chola dynasty, Cherakulavalli is from the Chera dynasty, while Thulukka Nachiyar is from the Delhi Sultanate. It was believed that when Ranganatha married these three princesses, Goddess Ranganayaki was upset and she distanced herself from him. She commanded her priests to keep her idol only in her shrine and nowhere else near her husband, earning her the epithet Padi Thandadha Pathni (The wife who never crosses her doorstep/limits). Even today, Ranganayaki and Ranganatha are seen together only once a year on the Panguni Uthram day (March–April), known as Serthi Sevai.

== History ==
The main deity of the temple is mentioned in various Sanskrit literature and epics such as the Ramayana, Mahabharata, Padma Purana, Brahmanda Purana and Garuda Puranam. There are mentions even in the Tamil literature of the Sangam era (300 BCE to the 300 CE), there are mentions in many books like Akanaṉūṟu, Purananuru, Paripāṭal and Silapadikaram. Example:- Silapadikaram (book 11, lines 35–40):

āyiram viritteḻu talaiyuṭai aruntiṟaṟ pāyaṟ paḷḷip palartoḻu tētta viritiraik kāviri viyaṉperu turuttit tiruvamar mārpaṉ kiṭanta vaṇṇamum

On a magnificent cot having a thousand heads spread out, worshipped and praised by many, in an islet surrounded by Kaveri with billowing waves, is the lying posture of the one who has Lakshmi sitting in his chest

— Silapadikaram (book 11, lines 35–40)

The temple was first built by the Chola ruler, Dharmavarma. The Kaveri river flood destroyed the temple vimanam, and later, the early Cholas King Killivalavan rebuilt the temple complex that is present today. There are many mandapas which were built near the main sanctum sanctorum which dates around 100 CE to 300 CE built by Uraiyur Cholas. There were later additions of structures and inscriptions in the temple which belong to the Chola, Pandya, Hoysala, Marathas and Vijayanagara dynasties who ruled over the region. These inscriptions range in date between the 7th and 17th centuries.

During the period of invasion and plunder by the Alauddin Khilji's Muslim general Malik Kafur and his Delhi Sultanate forces in 1311, the Arabic texts of the period state that he raided a "golden temple" on river "Kanobari" (Kaveri), destroyed the temple and took the plunder with the golden icon of the deity to Delhi. According to Steven P. Hopkins, this is believed to be the Ranganathaswamy Temple.

The Tamil texts that followed offer various inconsistent legends on how the temple regained the Vishnu icon. According to one found in Koil Oluku, a young girl had vowed to fast till she had seen the icon. She followed the Muslim army as it returned with the loot back to Delhi. There she sneaked into the palace and saw that the Sultan's daughter had fallen in love with the image. The young girl returned to Srirangam and told the priests about what she had seen in Delhi. The priests went with musicians to Delhi, found the icon in capriciously playful possession of the Sultan's daughter, day and night. They sang and danced before the Sultan to return the icon, and he gave it back which upset his daughter. To console the daughter, the Sultan sent in his army again to bring it back, but this time they were not successful. According to other versions, the Muslim daughter followed the icon from Delhi to Srirangam on a horse and still not seeing the idol, gave up her life before the door of the sanctum, symbolizing that love brought back the icon after the war had taken it away.

An 1870 photo of the gopurams in the temple town.

Beyond these legends, there was a more severe second invasion of South India including Srirangam between 1323 CE and 1327 CE by the armies of the Sultanate under Muhammad bin Tughluq. The sanctum's Vishnu image with its jewelry was pre-emptively removed by the Hindus before the Delhi Sultanate troops reached Srirangam by a group led by the Vaishnavite Acharaya Pillai Lokacharyar to Tirunelveli in Tamil Nadu. The goddess Ranganayaki (Lakshmi) was also taken away to another location by a separate group. The temple was defended and according to the Tamil tradition some 13,000 Sri Vaishnavas devotees of Srirangam, died in the fierce battle.

After nearly six decades when Madurai Sultanate ruled after the Pandyan rulers were ousted after the repeated Delhi Sultanate's invasions, the Vijayanagara Empire ousted the Madurai Sultanate in 1378. Thereafter, the image of Namberumal was brought back to Srirangam. Before then, for decades the deity and the priestly wardens wandered and secretly carried the temple's icon through villages of Tamil Nadu, Kerala and Karnataka. They finally went to the hills of Tirumala Tirupati, where they remained until the temple was rebuilt in 1371. The icon was consecrated again according to the legends. This time, in memory of the first Sultan's daughter which tradition calls Thulukha Nachiyar, a niche in the temple was built for her. The niche shows her as a girl sitting on a horse that carried her to Delhi. Her legend is still remembered. During contemporary processions when the icon is taken out of sanctum and then returned to it after its journey, Thulukha Nachiyar is dressed in Muslim garments and food offerings are made to her in the form of butter and chappathis (wheat bread).

Thereafter, under the Vijayanagara Empire, the temple site saw over 200 years of stability, repairs, first round of fortifications, and addition of mandapas. The Vishnu and Lakshmi images were reinstalled and the site became a Hindu temple again in 1371 CE under Kumara Kampana, a Vijayanagara commander and the son of Bukka I. In the last decade of the 14th century, a pillared antechamber was gifted by the Vijayanagara rulers. In the 15th century, they coated the apsidal roofs with solid gold sheets, followed by financing the addition of a series of new shrines, mandapas and gopuras to the temple, according to George Michell.

After the destruction of the Vijayanagara in the late 16th century, geo-political instability returned. The site became the focus of bitter wars between the Hindu Nayakas and the Muslim Mughals in the 17th century. The Nayakas fortified the temple town and the seven prakaras. It was taken over by Muslim Nawabs of Arcot as a lucrative source of revenues, and thereafter attracted a contest between the French and British military powers. Srirangam temple site and the neighboring city of Tiruchirappalli (Trichy) became an intense center of Christian and Muslim missionary activity during the 18th and 19th centuries. With the establishment of the Madras Presidency within the British Empire, geo-political stability returned and the Ranganathaswamy Temple site attracted interest in archeological and historical studies.

=== Sri Vaishnavism ===
The epigraphical evidence suggests that these Hindu dynasties — Cholas, Pandyas, Hoysalas, Gajapatis, Nayaks, Vijayanagara – assisted with rebuilding, renovation and supported the traditional customs. Some mention substantial gifts to the temple. A Chola king, for example, presented the temple with a golden serpent couch. Some historians identify this king with Rajamahendra Chola. The temple has witnessed and played a key role in the early Sri Vaishnavism history, particularly the centuries that followed the major Hindu philosopher Ramanuja (1017–1137 CE), and his predecessors Nathamuni and Yamunacharya. It witnessed the debate between the Dvaita (dualistic) and Advaita (non-dualistic) sub-traditions within Vaishnavism. Centuries later, it was a key site in the debate and disagreements between the northern Tamil and southern Tamil traditions, also called as the Vadakalai and Tenkalai. The early rulers such as the Pallavas, Cholas and Pandyas supported it as a hub of the Bhakti movement with a devotional singing and dance tradition, but this tradition stopped during the 14th century and was revived in a limited way much later.

== Architecture ==
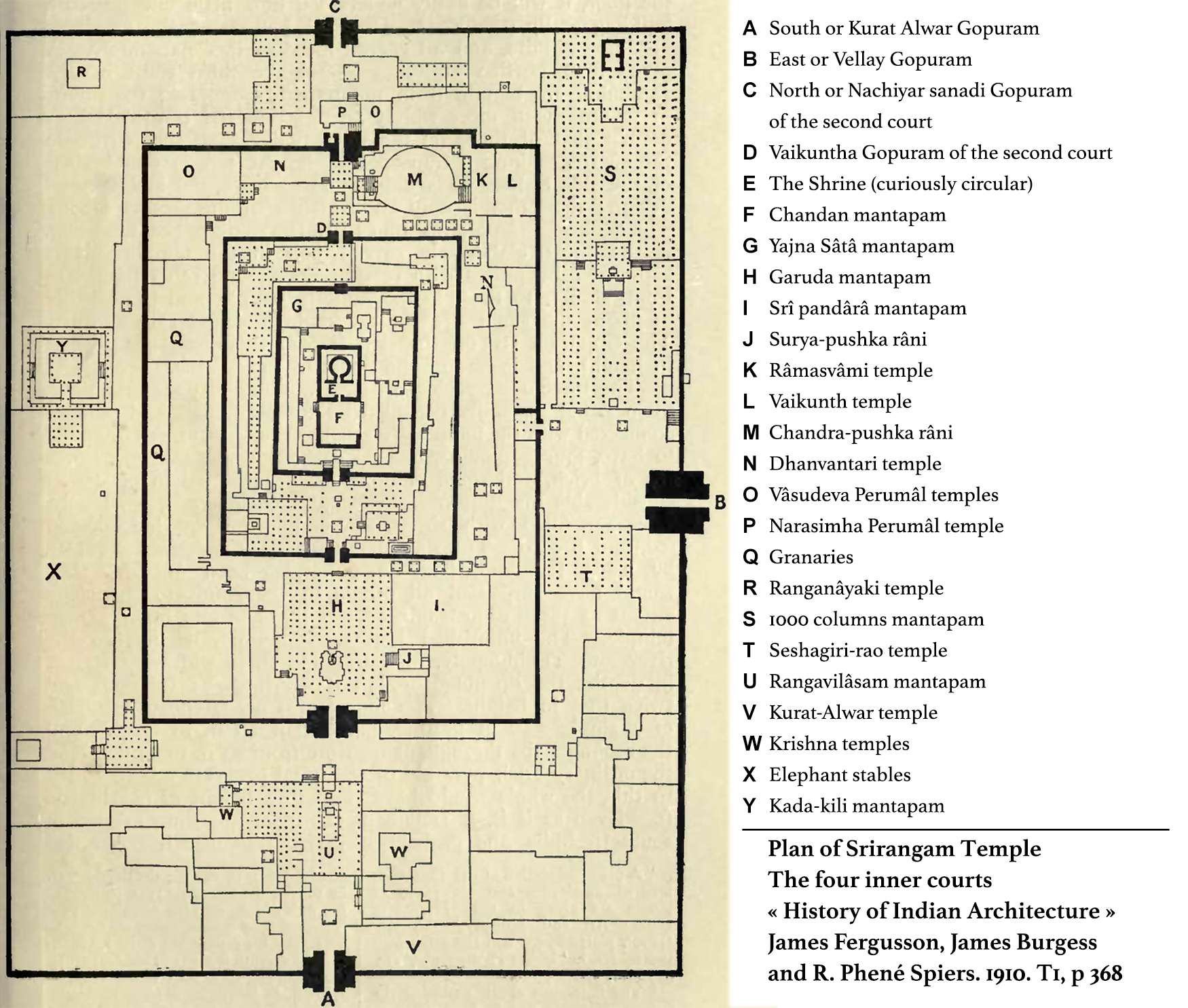
Plan of four inner courts of the Srirangam Temple (Burgess, 1910)

The temple is enclosed by seven concentric enclosures with courtyards (termed prakarams or mathil suvar). Each layer has walls and gopurams, which were built or fortified in and after the 16th century. These walls total 32,592 feet (9,934 m) or over six miles. The temple has 17 major gopurams (towers, 21 total), (Note: The gopurams, when present, are found in the middle of each side of all seven courtyards allowing the pilgrims and visitors to enter from any of the four directions. In some cases, the geographical constraints did not permit the addition of a gateway and it is here that the courtyard may have less than four entrances. The gateways are taller on the outer courtyards, with the largest found on the south side of the outermost courtyard.) 39 pavilions, 50 shrines, nine sacred water pools, Ayiram kaal mandapam (a hall of 1000 pillars) and several small water bodies inside.

The temple is aligned to the north–south and east–west axis, on an island surrounded by the Kaveri River. The river has long been considered sacred, and called the Daksina Ganga or the "Ganges of the South". The outer two prakarams (outer courtyard) are residential and markets with shops, restaurants and flower stalls. The five inner courtyards have shrines to Vishnu and his various avatars such as Rama and Krishna. Major shrines are additionally dedicated to goddess Lakshmi and many saints of Vaishnavism. In particular, these shrines celebrate and commemorate the Tamil poet-saints and philosophers called the Alvars, as well Hindu philosophers such as Ramanuja, Vedanta Desika, and Manavala Mamunigal of Sri Vaishnavism tradition.

Despite the construction of various mandapas and gopuras over a span of many centuries, the architecture of the Ranganathaswamy temple is one of the better illustrations of Hindu temple planometric geometry per agama design texts in the Tamil tradition. According to George Michell, a professor and art historian on Indian architecture, the regulating geometry and plan of Srirangam site takes on "a ritual dimension since all the architectural components, especially the focal gopuras and the most important colonnades and mandapas, are arranged along the axes dictated by the cardinal directions". This alignment integrates the routes that devotees follow as they journey into the innermost sanctum.

=== Shrines ===
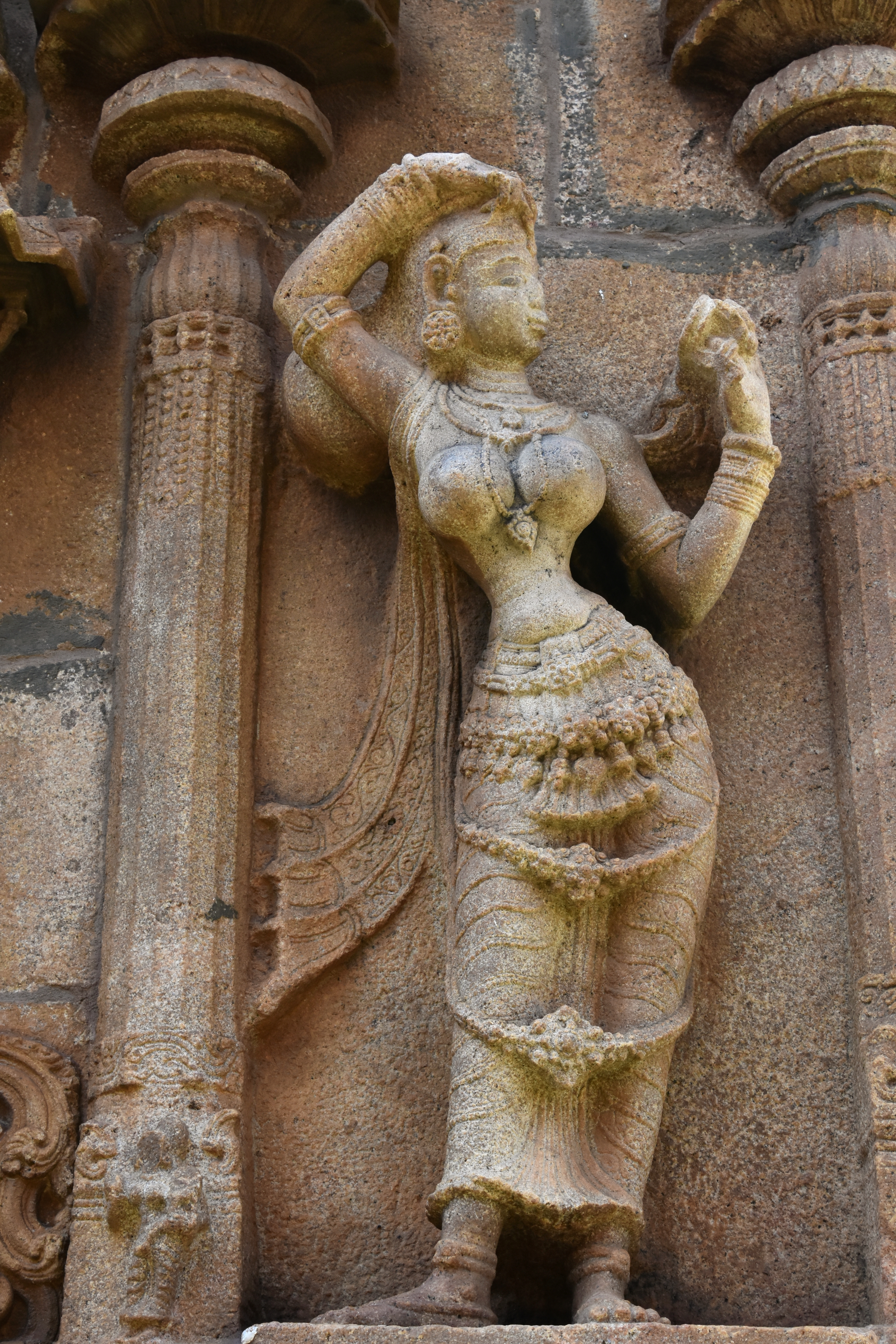
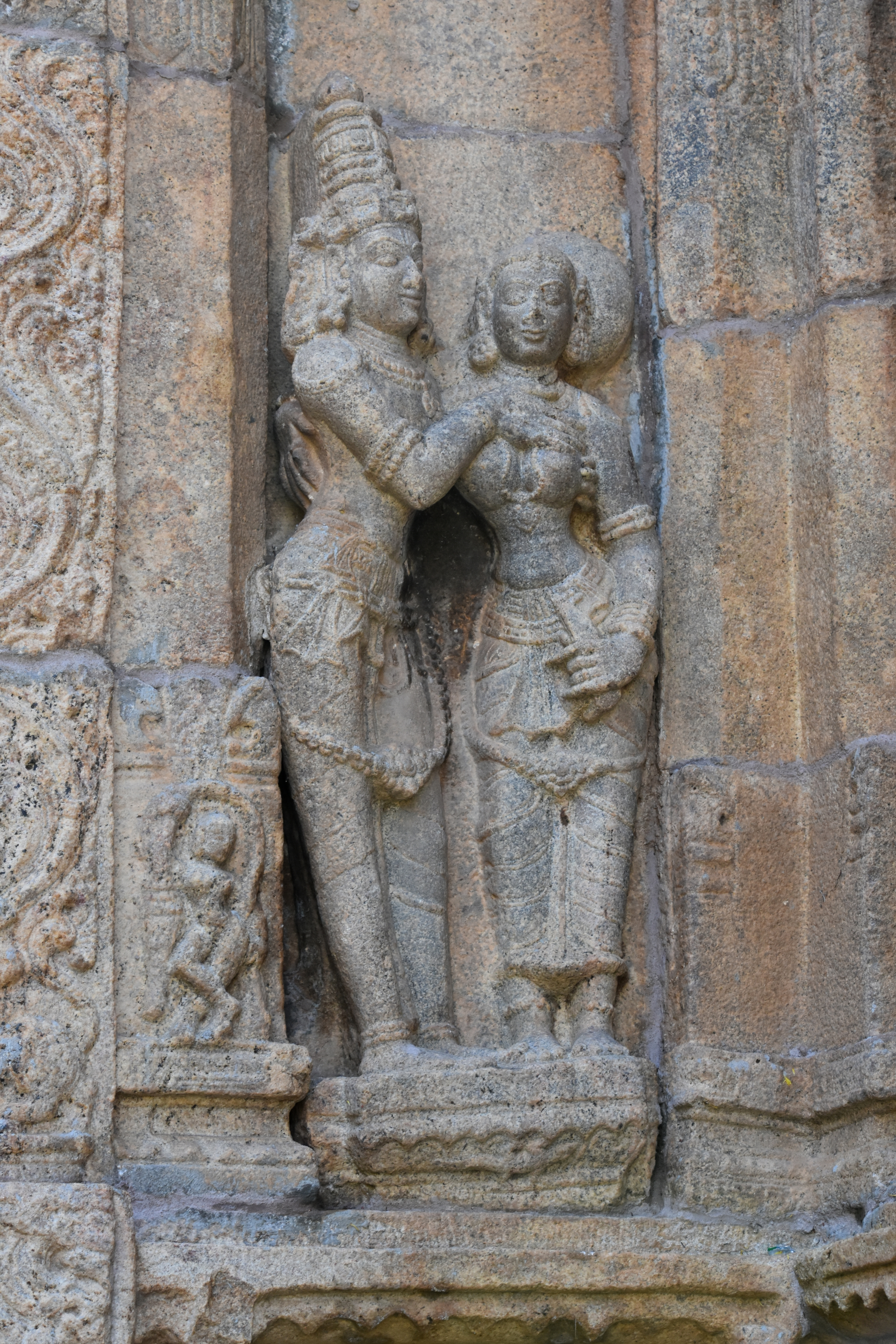
Sculpture in the Venugopala shrine.

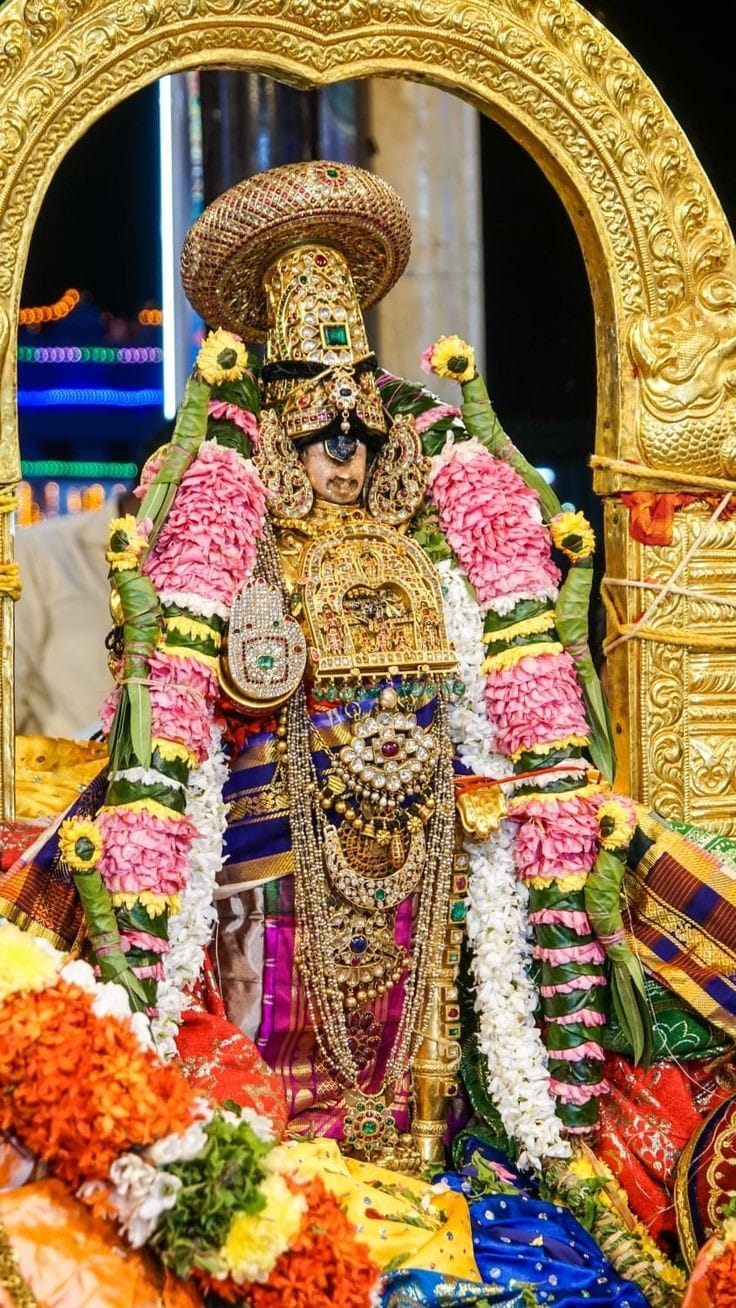
Utsava murti (Processional idol) of Sri Ranganathaswami during the Vaikuntha Ekadashi festival.

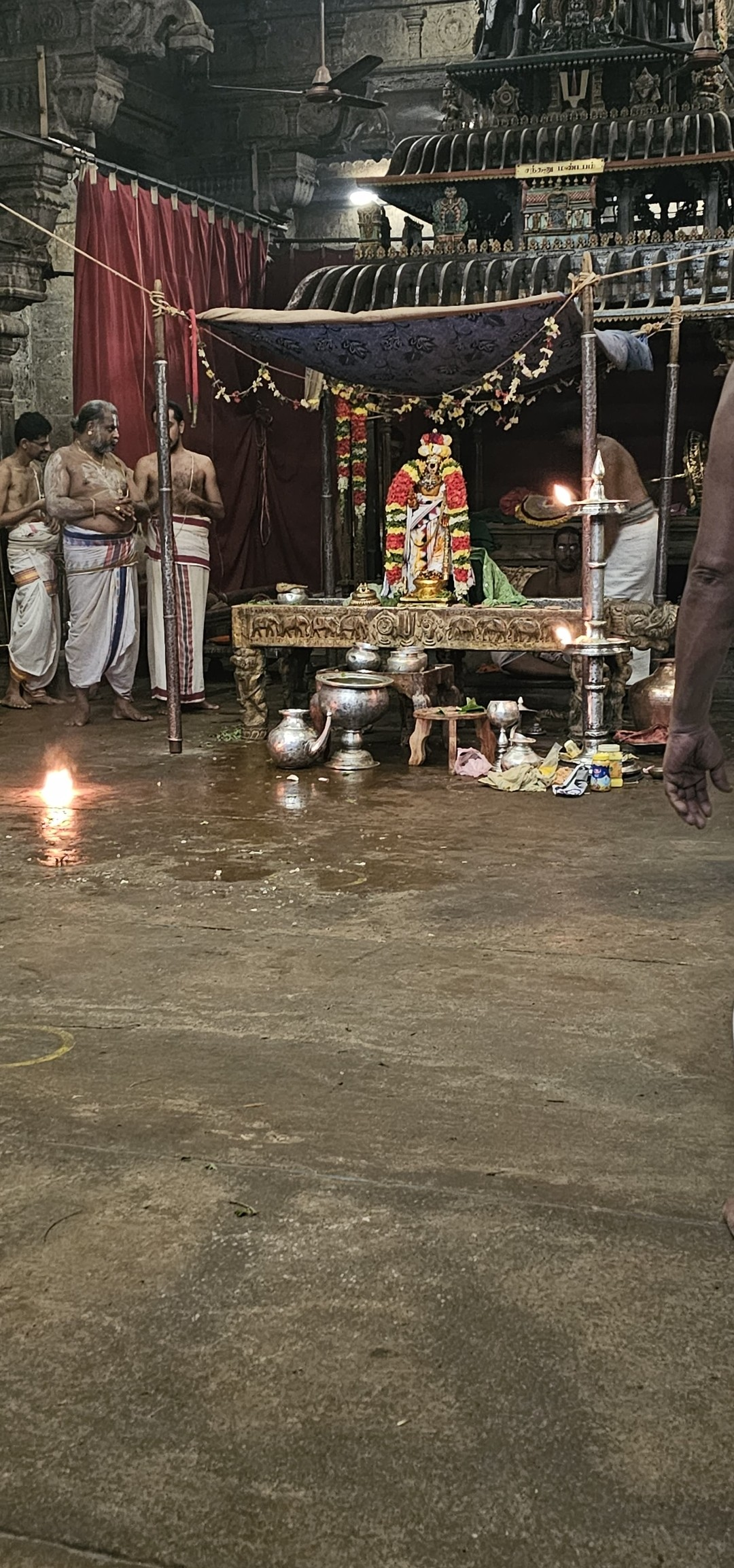
The Utsav Murti of Srirangam Temple during a new moon day ritual

The Venugopala-Krishna shrine, one of the most elaborately carved, is in the south-west corner of the fourth enclosure of the temple was rebuilt by Chokkanatha Nayak, according to an inscription dated 1674.

The main shrine for Ranganatha is in the innermost enclosure (Dharmavarma prakara). The sanctum has a golden vimanam (crown tower over the sanctum sanctorum). It is shaped like the Tamil omkara (om symbol), and has a carving of Vishnu as Paravasudeva (the most ancient form of Vishnu) on its gable, has an etching of Rama and Krishna on it, and is plated with gold. Inside, a 6-metre (20 ft) edifice of Ranganatha reclining on Adishesha, the coiled serpent, can be seen. (Note: The reclining form of Vishnu has widespread popularity in India and southeast Asia, but is known by other names such as Ananta or Anantaseshayi or Anantashayana Vishnu.) The main idol is not made of black granite stone, but is made of Sudhai, an organic combination of lime, mortar and shaligram stones. The idol is coated by Thailam (oil made of honey, jaggery, sandalwood and tree resins), giving it the appearance of polished black stone. Adishesha has five hoods and is coiled into three and a half rounds. Vishnu's head rests on a small cylindrical pillow, and his right palm, which faces upwards, rests next to his head. A pendant containing Lakshmi's image is placed on Ranganatha's chest. Ranganatha's crown, eyes, hands and feet are plated with gold. Neither Sridevi (goddess Lakshmi) nor Bhudevi (goddess Earth) are depicted near his feet, as is found in late medieval era paintings. The sanctum does not show Brahma coming out of or connected to his navel either.

The sanctum can be entered through the south gateway, on which the reclining Vishnu is facing. The doorway as one enters from the mukhamandapam, also called the Gayatri mantapa, is flanked by Jaya and Vijaya, the guardians of Vaikuntha. The sanctum chamber is round, even though the vimana above is an oval projection. The circumambulation path (pradakshina-patha) is set in a square, to journey clockwise. This garbha-griha is surrounded by a raised square Tiruvunnali, encircling pillars and another inner square. As the visitor completes the circumambulation around the resting Vishnu, one sees four additional images. On the western wall inside the core sanctum is Ganesha (son of Shiva and Parvati), on the northwestern corner is Yoga-Ananta (Vishnu seated in yoga asana on Sesha), on the northeastern side is Yoga-Narasimha (Narasimha seated in yoga asana), and on the eastern wall is Durga (an aspect of Parvati), considered to be Vishnu's sister.

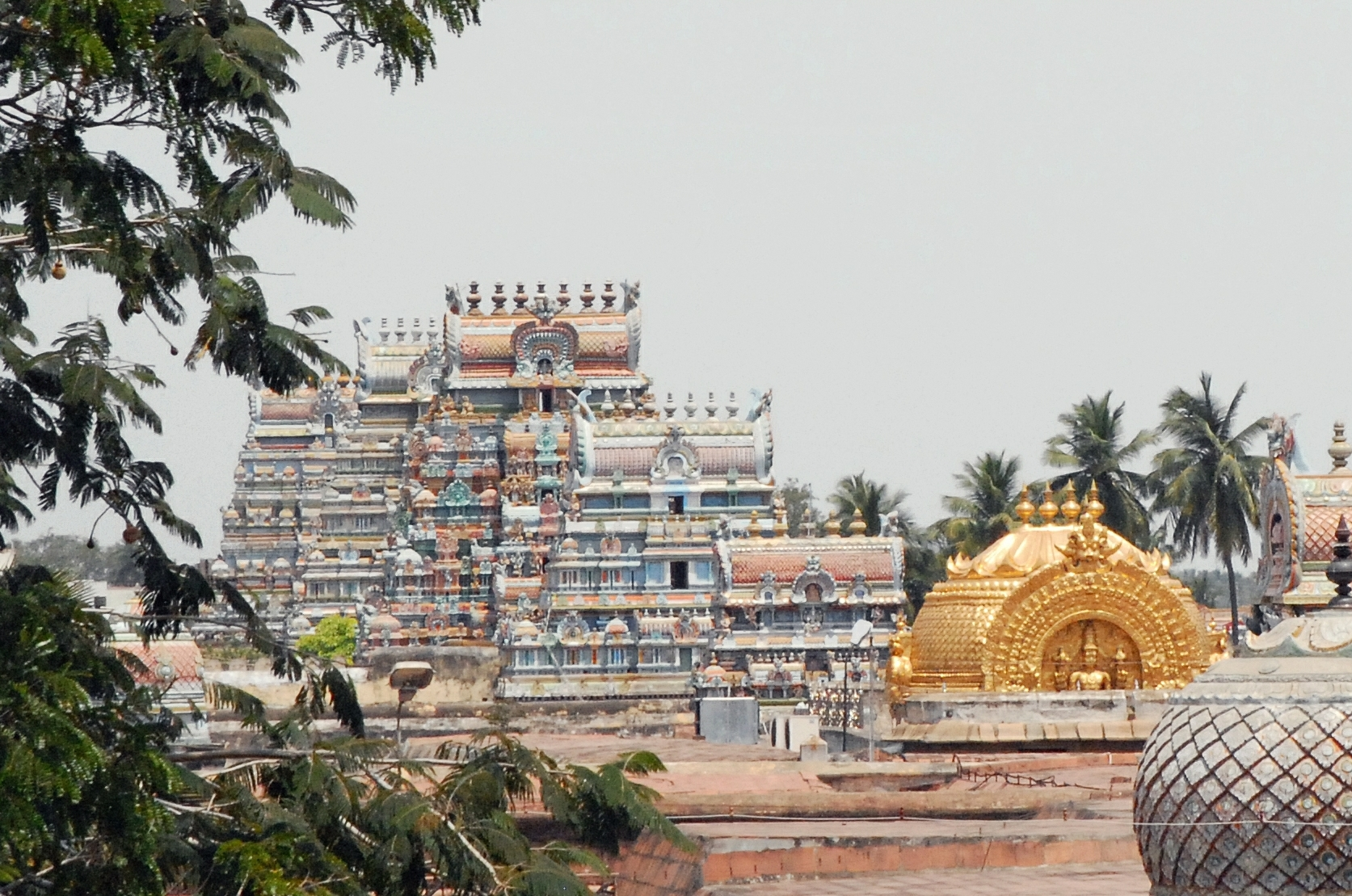
The golden Vimana over the sanctum at Srirangam midst its gopurams, its gable with Paravasudeva carving.

The exterior of the vimana and attached mandapam (hall) have intricately carved pilasters with fluted shafts, double capitals, and pendant lotus brackets. Sculptures are placed in the niches of three sides of the sanctuary walls; maidens enhance the walls in between. The elevation is punctuated with a secondary set of pilasters that support shallow eaves at different levels to cap larger and smaller recesses. The sanctuary is crowned in the traditional fashion with a hemispherical roof. The double-curved eaves of the entrance porch on the east side are concealed in a later columned hall. Dhanvantari, a great physician of the Hindu mythos is considered to be an avatar of Vishnu – there is a separate shrine of Dhanvantari within the temple.

=== Mandapams (Halls) ===
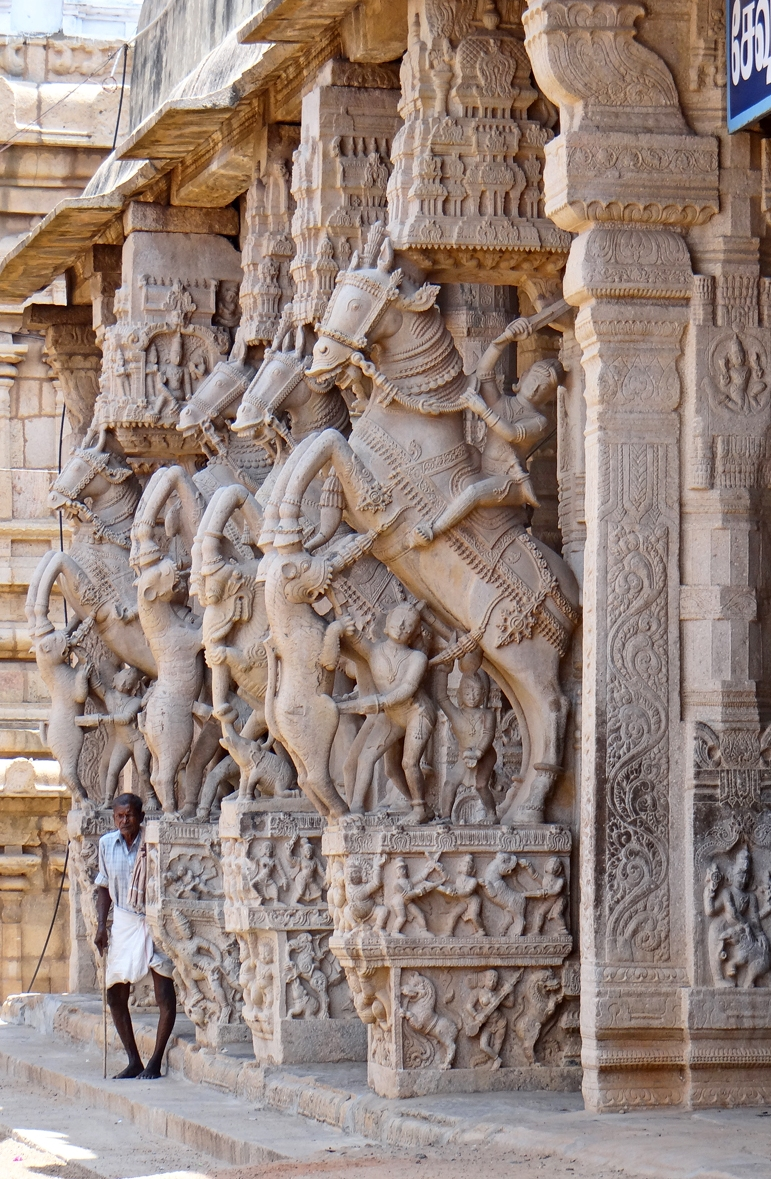
Sesharayar mandapam artwork

The Ranganathaswamy Temple has many mandapams:

- Thousand pillar mandapam is a theatre-like structure made from granite. It was built during the Vijayanagara rule period. It has a central wide aisle with seven side aisles on each side, with pillars set in a square pattern.
- Sesharaya mandapam is the intricately carved hall built during the Nayaka rule period. It is found on the east side of the fourth prakaram courtyard. The northern side of this community hall has 40 leaping animals with riders on their back, all carved out of monolithic pillars.
- Garuda Mandapam is named after the vahana (vehicle) of Vishnu, named Garuda. It is on the south side of the third prakaram courtyard. It too is dated to the Nayak rule era. Inside the community hall, on its pillars, are portrait sculptures. In the middle is a free-standing seated tall Garuda figure, identifiable by his eagle-head, wings and his facing the Vishnu shrine.
- Kili mandapam is found inside the innermost (first) prakaram courtyard. It is next to the Ranganatha sanctum. Here, walking elephant balustrades line the steps that lead into the gathering hall. This is dated to the 17th-century Hindu rulers. The hall and structural elements are carved with animals, and in its centre is a raised square platform with four carved pillars.
- Ranga Vilasa mandapam is one of the larger community halls designed for large spaces between the pillars for the pilgrim groups and families to sit together and rest. It is covered with Hindu mythology murals and narratives from the Ramayana.

The Hall of 1000 pillars is a fine example of a planned theatre-like structure, and opposite to it is the "Sesha Mandap". The 1000-pillared hall made of granite was constructed in the Vijayanagara period (1336–1565) on the site of the old temple. The most artistic halls that the Nayaks added to the complex are the Sesha Mandap on the east side of the fourth enclosure. The hall is celebrated for the leaping animals carved onto the piers at its northern end. The pillars consists of sculptures of wildly rearing horses bearing riders on their backs and trampling with their hoofs upon the heads of rampant tigers, seem only natural and congruous among such weird surroundings. The great hall is traversed by one wide aisle in the centre for the whole of its greater length, and intersected by transepts of like dimension running across at right angles. There remain seven side aisles on each side, in which all the pillars are equally spaced out. The Garuda Mandapa (hall of the legendary bird deity of Vishnu, Garuda) located on the south side of the third enclosure is another Nayak addition. Courtly portrait sculptures, reused from an earlier structure, are fixed to the piers lining the central aisle. A free-standing shrine inside the hall contains a large seated figure of Garuda; the eagle-headed god faces north towards the principal sanctum. The Kili mandapa (Hall of parrots) is located next to the Ranganatha shrine, in the first enclosure of the temple. Elephant balustrades skirt the access steps that ascend to a spacious open area. This is bounded by decorated piers with rearing animals and attached colonettes in the finest 17th-century manner. Four columns in the middle define a raised dais; their shafts are embellished with undulating stalks.

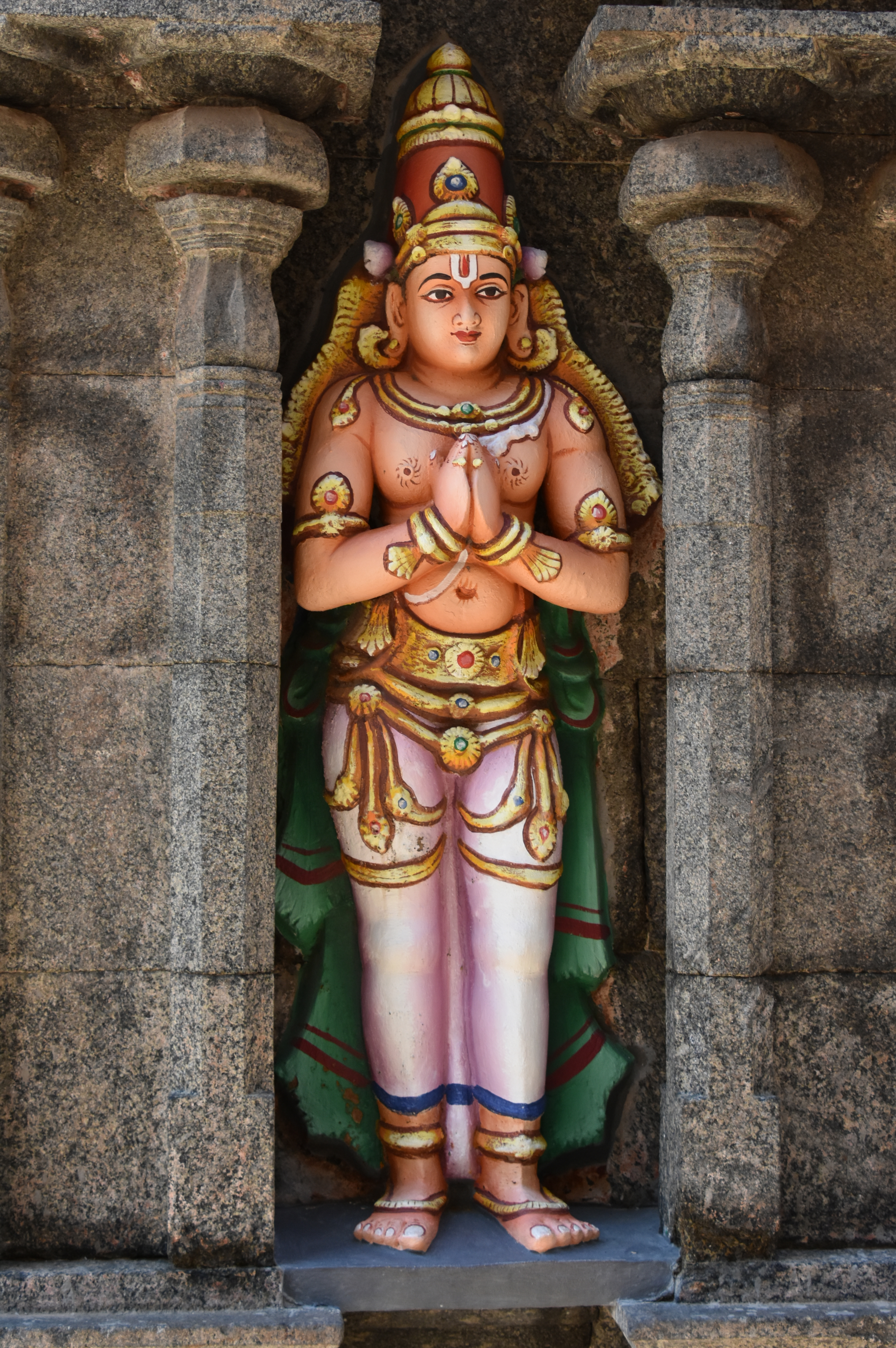
A Vaishnava devotee in namaste posture

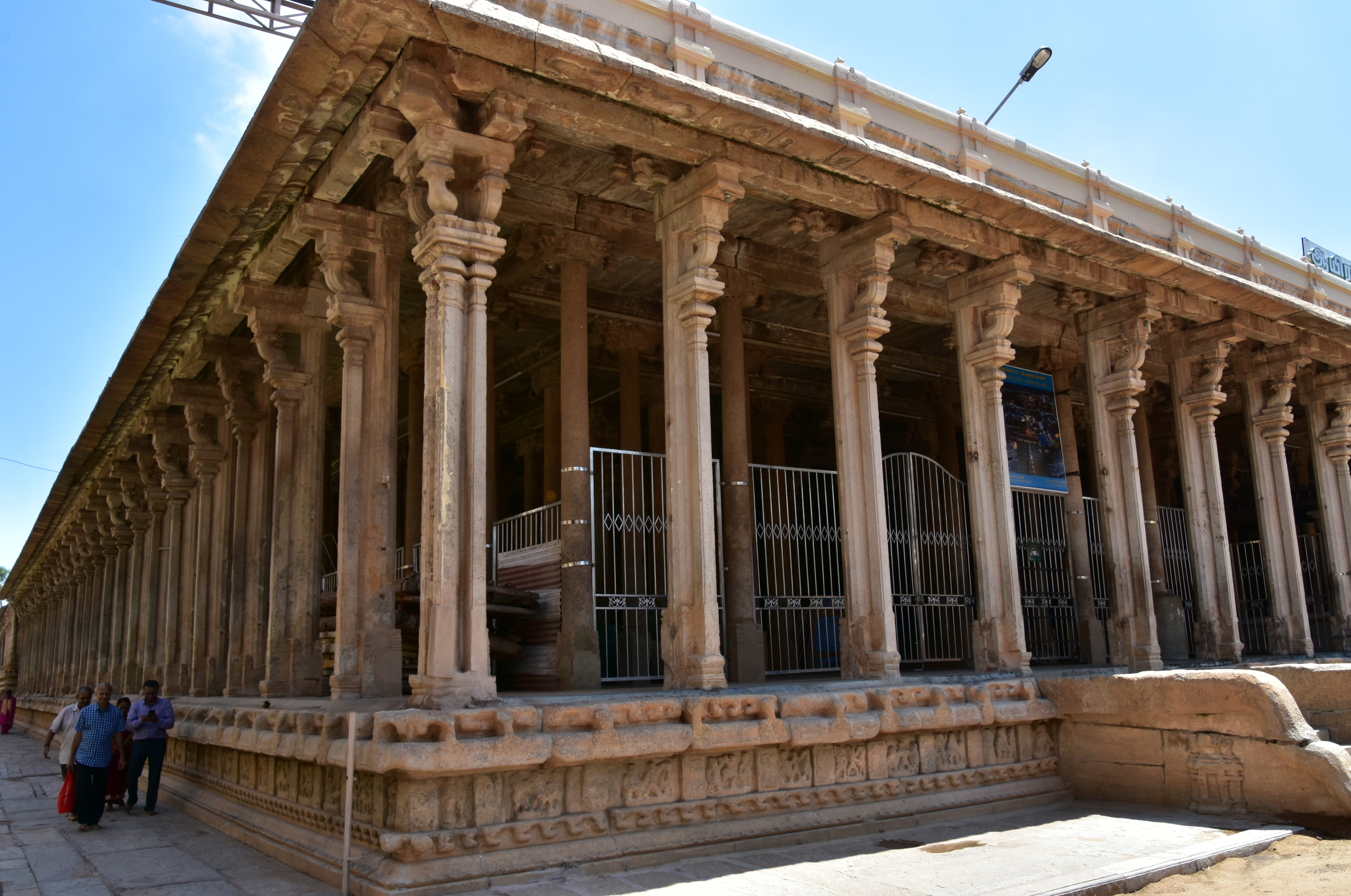
Thousand pillar hall

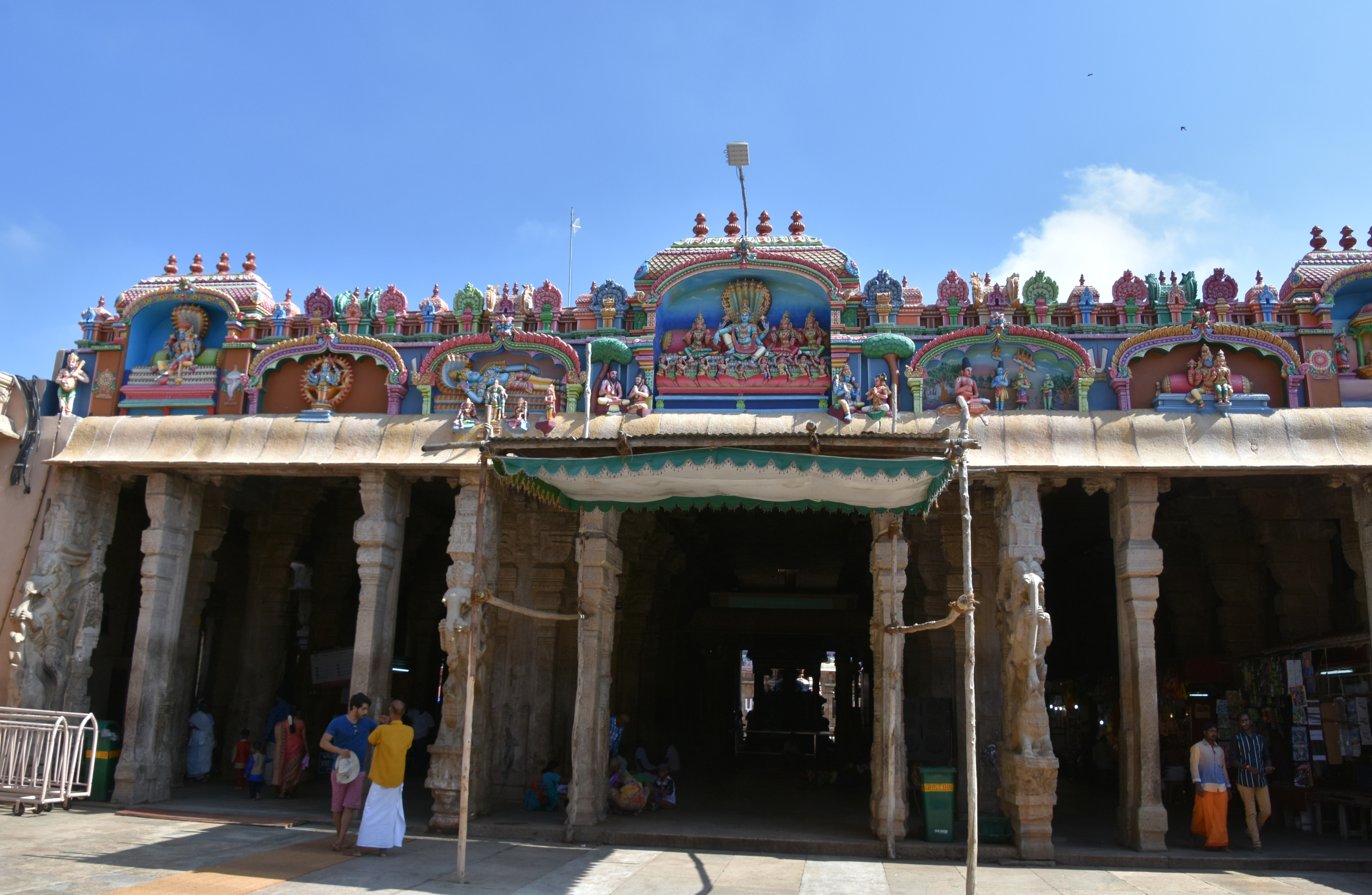
A mandapa

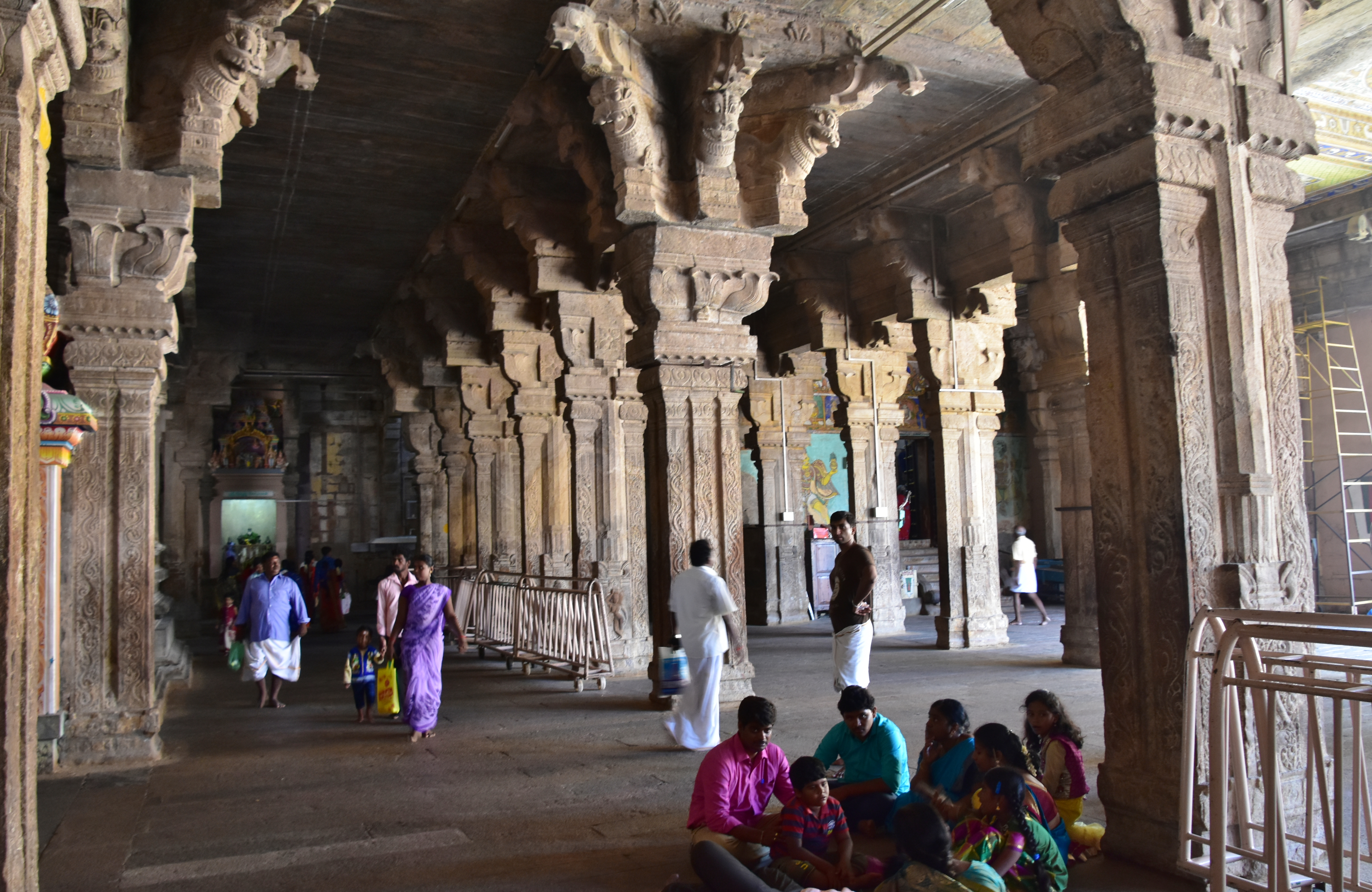
Garuda mandapa

=== Gopurams ===
There are 21 gopurams (tower gateways), among which the towering Rajagopuram (shrine of the main gateway) is the second tallest gopuram in the world, at 73 metres (240 ft). The 13-tiered Rajagopuram had a base constructed around 1500 CE and was later completed in 1987 by Ahobhila Matha, a historic Sri Vaishnava Hindu monastery. This tower dominates the landscape for miles around, while the remaining 20 gopurams were built between the 12th and early 17th centuries. The gopurams have pronounced projections in the middle of the long sides, generally with openings on each of the successive levels. The Vellai gopuram (white tower) on the east side of the fourth enclosure has a steep pyramidal superstructure that reaches a height of almost 44 metres (144 ft). The structure of the Rajagopuram remained incomplete for over 400 years. Started during the reign of Achyuta Deva Raya of Vijayanagara Empire, the construction stopped after the fall of Vijayanagara in the late 16th century and wars thereafter. The Rajagopuram (the main gopuram) did not reach its current height of 73 metres (240 ft) until 1987, when the 44th Jiyar (acharya, chief counsellor) of Ahobila Matha began collecting donations to complete it. The whole structure was constructed in a span of eight years. The Rajagopuram was consecrated on 25 March 1987. The length and breadth at the base of the Rajagopuram is 50.6 and 29.6 metres (166 and 97 ft), while the length and breadth at the top is 29.9 and 9.8 metres (98 and 32 ft). The 13 glistening copper 'kalasams' atop the tower weigh 135 kg (298 lb) each, are 3.12 m (10 ft 3 in) high with a 1.56 m (5 ft 1 in) diameter vessel. All the Gopurams were repaired and repainted during the Mahasamprokshanam which occurred in 2015 after 28 years.

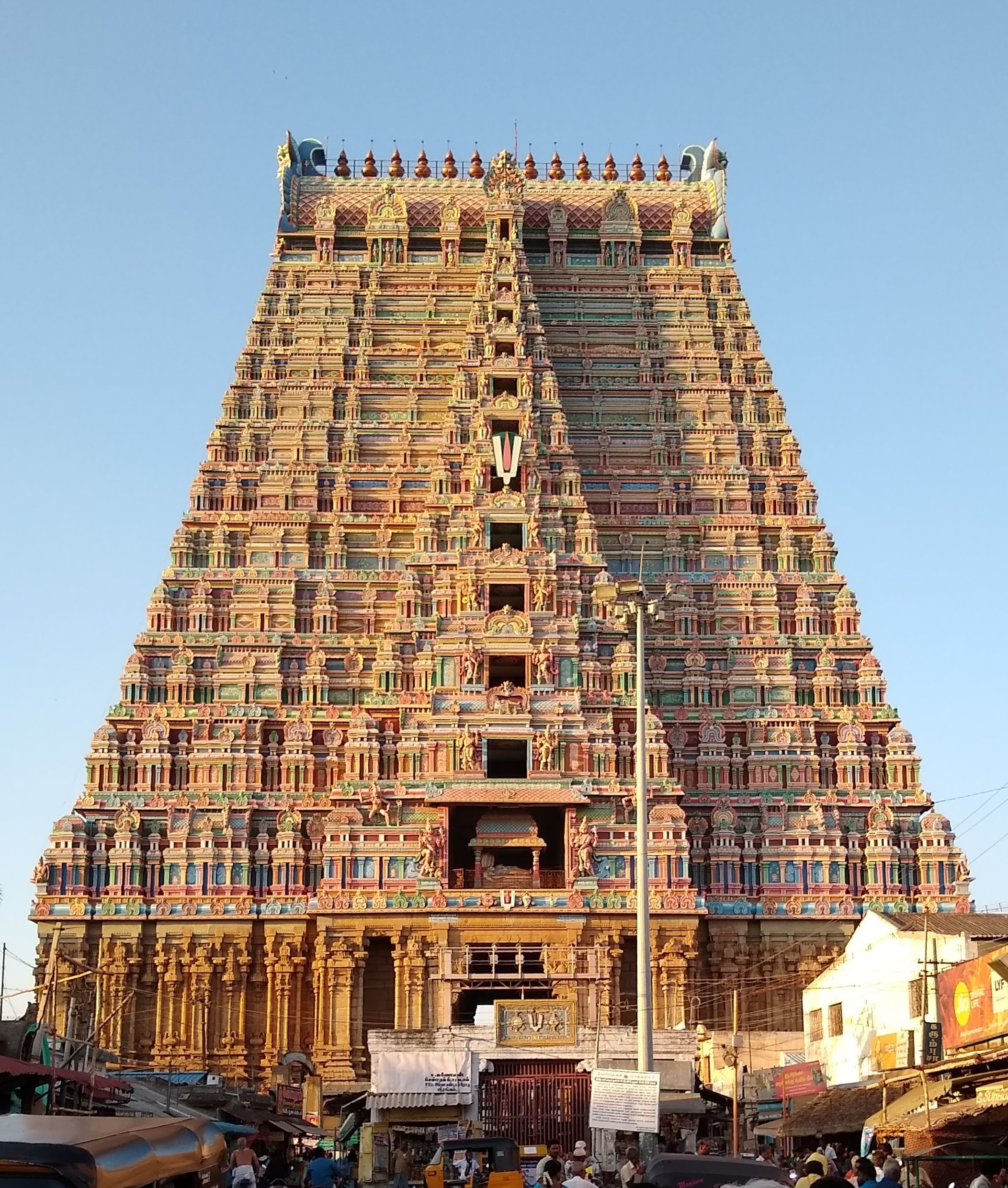
The 13-storey gopura (the Rajagopuram) is the main gopura on the street leading to the temple.

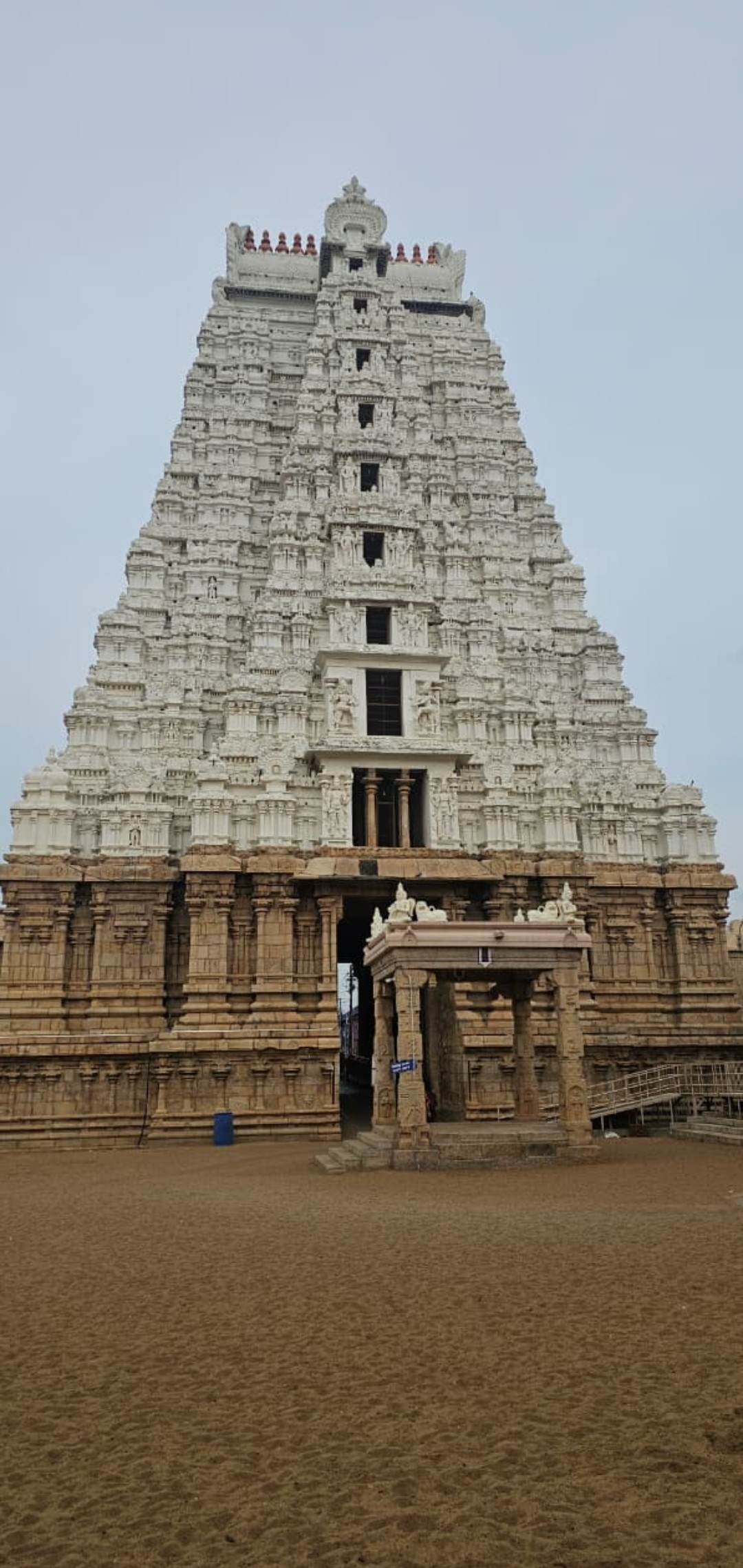
A 9-storey gopura commonly known as Vellai Gopuram, named after the temple dancer Vellayi, who was martyred during the Muslim invasion.

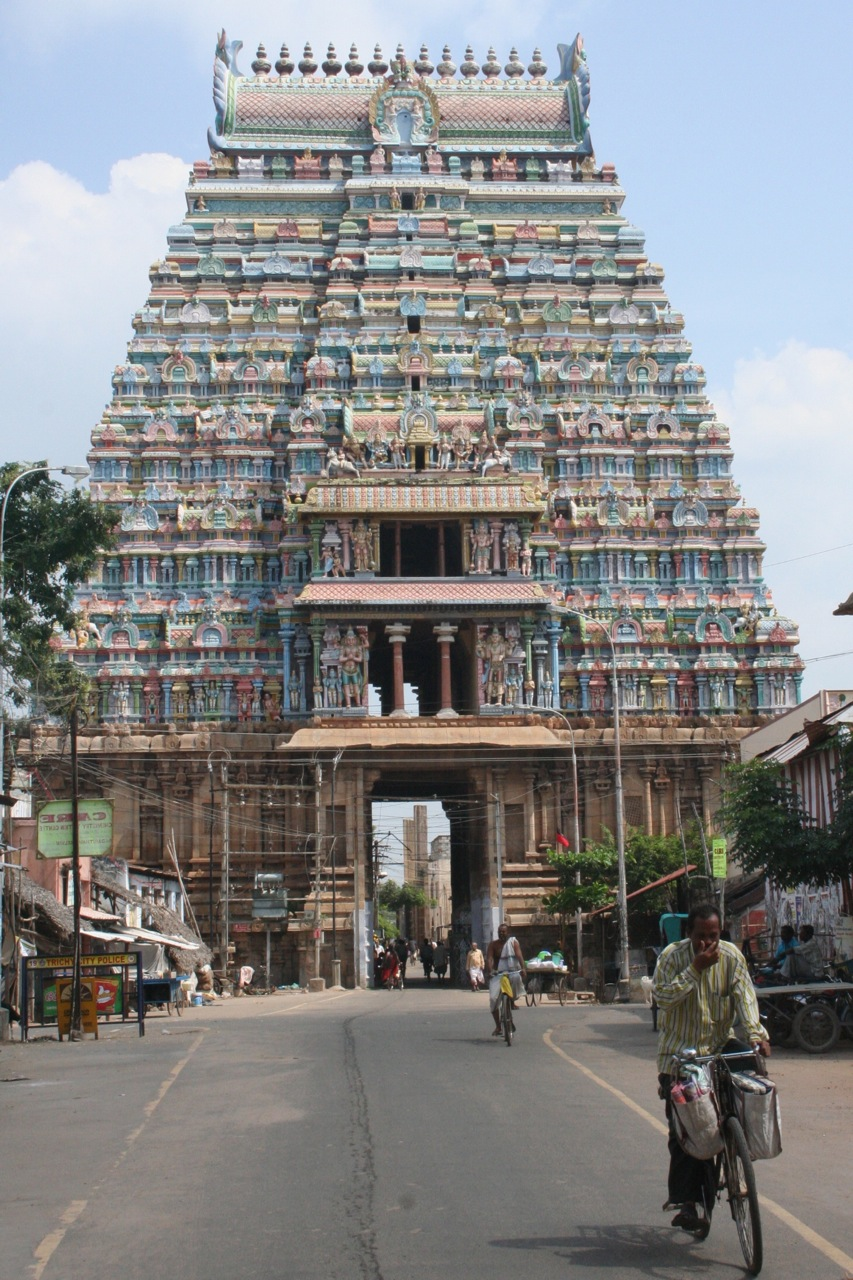
An 8-storey gopura built by the Vijayanagara Empire.

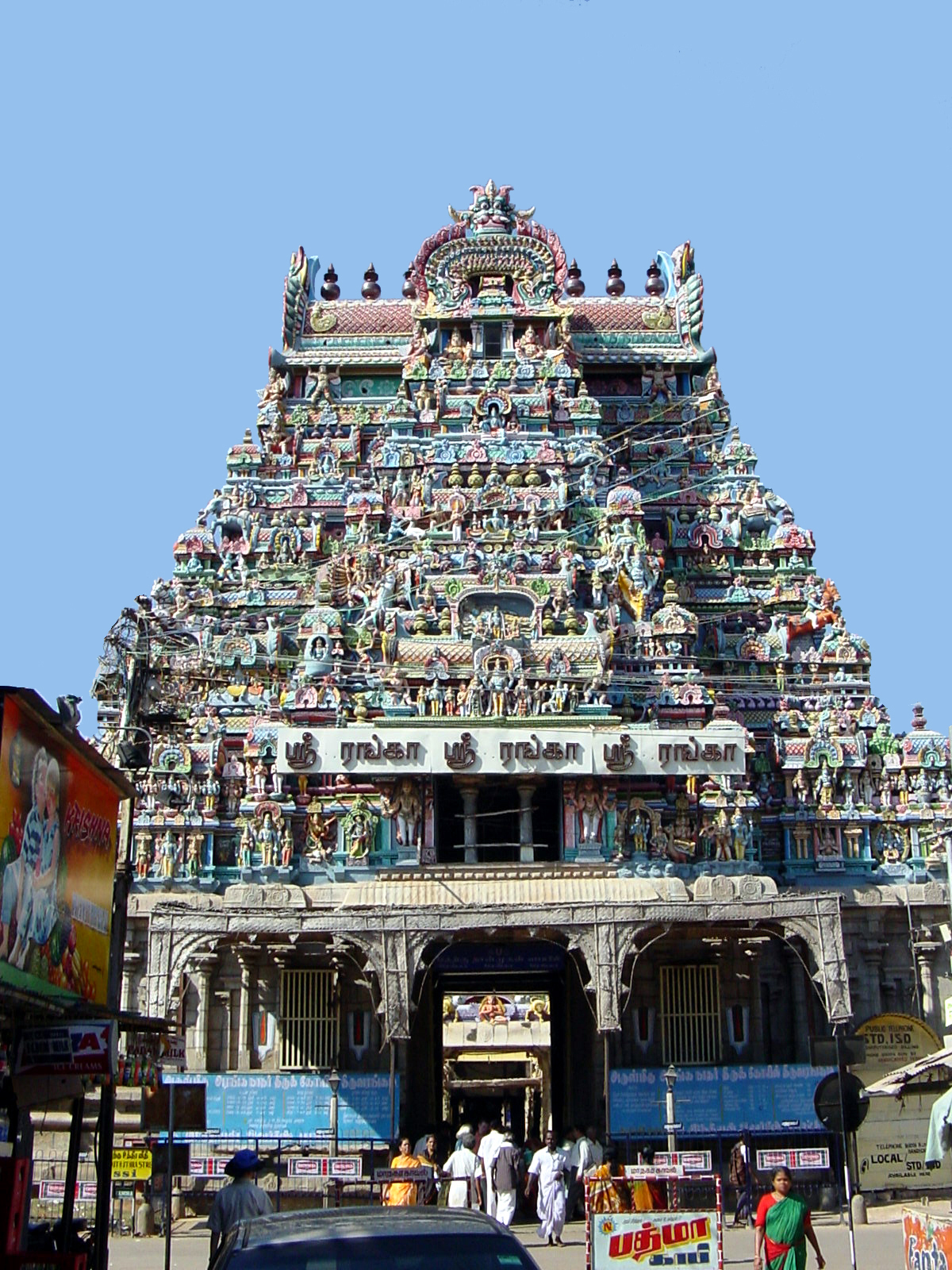
The 7-storeyed Ranga Ranga Gopuram

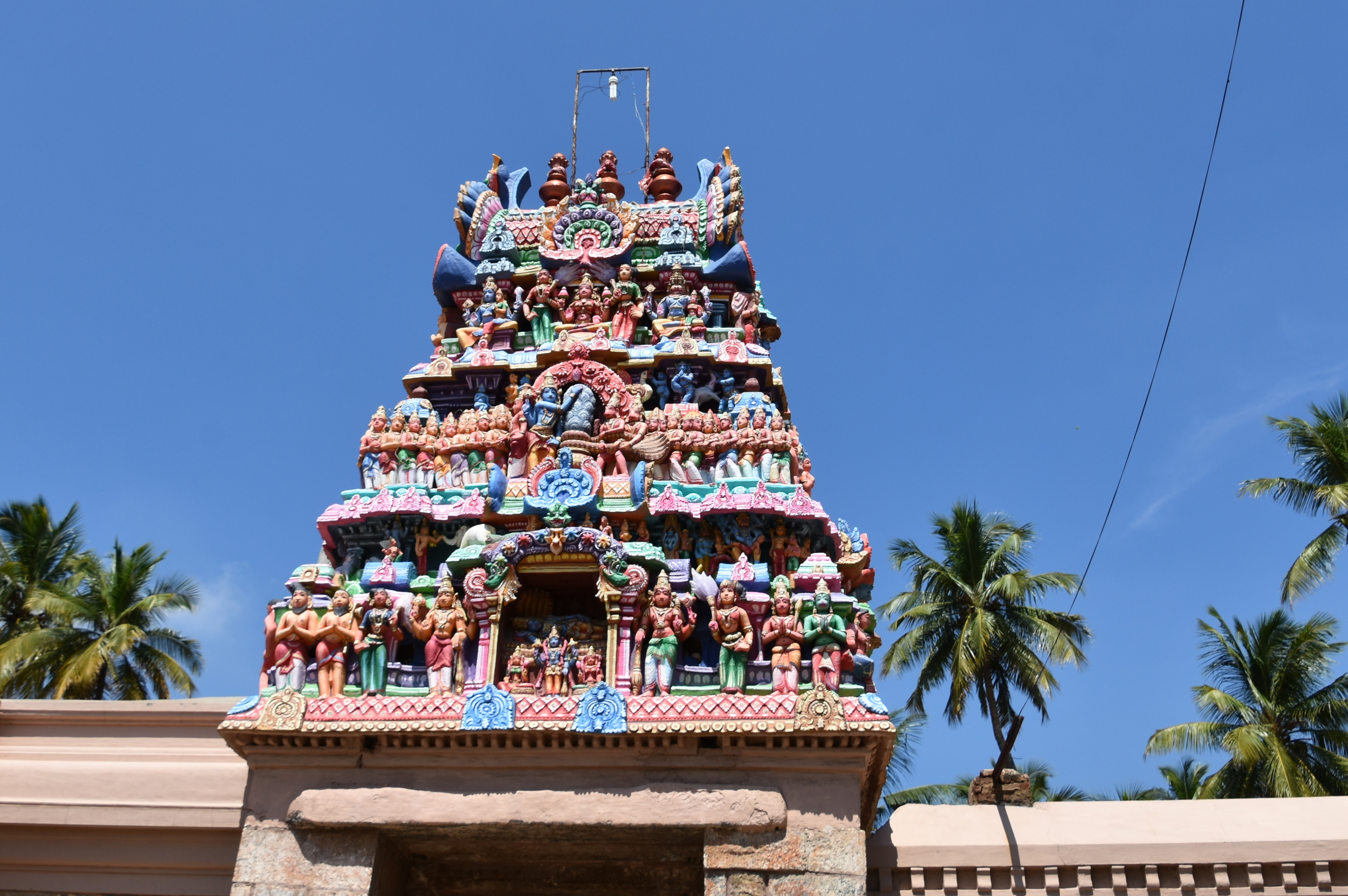
A 3-storey gopura

=== Inscriptions and frescoes ===
The Ranganathaswamy Temple town has over 800 inscriptions, of which nearly 640 are on temple walls and monuments. Many of these relate to gifts and grants by rulers or the elite, while others relate to the temple's management, scholars, dedication and general operation. The inscriptions have been a source of information about South Indian history, culture, economy and social role. These range from the late 9th century to the rule of Aditya Chola I, to the last historical ones from the 16th century. Others are from the times of Cholas, Nayakas, Pandyas, Hoysalas and the Vijayanagara era.

The historic inscriptions at the Ranganathaswamy Temple are in six major Indian languages: Tamil, Sanskrit, Kannada, Telugu, Marathi and Odia. Many of the inscriptions are in Grantha characters.

The temple has a lot of inscriptions of Kulottunga I. One interesting epigraph is a Kannada record that states that an entourage led by the Kannada-sandhivigrahi (foreign affairs minister) of Chalukya Tribhuvanamalla (Vikramaditya VI) made some donations to the temple. The inscription is dated in the 29th year of the reign of Kulottunga I.

The temple has inscriptions of the Suryavamshi Gajapatis of Odisha as well. In one inscription, it is mentioned that Hamvira Deva Mahapatra, son of the legendary Kapilendra Deva Gajapati, made donations to the temple after he aggressively marched upon the Vijayanagara Empire up to Tiruchirapally and then Rameswaram. This inscription is in Tamil.

Some of the mandapam and corridors of the Temple complex have frescoes, of which some have faded. These narrate Hindu legends and mythologies, or scenes relating to Vaishnava scholars.

=== Granaries, tanks, and other monuments ===
The Ranganathaswamy Temple complex includes huge medieval era Kottarams or granaries. These provided food reserves and security to the temple town and supplies to its kitchen serving the needy travelers, pilgrims and local population. The temple has many other structures, participating and supporting various aspects of social life. Some mandapams and temple compounds were devoted to education, both religious and secular such as of musicians and dancers. The temple inscriptions state that its premises had an arokyashala (hospital) for those needing medical care. Several 11th and 12th century inscriptions describe a gift of land to support recitation of Hindu texts in the temple and for feeding Sri Vaishnavas.

The temple has twelve major water tanks. Of these, the Surya Pushkarini (sun pool) and Chandra Pushkarani (moon pool) are two of the largest that harvest most of rainwater. They have a combined capacity of two million liters of water.

The temple has wooden monuments that is regularly maintained and used for festive processions. These have intricate carvings of Hindu legends, and some are plated with silver or gold foils. The most significant of the temple chariots are the Garuda vahana, the Simha vahana, the Aanai vahana, the Kudirai vahana, the Hanuman vahana, the Yazhi vahana, the Shesha vahana, the Annapakshi vahana, the Otrai vahana and the Prabhai vahana.

== Significance ==
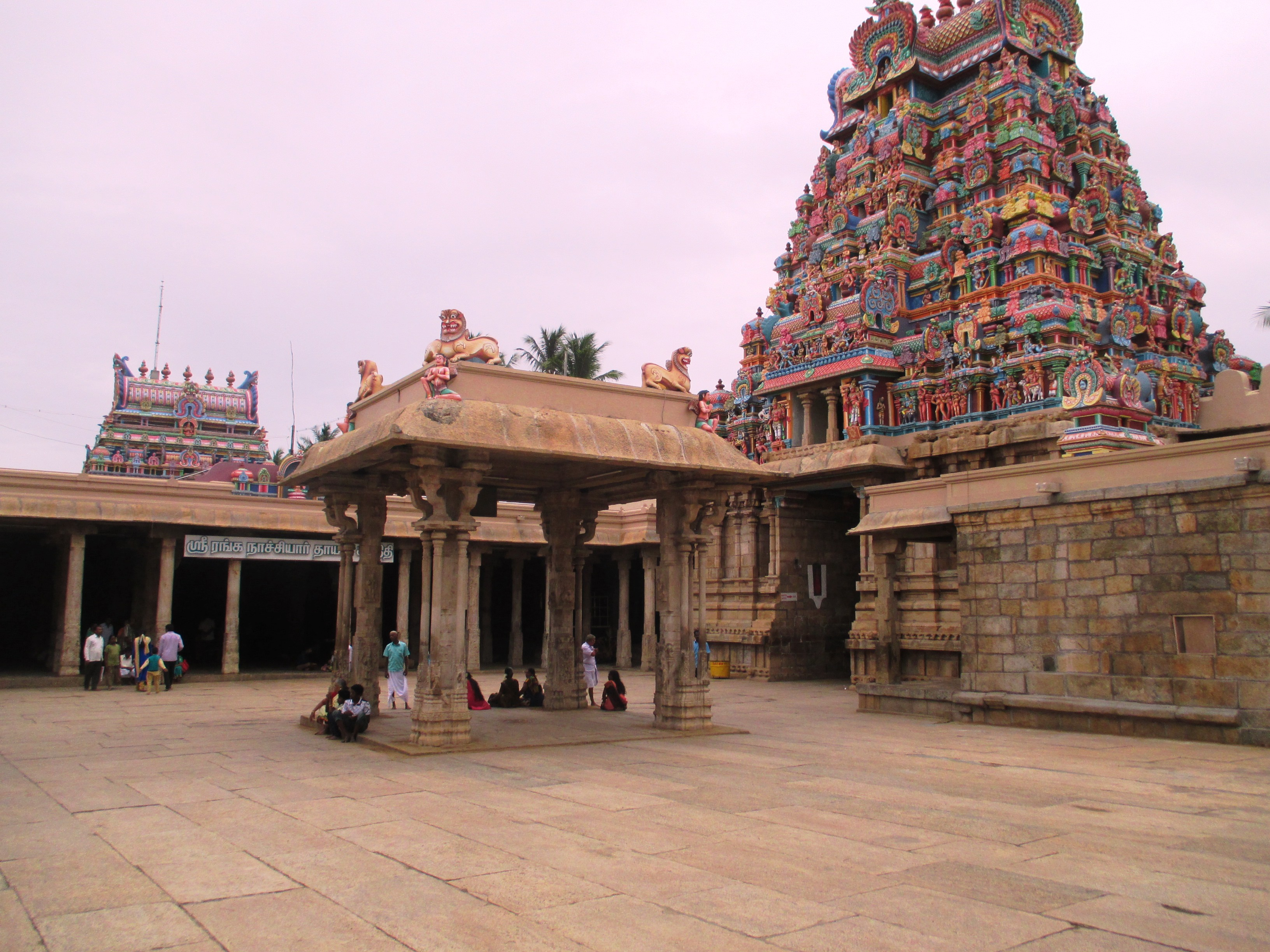
The hall, located in front of Ranganayaki's shrine, where Kambar is believed to have recited his works on Kamba Ramayanam

=== Bhakti movement ===
Ranganathaswamy temple is the only one out of the 108 temples that was sung in praise by all the Alvars (Poet-saints of the Bhakti movement), having a total of 247 pasurams (divine hymns) against its name. Acharyas (guru) of all schools of thought – Advaita, Vishistadvaita and Dvaita recognise the immense significance of the temple, regardless of their affiliations.

Naalayira Divya Prabhandam is a collection of 4000 hymns sung by twelve alvars saints spread over 300 years (from the late 6th to 9th century CE) and collected by Nathamuni (910–990 CE). Divya Desams refer to 108 Vishnu temples that are mentioned in Naalayira Divya Prabandham. 105 of these are located in India, 1 in Nepal, while 2 are located outside of the Earthly realms. Divya in Tamil language indicates premium and Desam indicates place or temple. Periyalvar begins the decad on Srirangam with two puranic stories according to which Krishna restored to life the son of his guru Sandeepani and the children of a brahmin. Thondaradippodi Alvar and Thiruppana Alvar have sung exclusively on Ranganatha. Andal attained Sri Ranganatha on completion of her Thiruppavai (a composition of 30 verses) in Srirangam. In total there are 247 hymns of the 4000 Pasurams dedicated to Ranganthar deity of this temple. Except Madhurakavi Alvar, all of the other eleven Alvars have created Mangalasasanam (praise) about the Ranganathar in Srirangam. Out of 247, 35 are by Periyalvar, 10 by Andal, 31 by Kulasekara Alvar, 14 by Thirumalisai Alvar, 55 by Thondaradippodi Alvar, 10 by Thiruppaan Alvar, 73 by Thirumangai Alvar, one by Poigai Alvar,4 by Bhoothathalvar, two by Peyalvar and twelve by Nammalvar. Kulasekarar (Cheraman II) gave up his kingdom to his son during 798 CE and started visiting temples and singing praises about them. He visited the temple, praised the presiding deity and his works are compiled in the Naalayira Divya Prabandam.

Kambar is a 12th-century Tamil poet who composed the Kamba Ramayanam, a work inspired from the epic, Valmiki Ramayana. He is believed to have come to the temple to get the approval of his work from scholars. The Jain scholar Tirunarungundam honoured the work and it resulted in Tamil and Sanskrit scholars approving the work. The open hall where he recited his verse lies close to the Ranganayaki shrine within the temple.

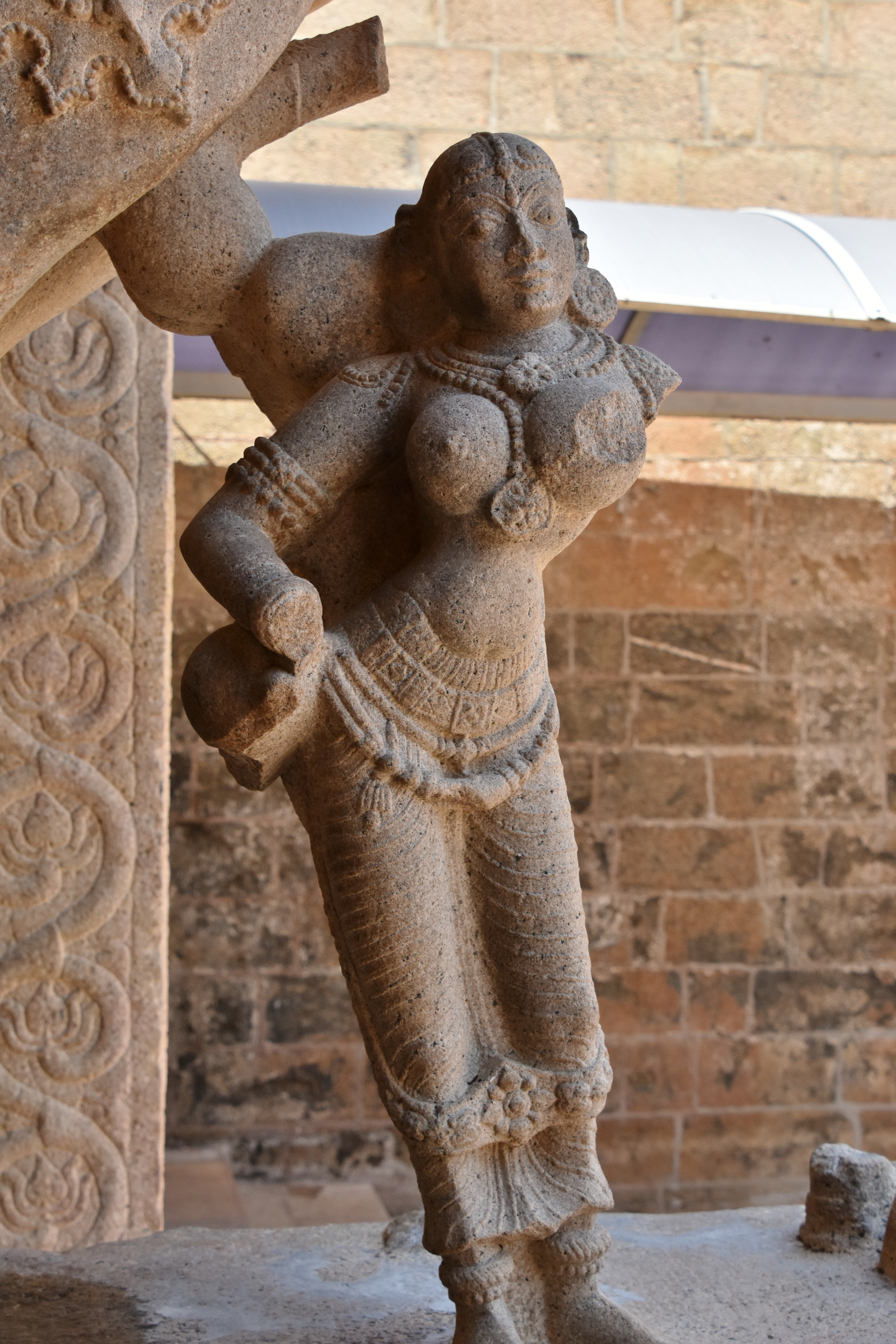
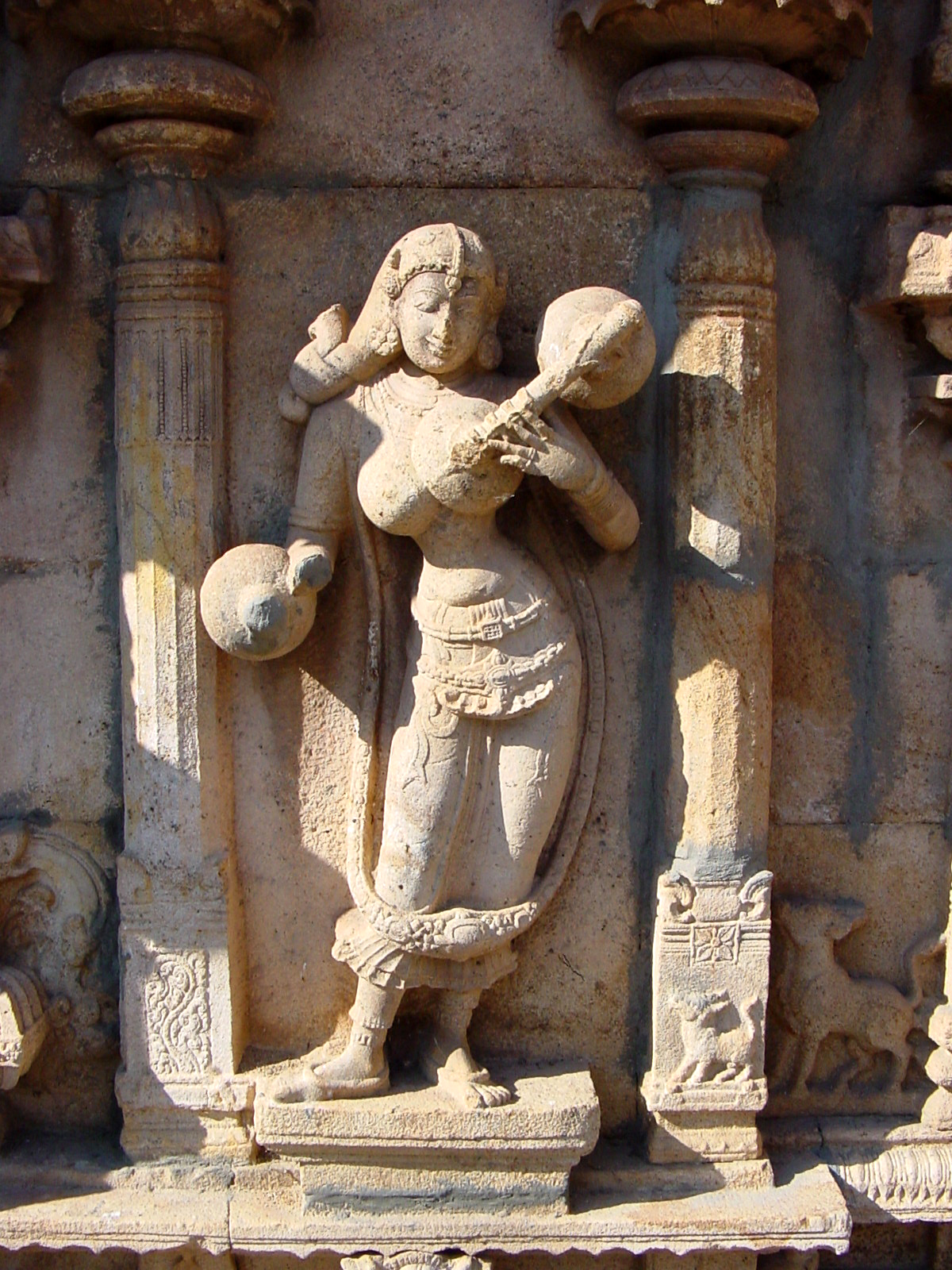
The temple was a center for music and dance learning, with many mandapam showing their sculptures.

Some of the religious works like Sri Bhashyam by Ramanuja, Gadya Traya (which is a compilation of three texts called the Saranagati Gadyam, Sriranga Gadyam and the Vaikunta Gadyam) by Ramanuja,CITEREFK.S.2002 Sri Renga natha shtakam by Adi Shankaracharya, Renga raja Stavam and Guna ratna kosham by Sri Parasar bhattar, Renga raja Sthothram by Kurathazhwar, are some of the works that were exclusively composed in praise of the presiding deities Ranganatha and goddess Ranganayaki of Srirangam temple.

Arunachala Kavirayar an 18th-century poet composed the entire Ramayana as an Opera called as Rama Natakam in Tamil language and few Manipravalam songs. This opera was Based on Kambar's and Valmiki's Ramayana (which is in Tamil and Sanskrit), the opera describes the legend of King Rama of Ayodhya. This opera was composed in the same Mandapam where Kambar composed the Ramavataram. Even though the priests permitted Arunachala Kavi to compose the Rama Natakam in Srirangam he wanted to Seek permission from Ranganatha also, He composed the keerthana “En Pallikondeeraiyaa Sri Ranganatha” (O Lord! why did you stop and sleep here?) in Kedaragowla, set to Adi tala on spot to seek Ranganatha's permission. That night both the poet and the temple Priests had separate visions of Lord Ranganatha. The poet was granted the permission and was also asked to sing about the Parivaara Devatas and the priest was asked to accept Arangetram after such songs were sung by the poet.

=== Pilgrimage ===
Koil or Kovil or koyil in Tamil refers to the house of the Master, and thus it is associated with temples. Srirangam is the most prominent among such temples. For many Vaishnavas the term Koyil exclusively refers to this temple, indicating its extreme importance for them (for Shaivas and all other Tamil people the term koyil refers to the Thillai Nataraja Golden Temple (Chidambaram Temple). The presiding deity Ranganathar is praised in many names by his devotees, including Nam Perumal (our god in Tamil), Azhagiya Manavaalan (beautiful groom in Tamil). The deity is also known as Kasturi Rangan.

The temple is considered in the Alvar traditions as one of the eight Sywayambu Kshetras of Vishnu, where the presiding deity is believed to have manifested on its own. Seven other temples in the line are Bhu Varaha Swamy temple, Tirumala Venkateswara Temple, and Vanamamalai Perumal Temple in South India and Shaligrama, Naimisaranya, Pushkar and Badrinath Temple in North India.

=== Vaishnava scholarship ===
Many of the medieval Sri Vaishanava scholars like Nathamuni, Ramanuja, Pillai Lokacharya, Vedanta Desika and Manavala Mamunigal are associated with the temple. Ramanuja was a theologian, philosopher, and scriptural exegete. He is seen by Śrīvaiṣṇavas as the third and one of the most important teacher (ācārya) of their tradition (after Nathamuni and Yamunacharya), and by Hindus in general as the leading expounder of Viśiṣṭādvaita, one of the classical interpretations of the dominant Vedanta school of Hindu philosophy. Ramanuja renounced his family life and went to Srirangam to occupy the pontificate – Srirangam became the stronghold of him and his disciples.

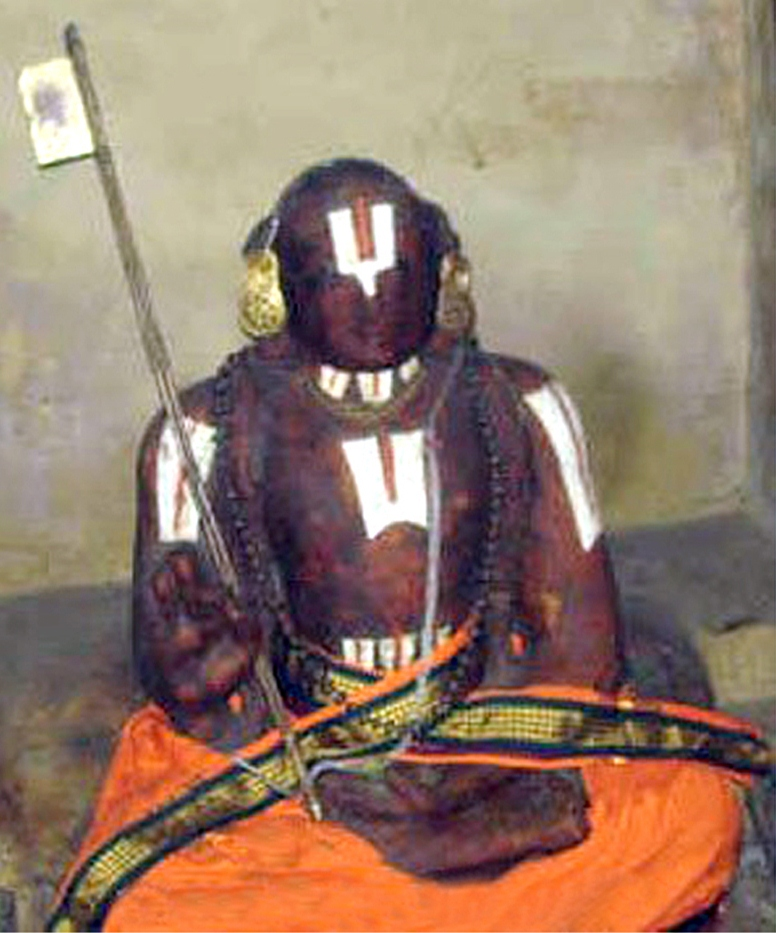
The purportedly mummified mortal remains of Ramanuja in Upadesa Mudra inside the temple.

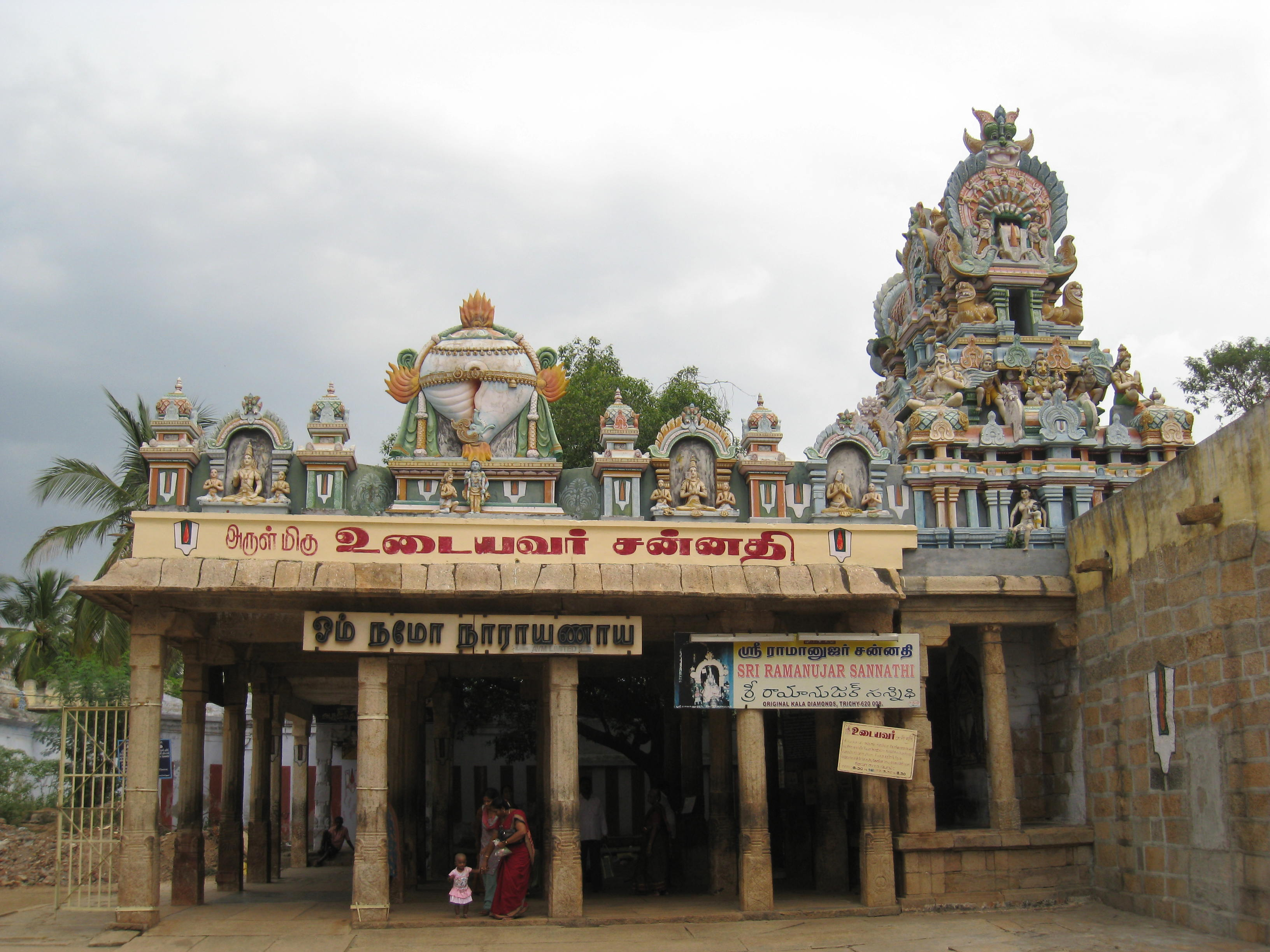
Sri Ramanuja Shrine at The Ranganathasamy Temple in Srirangam

The doctrine of Vishishtadvaita philosophy, Sri Bhashyam was written and later compiled by Ramanuja over a period of time in this temple town. During his stay in Srirangam, he is said to have written "Gadhya Thrayam", which is recited in the temple during the ninth day (Panguni Uttaram) of the festival of Adi brahmotsavam. The temple is a centre for the Vishishtadvaita school where Sanskrit Vedas and Tamil works are preached and taught with great reverence. He attained divinity in Srirangam. The disciples of Ramanuja got his permission to install three metallic images, one each at Sriperumpudur, Melukote and the third, at Srirangam. After Ramanuja's death, his body was mummified with camphor paste and saffron and was enshrined in the present-day shrine in the temple.

He is found seated in the Padmasana (yogic sitting posture), depicting the Jnana-Mudra (symbol of knowledge) with his right hand, his body is also known as "Thaanaana Thirumeni" (Selfsame body). It is often believed that Ramanuja's fingernails are still visible. "Kovil Ozhugu" is a codification of all temple practices, religious and administrative, shaped and institutionalised by Sri Ramanuja after receiving the due rights from Sri Thiruvarangathamudanar, the erstwhile temple custodian. A stone inscription to this effect is installed in the Arya Patal Vasal (main gate before the first precinct).

Pancharanga Kshetrams (also called Pancharangams, meaning the "five Rangams or Ranganathas") is a group of five sacred Hindu temples, dedicated to Ranganatha, a form of the god Vishnu, all on the banks of the Kaveri River. The five Pancharanga Kshetrams in the order of their successive locations, are: The Srirangapatna in Karnataka, (the first temple on the banks of the Kaveri River from the upstream side); The Srirangam temple, Koviladi temple at Tiruppernagar in Tamil Nadu, Parimala Ranganatha Perumal Temple at Indalur, Mayiladuthurai and Vatarangam temple at Sirkazhi. The Sarangapani temple at Kumbakonam is mentioned in place of Vatarangam in some references. Srirangam temple is also part of the Triranga pilgrimage circuit, with Srirangapatna (Adi/First Ranga) first, then Shivanasamudra (Madhya/Middle Ranga) and then Srirangam (Anthya/Last Ranga). Srirangam temple is also part of the 4 Swayam-vyakta kshetrams (4 places where Lord Vishnu self-manifested), along with Kanchipuram, Tirupati and Melukote.

== Administration ==
The temple is maintained and supervised by the Hindu Religious and Charitable Endowments Department of the Government of Tamil Nadu. An Executive officer appointed by the Board manages the temple along with Sri Azhagiya Manavala Perumal Temple in Uraiyur, Pundarikakshan Perumal Temple at Thiruvellarai, Sri Vadivazhagiya Nambi Perumal Temple and Mariamman Temple at Anbil. There are three trustees and a chairman for the board of trustees. Annadhanam scheme, which provides free food to devotees, is implemented in the temple by the Board. Under the scheme, free food is offered to two hundred devotees every day in the temple, and the expenditure is fully funded by the contributions from devotees. The only shrine that is not administered by the HRCE is the Dashavatara shrine, which is managed by the Ahobila mutt. This shrine is outside the main temple complex.

== Festivals ==
The temple celebrates numerous festivals around the year including processions. These are called utsavam (celebrations).

=== Vaikunta Ekadashi ===
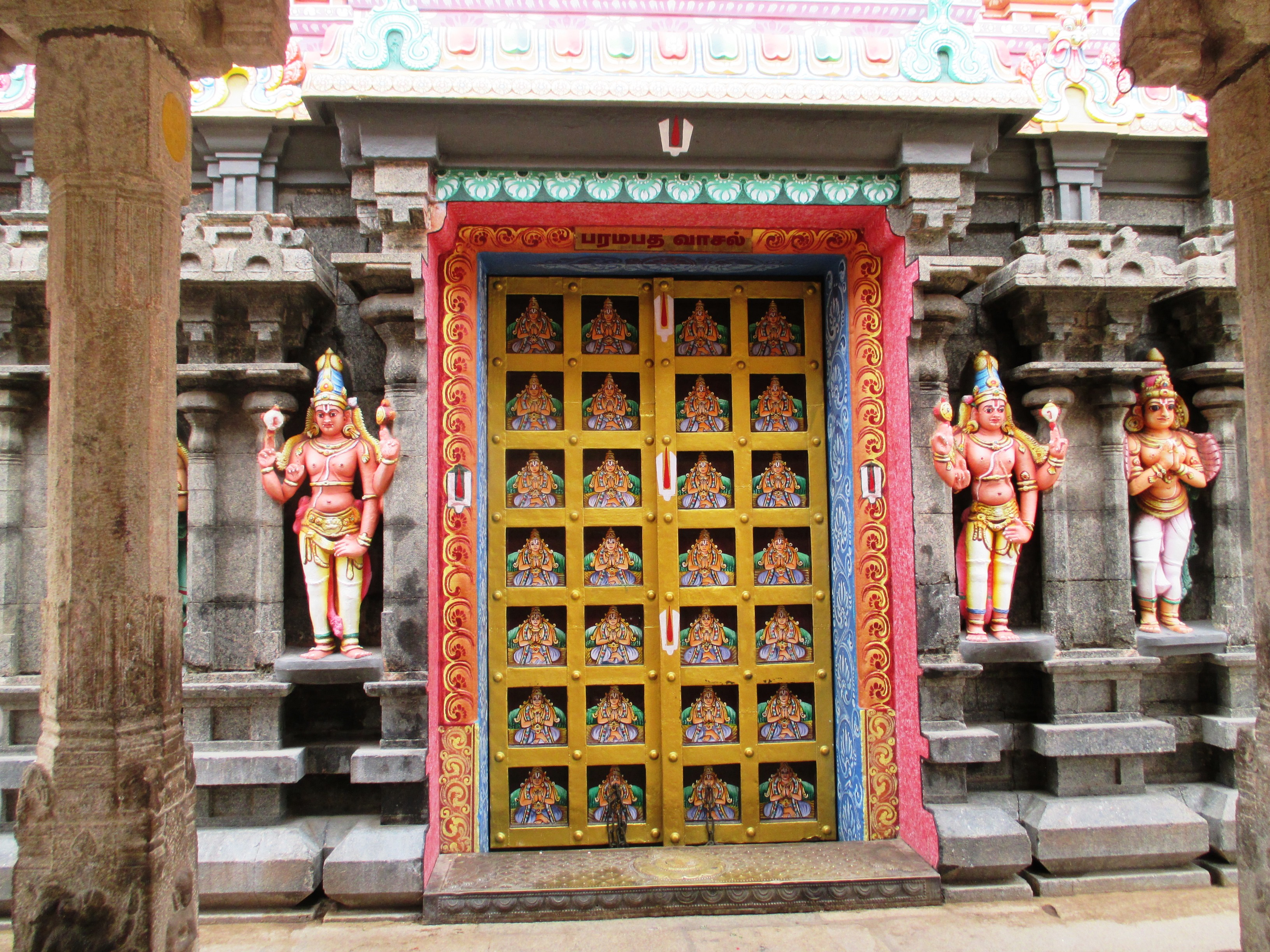
The Paramapada vaasal opens only during the 10 day festival of Vaikuntha Ekadasi

Devotees during Vaikunta Ekadasi
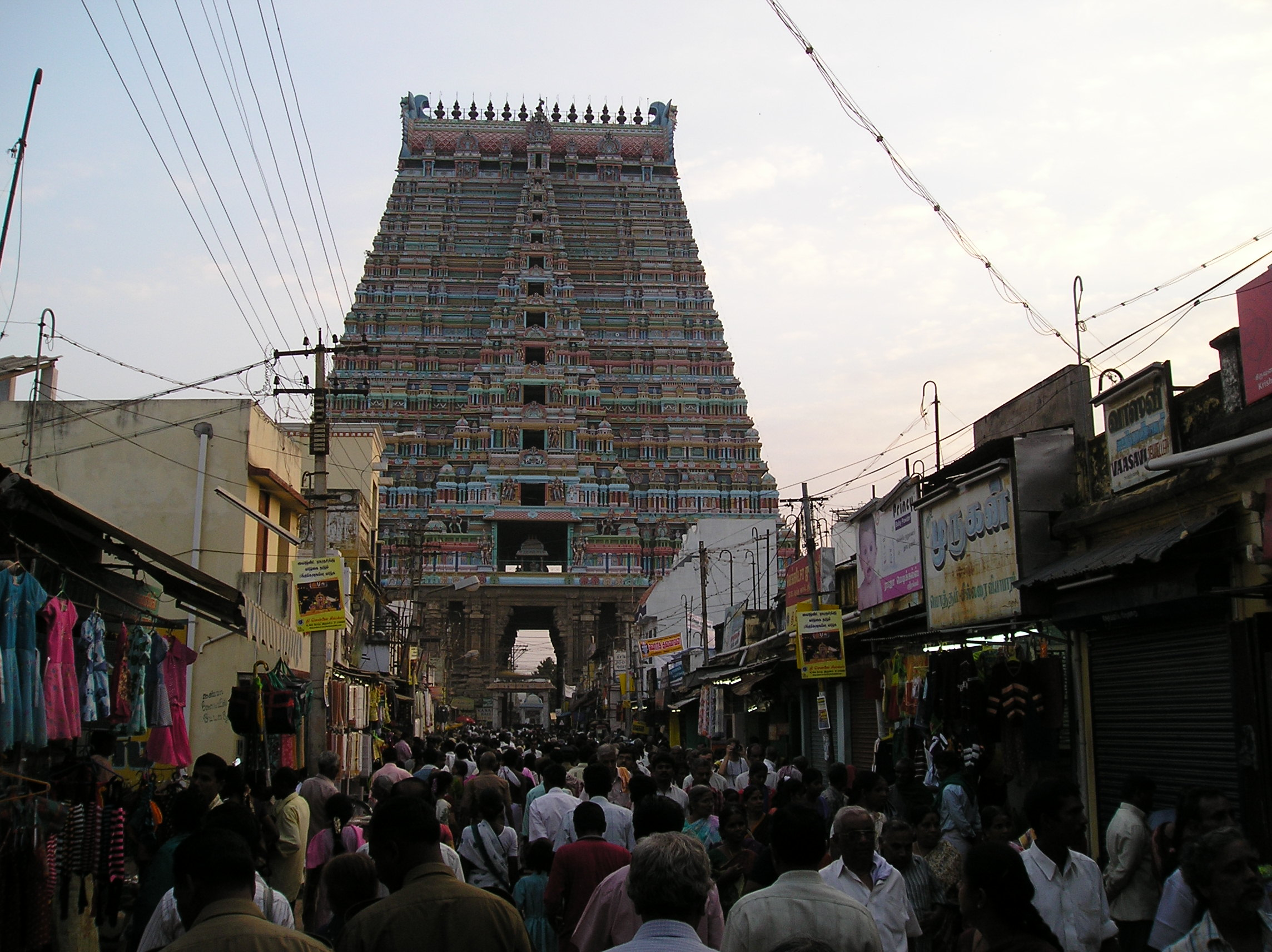
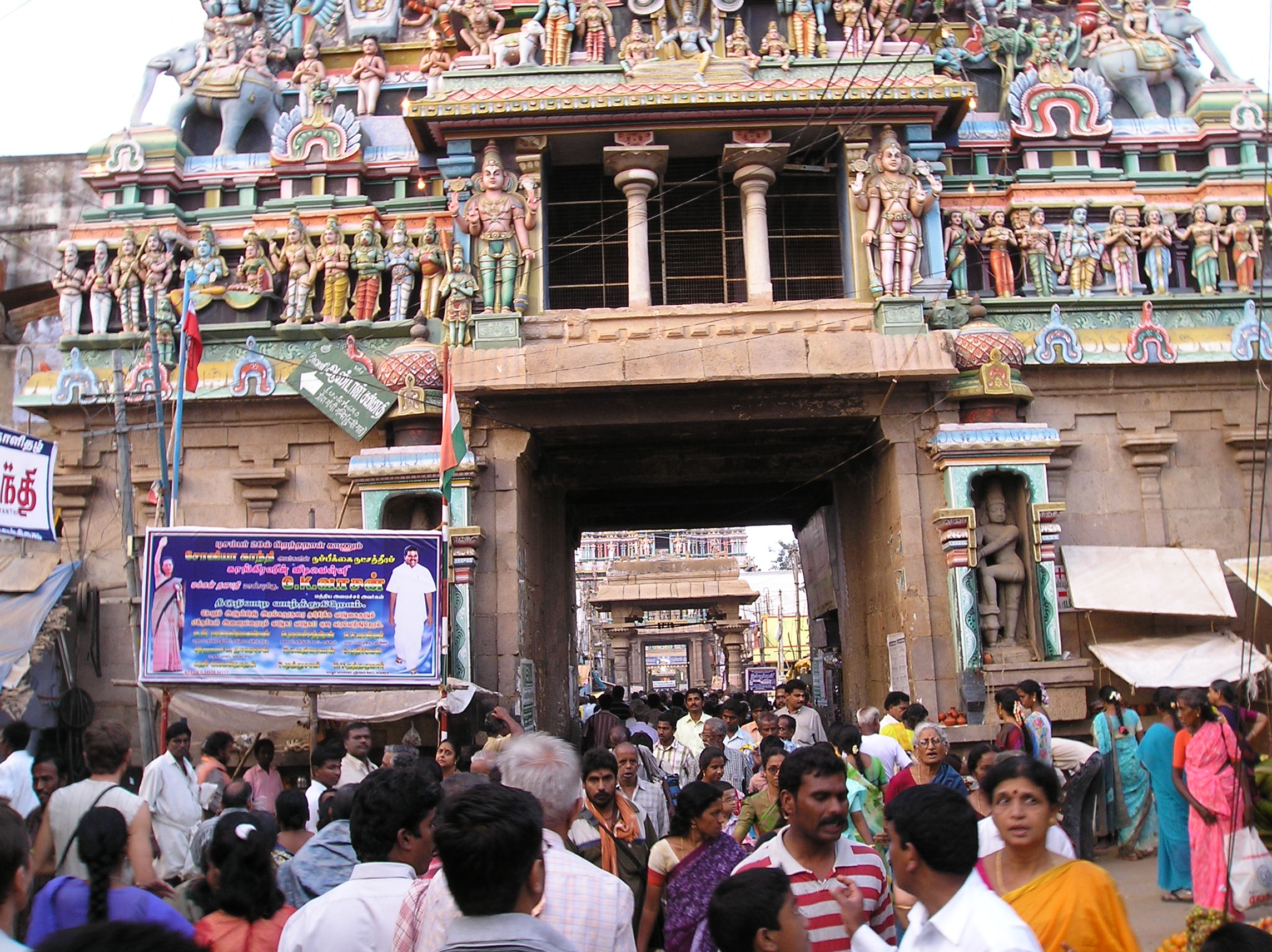

Pagal Pathu (10 day time) and Ra Pathu (10 night time) festival is celebrated in the month of Margazhi (December–January) for twenty days. The first ten days are referred as Pagal-Pathu (10-day time festival) and the second half as Ra Pathu (10 day night-time festival). The first day of Ra pathu is Vaikunta Ekadashi. The eleventh day of each fortnight in Hindu calendar is called ekadasi and the holiest of all ekadasis as per Vaishnavite tradition is the Vaikuntha Ekadashi. During the festival, through song and dance, this place is affirmed to be Bhuloka Vaikuntam (Heaven on Earth). Araiyar Sevai is a divine colloquium of araiyars, who recite and enact Nalayara Divya Prabanda, the 4000 verses of Alvars. Araiyars are born to Araiyar tradition most prevalent in Sri Vaishnava families in Srirangam, Alwar Thirunagari and Srivilliputhur. The tradition of Araiyar Sevai was started by Nathamuni during the 10th century. It is believed as per Hindu mythology that 33 crores of gods come down to witness the event. The processional deity is brought to the 1000-pillared hall on the morning of Vaikunta Ekadashi through the Paramapada Vasal (gate to paradise). Lakhs of pilgrims rush to enter it after the gate is opened and the deity passes through it as it is believed that one who enters here will reach Vaikuntham (the abode of Vishnu) after death. The gate is open only during the ten days of Ra Pathu (10-day night-time festival). On the last day of the festival, the poet Nammalvar is said to be given salvation. The performance is enacted by priests and images in the temple depicts Nammalvar as reaching heaven and getting liberation from the cycle of life and death. At that point, a member from the crowd of devotees, who are witnessing this passion play, goes up to the centre stage and requests Vishnu to return Nammalvar to humanity, so that his words and form in the temple will continue to inspire and save the devotees. Following this performance of the salvation of Nammalvar, the cantors are taken in procession round the temple.

=== Jyestabishekam ===
Jyestabishekam (first of anointing) is an annual three day festival celebrated at the temple during the Tamil month of aani (June–July). On each day of the festival the deities are adorned with different kavacham or armours once the golden armour is ceremoniously removed. On the first day the deities are adorned with a diamond armour, on the second day a pearl armour, and on the third day a gold armour.
