= Srinivasa (disambiguation) =

Srinivasa or Venkateswara is a form of the Hindu god Vishnu.

Srinivasa may also refer to:

== People ==
- Srinivasa Ramanujan (1887–1920), Indian mathematician
- S. R. Srinivasa Varadhan (born 1940), Indian-American mathematician
- Srinivasa Murthy (born 1949), Indian actor and television director
- Srinivasa Reddy (born 1973), Telugu comedian and actor
- Srinivasacharya 7th Century indian philosopher

== See also ==
- Srinivasa Iyengar (disambiguation)
- Srinivas or Srinivasan, alternative form of the Indian male given name
- Srinivasan (Tamil actor), Indian actor and comedian
- Srinivas (singer), an Indian singer
- Srinivas, a character in the Indian KGF (film series)
- Srinivasa Nagar, Tiruchirappalli, neighbourhood of Tiruchirappalli, Tamil Nadu, India
