= Pancha Bhuta Sthalam =

Five temples dedicated to Shiva

The Pancha Bhuta Sthalam (Tamil: பஞ்சபூதத் தலங்கள், Sanskrit: पञ्चभूत स्थलम्, romanized: Pañcabhūta Sthalam) refers to five temples dedicated to Shiva, each representing a manifestation of the five prime elements of nature: earth, water, fire, air, and ether. Pancha indicates "five," Bhuta means "elements," and Sthala means "place." The temples are located in South India, four in Tamil Nadu and one in Andhra Pradesh. The five elements are believed to be enshrined in the five lingams of the temples, with each lingam named on the element represented. All five temples are located around the 78°E and 79°E longitudes and between 10°N and 14°N latitudes.

The presiding deities are revered in the 7th century Tamil Shaiva canonical work, the Tevaram, written by Tamil saint poets known as the Nayanars and classified as Paadal Petra Sthalam. The four temples in Tamil Nadu are maintained and administered by the Hindu Religious and Charitable Endowments Department of the Government of Tamil Nadu.

== Pancha Bhutam ==
According to the Vedas, the material world is a combination of the five fundamental elements of nature namely earth, water, fire, air, and ether. Bhuta (Sanskrit:भूत) in Sanskrit means element and maha bhoota indicates a fundamental element. According to Ayurveda, an ancient Indian medical system, the equilibrium of the body with the pancha bhuta is governed by the principles of tridoshas - kaph (phlegm), pitta (bile), vayu (gas), dhātu and malas (waste products). Rabindranath Tagore, in his book Pancha bhoota, has explained the emotional faculty of the human mind is keenly sensitive to all objects of light, colour, sound, effect of speed, sun, moon and stars.

== The five temples ==
Temple locations

In the temples, Shiva is said to have manifested himself in the respective forms of the five elements. . The Agni (fire) Lingam explains the mythics of life - duty, virtue, self-sacrifice and finally liberation by and through ascetic life at the end of Agni kalpa. The five lingams are revered in the 7th century Tamil Shaiva canonical work, the Tevaram, written by Tamil saint poets known as the Nayanars and classified as Paadal Petra Sthalam. Four lingams (earth, water, fire and space) are in Tamil Nadu while the air lingam (Srikalahasti) is in Andhra Pradesh. Three of the four temples in Tamil Nadu are maintained and administered by the Hindu Religious and Charitable Endowments Department of the Government of Tamil Nadu. Maintenance and administration of the Space lingam is ensured by a religious denominational community called the Dikshitars.

Element	Lingam	Temple	Photo	Location	Details
Earth	Bhumi Lingam	Ekambareswarar Temple		Kanchipuram 12°50′51″N 79°42′00″E	Shiva is worshipped as Ekambareswarar or Ekambaranathar, and is represented by the lingam, with his idol referred to as Prithvi (earth) lingam. The temple complex covers 25 acres and is one of the largest in India. It houses four gateway towers known as gopurams. The tallest is the southern tower, with 11 stories and a height of 58.5216 metres (192 ft), making it one of the tallest temple towers in India. The temple complex houses many halls; the most notable is the thousand-pillared hall built during the Vijayanagara period. Legend has it that once Parvati, the consort of Shiva, wanted to expiate herself from sin by doing penance under the temple's ancient Mango tree near the Vegavati river. She created the lingam out of wet soil. This lingam is now covered with silver.
Water	Varuna Lingam (Jambu Lingam)	Jambukeshwarar Temple, Thiruvanaikaval		Thiruvanaikaval, near Trichy 10°51′12″N 78°42′20″E	The sanctum of Jambukeswara has the copper plated lingam and an underground water stream, and despite draining the water out, it is always filled with water. Once, Parvati mocked Shiva's penance for the betterment of the world. Shiva wanted to condemn her act and banished her to the earth from Mount Kailash (Shiva's heavenly abode) to do penance. Parvati, in the form of Akhilandeshwari as per Shiva's wish, found the Jambu forest to conduct her penance. She made a lingam out of water of the river Kaveri (also called as river Ponni) under the Venn Naaval tree (the jambu tree on top of the saint Jambu) and commenced her worship. The lingam is known as Appu Lingam or Jala Lingam (Water Lingam). There are five enclosures inside the temple. The massive outer wall covering the fifth precinct, known as the Vibhuti Prakara, stretches over a mile and is two feet thick and over 25 feet high. Legend maintains that the wall was built by Shiva working with the labourers. The fourth precinct contains a hall with 796 pillars and measures 2436 feet by 1493.
Fire	Agni Lingam (Jyothi Lingam)	Annamalaiyar Temple		Thiruvannamalai 12°13′31.02″N 79°4′28.91″E	Shiva is worshipped as Annamalaiyar or Arunachaleshwar, and is represented by a silver plated lingam, with his idol referred to as Agni lingam. The sanctum inside is always lit by fire lamps. The 9th-century Shaiva saint poet Manikkavacakar composed the Tiruvempaavai here. The temple complex covers 10 hectares and is one of the largest in India. It houses four gateway towers known as gopurams. The tallest is the eastern tower, with 11 stories and a height of 66 metres (217 ft), making it one of the tallest temple towers in India built by Sevappa Nayakar (Nayakar dynasty). The temple complex houses many halls; the most notable is the thousand-pillared hall built during the Vijayanagar period. The Karthika Deepam festival is celebrated during the day of the full moon between November and December, and a huge beacon is lit atop the nearby Annamalai hill. It can be seen from miles around, and symbolises the Shiva lingam of fire joining the sky. The event is witnessed by three million pilgrims. On the day preceding each full moon, pilgrims circumnavigate the temple base and the Annamalai hills in a worship called Girivalam, a practice carried out by one million pilgrims yearly.
Air	Vayu Lingam	Srikalahasti Temple		Kalahasthi, Andhra Pradesh 13°44′58″N 79°41′54″E	Srikalahasthi is one of the most famous Shiva temples in South India, and is said to be the site where Kannappa was ready to offer both his eyes to cover blood flowing from the Siva linga before the Siva stopped him and granted him moksha. The temple is also regarded as Rahu-Ketu kshetra and Dakshina Kailasam. The inner temple was constructed around the 5th century, and the outer temple was constructed in the 11th century by the Rajendra Chola I, later Chola kings and the Vijayanagara kings. Shiva, in his aspect as Vayu, is worshiped as Kalahasteeswara. The white stone lingam inside was believed to have been created by the wind deity Vayu, by solidifying raw camphor (pacha-karpuram). Miraculously, this camphor lingam has never caught fire despite it being closely surrounded by numerous lamps.
Ether or Space	Indra Lingam (Akasha Lingam)	Thillai Natarajar Temple		Chidambaram 11°23′58″N 79°41′36″E	Chidambaram, the name of the city and the temple, literally means "atmosphere of wisdom" or "clothed in consciousness"; the temple architecture symbolises the connection between the arts and spirituality, creative activity and the divine. The temple wall carvings display all the 108 karanas from the Natya Shastra by Bharata Muni, and these postures form a foundation of Bharatanatyam, a classical Indian dance. The present temple was built in the 10th century when Chidambaram was the capital of the Chola dynasty, making it one of the oldest surviving active temple complexes in South India. After its 10th-century consecration by the Cholas who considered Nataraja as their family deity, Shiva himself is idolised in three forms, as a crystal lingam, as a formless space covered by curtains (Chidambaram rahasyam), and as the Nataraja performing the Ananda Tandava ("Dance of Delight") in the golden hall of the shrine Pon Ambalam. The temple is one of the five elemental lingas in the Shaivism pilgrimage tradition, and considered the subtlest of all Shiva temples (Kovil) in Hinduism. It is also a site for performance arts, including the annual Natyanjali dance festival on Maha Shivaratri.

== Pancha Bhuta Linga Kritis of Muthuswami Dikshitar ==
Muthuswami Dikshitar composed many Krithis in groups.The Panchabhoothalinga Krithis of Dikshitar are dedicated to these five forms of Lord Siva. These Krithis are composed respectively at the temples of Chidambaram (ether), Kalahasti (air), Tiruvannamalai (fire), Kanchipuram (earth) and Jambukesvaram (water).

Kriti	Raga	Tala	Kshetra
Ananda Natana Prakasam	Kedaram	Misra Chapu	Chidambaram - Akasa Linga
Arunachalanatham	Saranga	Rupakam	Arunacalam (Tiruvannamalai) - Agni Linga
Chintaya Makanda	Bhairavi	Rupakam	Kancipuram - Prthvi Linga
Jambupathe	Yamunakalyani	Tisra Ekam	Thiruvanaikaval - Appu/jala Linga
Sri Kalahastisha	Huseini	Kandha Chapu	Sri Kalahasti - Vayu Linga
