= Akhilandeshwari =

Hindu goddess

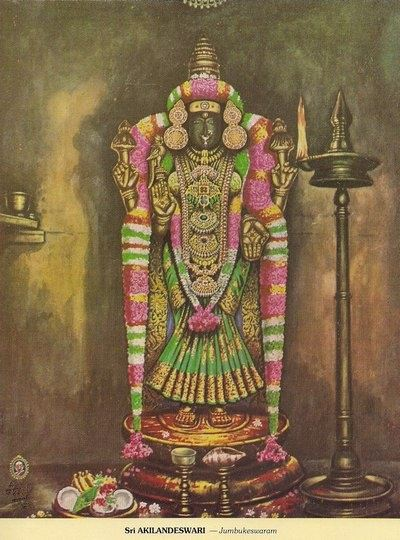
Idol of Goddess Akhilandeshwari at the Jambukeswarar Temple in Thiruvanaikaval.

Akhilandeshwari (Sanskrit: अखिलाण्डेश्वरी, IAST: Akhilāṇḍeśvarī) is one of the main forms of the Hindu Goddess Adi Parashakti. She is revered as an embodiment of Parvati. The famous abode of Akhilandeshwari is the Jambukeswarar Temple in Thiruvanaikaval. She is also revered collectively with the goddesses Meenakshi and Kamakshi, forming the Trishakti triad, the most powerful goddesses in Shaktism. The goddess’s name in Tamil is split into three components அகில ஆண்ட ஈஸ்வரி. “Akhila” means the universe, “Anda” means ruling, and “Ishwari” means the divine mother. Therefore, Goddess, the divine mother who rules the entire universe, is known as “Akhilandeshwari”. Akhilandeshwari is the presiding deity in the Jambukeswarar Temple in Thiruvanaikaval along with her consort Jambukeswarar, who is an avatar of Shiva.

== Legend ==
Once Parvati mocked Shiva's penance for the betterment of the world. Shiva wanted to condemn her act and directed her to go to the Earth from Mount Kailash (Shiva's abode) to do penance. Parvati in the form of Akhilandeshwari as per Shiva's wish found the Jambu forest to conduct her penance. She made a lingam out of the water from the Kaveri river, (also called as Ponni River) under the Venn Naaval tree (the Venn Naaval tree on top of the saint Jambu) and commenced her worship. The lingam is known as Appu Lingam (Water Lingam). Shiva at last appeared in front of Akhilandeshwari and taught her Shiva Gnana. Akhilandeshwari took Upadesa (lessons) facing East from Shiva, who stood facing west. Just because of this till today during Uchi Kala Puja (Around Noon), the priest of Akhilandeshwari's temple dresses up like a woman, goes to the sanctum of Jambukeswara Shiva and offers prayers and performs puja to Shiva and Kamadhenu (Cow deity). It is believed that Akhilandeshwari comes in the form of a priest to worship Shiva and the temple cow as Kamadhenu. Thiruvanaikovil is one of the temples where Akhilandeshwari is worshipped as a form of Adi Parashakti.

Another legend surrounds the Jambukeswarar Temple. Two attendants of Shiva, namely Malyavan and Pushpadanta always quarrelled with each other over one thing or the other. During a quarrel, Malyavan cursed Pushpadanta to become an elephant and the latter cursed the former to become a spider in their next births. The elephant and the spider arrived at Thiruvanaikovil and found the Appu Lingam under the Venn Naaval tree in the Jambu forest. Thus, the animals started their worship of Shiva. The elephant collected water from the nearby Kaveri River and performed abhishekam (ablution) to the lingam. The spider constructed a web to prevent dust, dry leaves and direct sunlight from falling on the lingam. One day, The elephant saw the web over the lingam. It thought there was dust on the lingam and destroyed the web. It later collected water and performed abhishekam again. This went on every day. One day, the spider was angry over the overall destruction of its webs, crawled into the trunk of the elephant and bit the elephant to death. The spider died during the act. Moved by the deep devotion of the two, Shiva appeared and gave moksha (liberation) to the elephant and the spider, who were his attendants in their past lives.

There's also another story. After the creation of the heaven, earth and the sky, Brahma created a woman (sometimes identified as Saraswati). Unfortunately, Brahma fell in love with the woman. Due to his lust for the woman, Brahma could not do his duty properly. The woman wanted to get away from the lust of Brahma and tried to move away, but a head of Brahma sprouted wherever she went. Brahma now had 5 heads. The woman went to Shiva and asked for help. Shiva agreed and went to Brahma. Shiva took the form of Bhairava, flung his trident and cut off the 5th head of Brahma, leaving only 4 heads. Brahma then repented for his actions and decided to do penance. Moved by his deep devotion, Shiva and Parvati appeared dressed as Parvati and Shiva respectively. When Brahma opened his eyes, he could not recognize them and tell who was who. Brahma later asked for repentance and Shiva agreed as he and Parvati appeared again in their true form. Hence, till the present, the event is recreated in a procession where the procession deities of Shiva and Parvati are dressed and vice versa and carried through all the five outer parts (prakaras) of the temple which is celebrated as Pancha-Prakara Vizha.

There's also a story in which Shiva came in the form of a saint called Vibhooti Seethar and built a wall, as per the wish of the King who ruled the place. It is believed that Rama worshipped Shiva here and hence, as proof, the lake of Rama (Rama Tirtham) is present here. It is also believed that Brahma and Indra worshipped Akhilandeshwari here and composed stotrams, namely the,

- Brahma Kruta Akhilandeshwari Stotram
- Indra Kruta Akhilandeshwari Stotram.

== Worship ==
The idols (moola murtis) of Jambukeswarar (Shiva) and Akhilandeswari are installed opposite to each other – Such temples are known as Upadesa Sthalams. As Akhilandeswari was like a student and Jambukeswara was like a Guru (teacher) in this temple, there is no Thirukalyanam (marriage) conducted in this temple for Jambukeswarar and Akhilandeswari, unlike the other Shiva temples. The sanctum sanctorum (garbhagriha) of goddess Akhilandeswari and the sanctum sanctorum of Prasanna Ganapathi are in the shape of the pranava mantra, "Om" in Tamil script. It is believed that Akhilandeswari was originally an angry deity (ugra devata) and devotees would pray to her only from the outside of the temple. Hence, during one of Adi Sankara's visits, he installed the Prasanna Ganapathi idol right opposite her sanctum and installed a pair of Sri Chakra thaatankas (ear-rings) to reduce her anger. The Sri Chakra carvings on the earrings eventually absorbed the angry power of the goddess and continue to hold it to this day. Apart from daytime when she is Akhilandeswari and after Arthajama puja during the night time she again returns to her fierce form. No one dares to enter once her sanctum is closed. Even many have witnessed the glimpse of her during Arthajama pooja. Akhilandeswari is such a kind goddess who fulfills our wishes if we seek her with true devotion and love. The Jambukeswarar Temple of Thiruvanaikovil is located near the Sri Ranganathaswami Temple of Srirangam, which is home to the deity Ranganatha. Hence during the Tamil month of Margazhi, it is believed that Ranganatha sends garlands, jewellery, sarees and gifts to his sister Akhilandeswari.

The cleaning and reconsecration of the Sri Chakra earrings are always carried out by the Shankaracharyas of the Kanchi Kamakoti Peetham. In the 1970s, the kumbhabhishekam of the Akhilandeshwari shrine was performed by Mahaperiyava Chandrashekharendra Saraswati VIII, the 68th Shankaracharya. The last clean-up of the earrings was performed by Vijayendra Saraswati Swamigal, the 70th Shankaracharya in 2024. In the presence of the head priests of the temple, the earrings were removed from Goddess Akhilandeshwari's idol and her shrine was temporarily closed after necessary Hindu mantras were chanted. The earrings were found to be attached to a very thick and strong cord, made specifically to bear the weight of the heavy earrings. In pictures posted to social media, the Sri Chakra is carved only on the lower part of the earstuds, as opposed to the commonly believed upper part. The clean-up involved removal of the earrings, removal of the tiny gemstones, polishing of the gold frame (which had blackened due to continuous soot from the daily Aarti) and re-installing the gemstones properly. The earrings were re-consecrated back in the temple after a week in accordance with Hindu scriptures and chanting of mantras.

== In popular culture ==
Muthuswamy Dikshitar, the 18th-century composer of Carnatic Music, composed three songs in honour of Akhilandeshwari, specifically at the Jambukeswarar Temple in Thiruvanaikaval.

Kriti	Raga	Tala	Description
Akhilandeshwari Rakshamam	Dwijavanti	Adi	
Akhilandeshwaryai Namaste	Arabi	Adi	
Akhilandeshvaro Rakshatu	Shuddha Saveri	Rupaka	

In 2012, P. Unni Krishnan and Harini, the renowned vocalists rendered songs on Adi Parashakti through a devotional album titled Om Nava Sakthi Jaya Jaya Sakthi, in which Goddess Akhilandeshwari was also praised through a dedicated song. This song contains depiction on the Jambukeshwarar Temple and its complete history captured in a most charming manner.
