= Srirangam =

Region of Tiruchirappalli, Tamil Nadu

Srirangam Tiruvarangam
- Neighbourhood
- Tiruvarangam
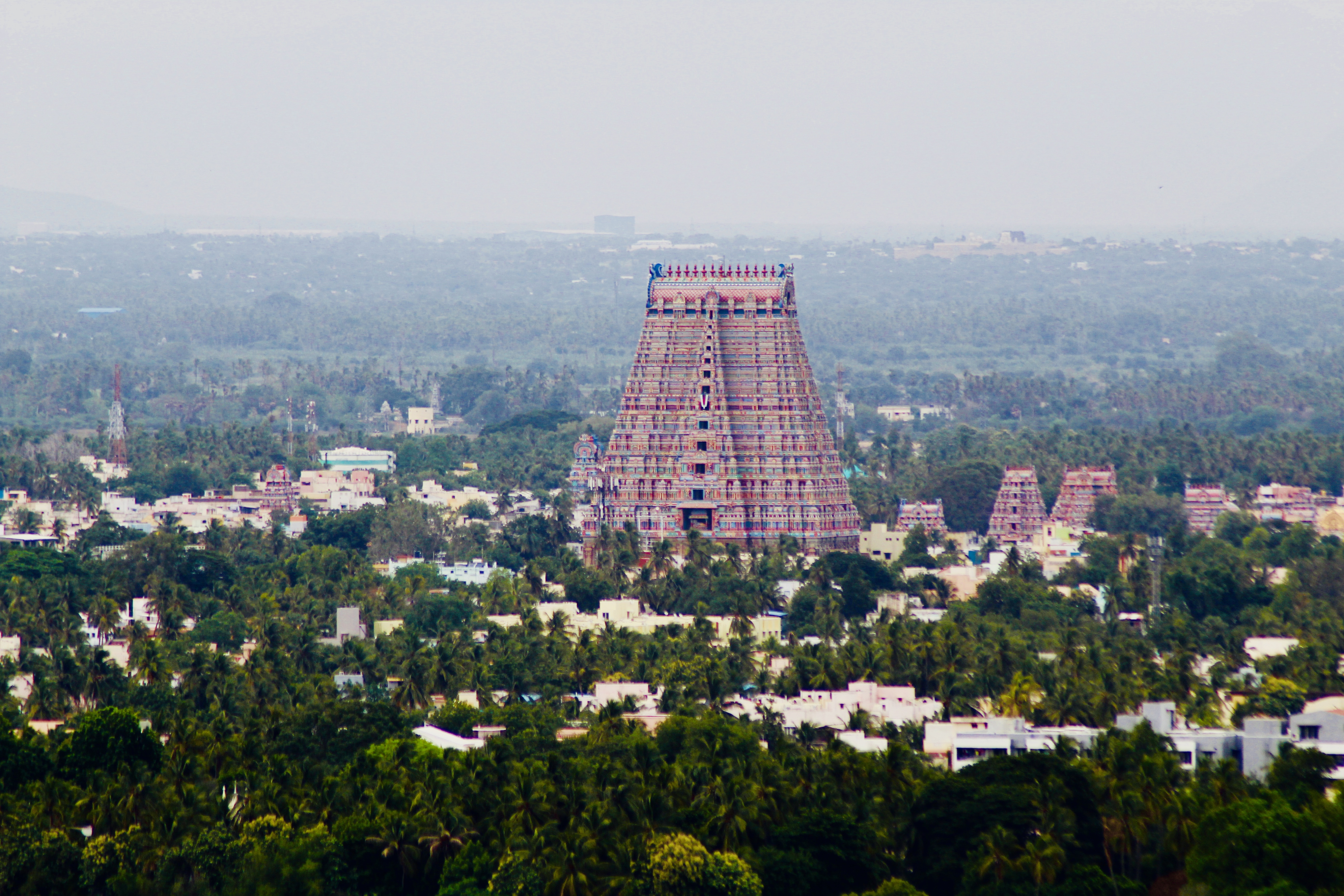
- Aerial view of the Ranganathaswamy Temple, Srirangam in Srirangam

- Location within Tamil Nadu Location within India
- Coordinates: 10.87°N 78.68°E
- Country: India
- State: Tamil Nadu
- City: Tiruchirappalli

Government
  - Type: City Municipal Corporation
  - Body: Tiruchirappalli City Municipal Corporation- Srirangam Zone
- Elevation: 70 m (230 ft)

Population (2001)
  - Total: 181,556

Language
  - Official: Tamil
- Time zone: UTC+5:30 (IST)
- PIN: 620006
- Telephone code: 91–431
- Vehicle registration: TN-48
- Lok Sabha constituency: Tiruchirapalli
- Legislative Assembly constituency: Srirangam
- Website: https://srirangam.org/ https://trichycorporation.gov.in

Srirangam is a neighbourhood in the city of Tiruchirappalli in the Indian state of Tamil Nadu. Forming a river island, Srirangam is bounded by the Kaveri River to the south and its distributary, Kollidam to the north. Considered as the first among the 108 Divya Desams, a group of Vishnu temples, it is famous for the Ranganathaswamy Temple, the largest temple complex in India and the biggest functioning Hindu temple in the world. Srirangam is also home to a significant population of adherents of the Sri Vaishnava tradition.

== Etymology ==
Old Tamil literature refers to the place as Tiruvarangam or often arangam. The place finds a mention in one of the Five Great Epics of Tamil Litrature Cilappatikaram. The epic describes Kovalan meeting a Brahmin and asks what brought him to Uraiyur, and the Brahmin Replied "I came to satisfy my heart's desire, to see with my own eyes the glory of Vishnu, whom many worship with prayer as He reposes with Lakshmi in His chest, on the couch of the thousand hooded Serpent, in the temple in island jutting out on the widening waves of the Kaveri, even as the blue clouds repose supine on the slopes of the lofty golden mountain (Meru)." There are many other places mentioning Srirangam in Cilappatikaram and also finds mention in Akananuru poem 137.

Srirangam The name owes itself to the legend that once the holy vimana (Sriranga Vimana) of Vishnu, which is believed to have become stranded at this place. An isle lying in the midst of the winding branches of a river is called arangam in Tamil. Thus, the spot came to be known as Srirangam in Sanskrit ("Shri-Rangam") and Tiruvarangam (Thiru + Arangam = Thiruvarangam) in Tamil. "Shri" in Sanskrit and "Thiru" in Tamil are prefixes indicating respect and reverence, i.e. "Holy Rangam".

== Sri Ranganathaswamy Temple ==
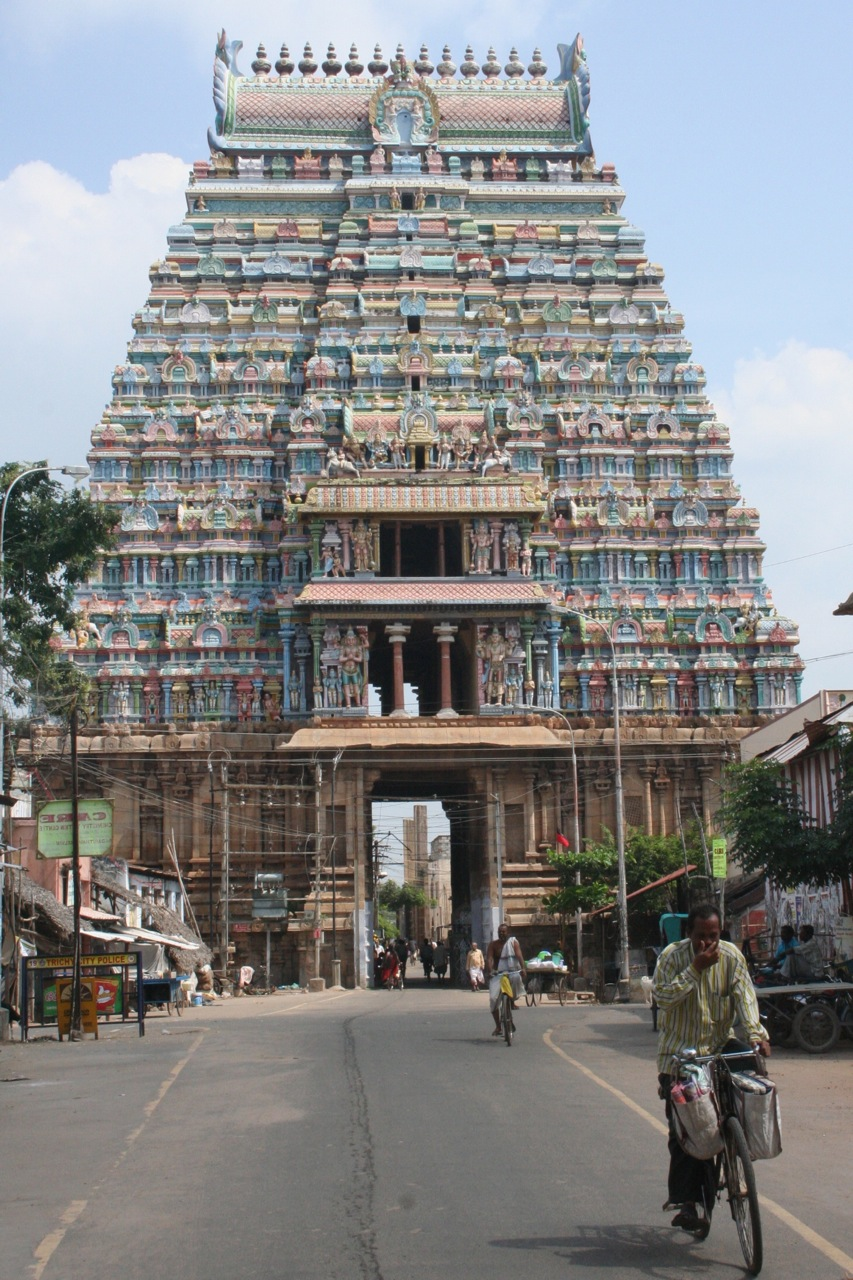
One of the gopurams out of the 21 present in the Sri Ranganathaswamy Temple, Srirangam

Srirangam is famous for its Sri Ranganathaswamy Temple, a major pilgrimage destination for Hindus (especially Sri Vaishnavas) and the largest temple complex in India.

According to the UNESCO, Srirangam is the biggest functioning Hindu temple in the world, as it covers an area of about 631,000 square metres (6,790,000 sq ft) with a perimeter of 4 km (10,710 ft), Angkor Wat which is also dedicated to Vishnu is even bigger but services do not take place any more in the temple.

Srirangam is one of a few self-manifested shrines (Svayam Vyakta Kshetras) of Vishnu. The temple complex spans 156 acres (0.63 km^{2}). It has seven prakaras (enclosures). These enclosures are formed by tall, thick rampart walls running around the sanctum. There are 21 towers, gopurams, in all prakaras decreasing in height inwards. The temple town lies on an islet formed by the rivers Kaveri and Kollidam.

The southern gopuram of the temple, called the Rajagopuram, is 239.5 feet tall and, as of 2016, is the tallest in Asia. The construction of the Rajagopuram began during the reign of Achyuta Deva Raya of the Vijayanagara empire. However, construction was halted after his death and the structure of the Rajagopuram remained incomplete for over 400 years. The completion of the Rajagopuram was undertaken and completed successfully by Sri Vedanta Desika Yatheendra Mahadesikan, the 44th jeeyar of Sri Ahobila Matha. The construction spanned 8 years before it was consecrated on 25 March 1987.

In historic times, just after the construction of this temple, the city of Srirangam lived completely within the walls of this temple, and is often described as a Hindu religious utopia.

The Srirangam temple is one of the three temples of the deity Ranganatha (Antya Ranga) that are situated in the natural islands formed in the Kaveri river. They are:

- Adi Ranga: the Sri Ranganathaswamy Temple at Srirangapatna, Srirangapatna taluk, Mandya district, Karnataka, India
- Madhya Ranga: the Sri Ranganathaswamy Temple at Shivanasamudra, Kollegala taluk, Chamarajanagara district, Karnataka, India
- Antya Ranga: the Sri Ranganathaswamy Temple at Srirangam, Srirangam taluk, Tiruchirappalli district, Tamil Nadu, India

There is a gopuram fully made of gold, which is protected by an electrical fence. Clothes such as silk sarees, dhoti and towels, which are used for religious purposes are auctioned here.

Ramanuja (11th century), one of the most celebrated theologians of Hinduism, made his monastic home by the temple at Srirangam. Here he wrote his famous commentaries on the Brahma Sutra, which expressed a qualified non-dualism of the Vedanta, his Vishishtadvaita. Ramanuja's body is said to come out of the Earth after he was buried and was preserved at this temple. Although, Ramanujar hailed from Sriperumbudur and a pivotal point in his lifetime, receiving the Ashtakshara mantram, happened in Thirukoshtiyur, he made Srirangam his home after the demise of his Acharya in spirit, Alavanthar or Yamunacharya.

Inside the temple complex, there is a separate temple dedicated to the goddess Andal. Additionally, there is a museum, a library and a bookshop.

== Legend ==
According to the regional legend, the deity Rama is regarded to have performed aradhanam (puja) to Vishnu's idol (deity in a reclining posture). He is regarded to have granted the idol to Vibhishana (the brother of Ravana of the Hindu epic Ramayana) to take back with him to Lanka. Rama informed him that he could not set the idol upon the earth; if he did so, the idol would become bound upon the site. While travelling towards Lanka, he came upon the banks of the river Kaveri. He placed the idol on the banks while an utsavam was in progress. When the utsavam got over, the idol refused to move, according to some accounts because Vishnu grew fond of Srirangam. When Vibhishana requested the deity to come along with him, Vishnu refused, but promised to bless Vibhishana by always facing the south (the direction of Lanka, home to Vibhishana). It is due this reason the idol of the deity (in a reclining posture) is believed to face the south. The Chola kings Dharmavarcholan and Killivalavan developed the shrine into the present size of the temple, with the contributions of Tirumangai Alvar. They built the basic foundations and main buildings.

After the rise of the Vijayanagara Empire, the emperor Krishnadevaraya offered his patronage to the city, treating it on par with Tirupati and bequeathing plenty of treasures, jewels and lands to the Srirangam temple. During his period the Srirangam temple was restructured, and many plans were executed for its growth and welfare of the people.

== Geography ==
The Kaveri River diverges at the Upper Anaicut, a dam at the island's westernmost point. The Kollidam River, the first and largest distributary of the Kaveri, flows to the north of the Srirangam Island, while the continuation of the Kaveri flows to the island's south. While the Kollidam continues flowing east past the island unimpeded, the Grand Anaicut dams the Kaveri at the island's eastern end, splitting the river into four streams. One stream flows northeast for a short distance, joining the Kollidam and cutting off Srirangam Island on its eastern end. The island is 19 miles (31 km) in length and 1.5 miles (2.4 km) wide. The town of Srirangam, a prominent Hindu Vaishnavite pilgrimage centre, is located at the centre of this island. Most of the island forms part of the Srirangam zone of the Tiruchirappalli Municipal Corporation and includes the suburbs of Srirangam, Thiruvanaikaval, Srinivasa Nagar and Gitapuram.

== Economy ==
Due to the famous temple, Srirangam has a thriving economy based on tourism. Devotees come from all parts of India and abroad. The number of devotees to the town increases greatly during the festivals like Vaikunta Ekadashi which falls on the Tamil month of Marghazi (Margashirsha).

There are many other famous temples near Srirangam. They include Pillaiyar Rockfort temple, Samayapuram Mariamman temple, Tiruvaanaikovil temple, Vayalur Murugan temple, Uraiyur Vekkali Amman temple, Kattu Alagiya Singar temple etc.

In addition along the banks of Kaveri in areas near Srirangam and Tiruchirappalli there are other famous temples of Vishnu most of which house the reclining form of him, namely the Sri Vadivalagiya Nambi Perumal Temple (Thiru Anbil) and housing the deity Appala Ranganathar, also called the Appukudaththan Temple at Koviladi.

Another temple of Vishnu is at Tiruchirappalli itself, the Alagiya Nambi Temple at Woraiyur which is part of the Sri Ranganathaswamy Temple at Srirangam.

Srirangam town is also home to several hundred people who work in offices and industries located in Tiruchirappalli. The public transport linking Srirangam to Tiruchirappalli (route #1) is very frequent.

== Education ==
There are numerous schools, both private and public, in the town. The Higher Secondary School for Boys was founded in 1896 and is the oldest one in the town. There is also a Higher Secondary School for girls which is almost as old as that of the boys. Sri Vageesha Vidhyashram Senior Secondary School, Srimad Andavan College, Chinmaya Vidyalaya Matric. School, Sri Akilandeswari Vidyalaya, Vignesh Sri Ranga Matriculation School, Sri Vaijayanthi Vidhyalaya etc., are other institutions in Srirangam. Most of the schools have English as a medium of instruction. Some have Tamil as a medium of instruction, and some have both. There are many school children who travel to nearby Tiruchirappalli also. Many schools in Srirangam, offer Sanskrit and Hindi as second languages.

== Transport ==
=== Air ===
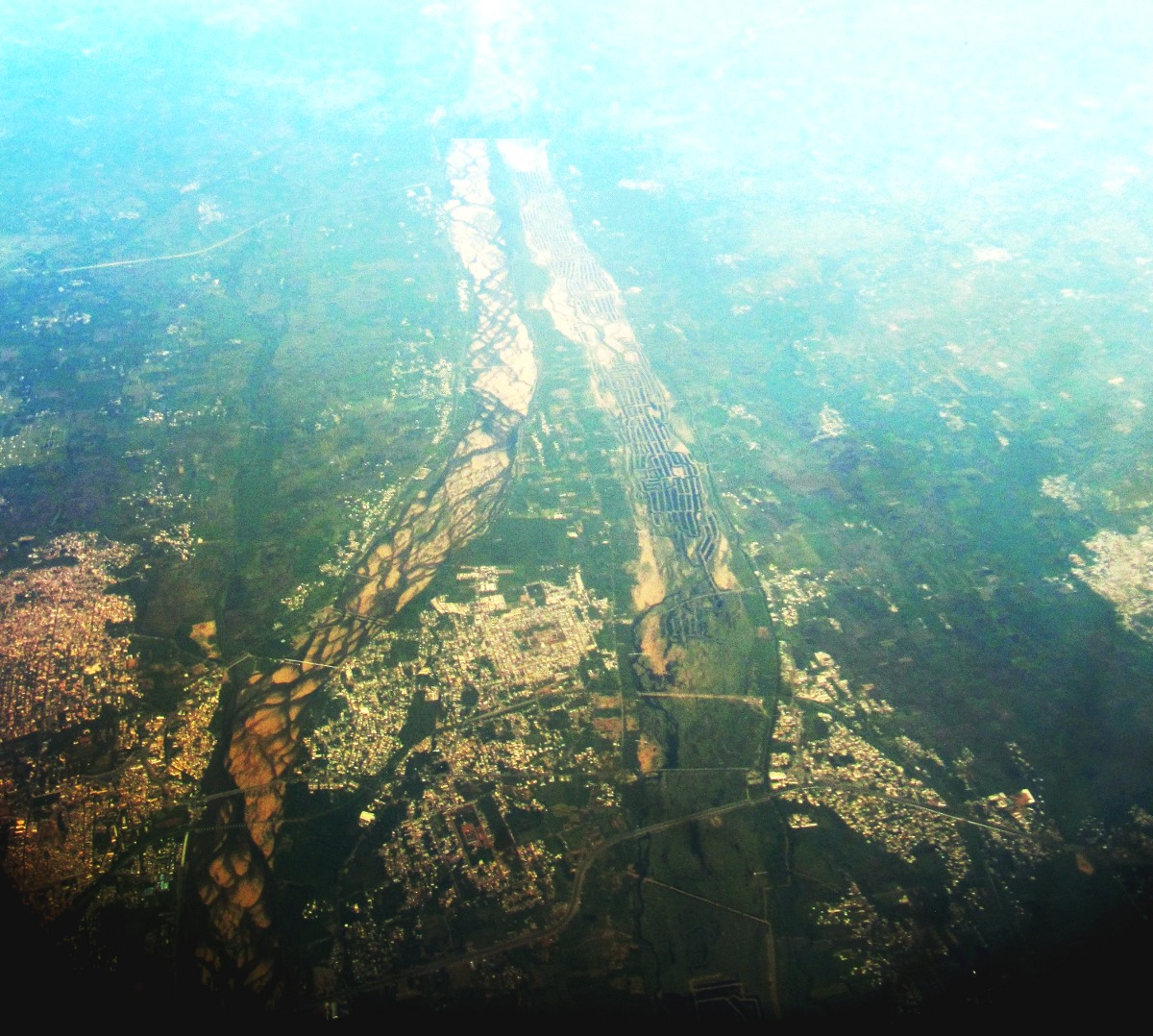
Srirangam as seen from the air

The nearest airport is Tiruchirappalli International Airport. Tiruchirappalli Airport has connections to Chennai, Singapore, Dubai, Sharjah, Colombo, Jaffna, Abu Dhabi, Kuala Lumpur, Dammam, Muscat, Bengaluru, Hyderabad, Cochin.

=== Rail ===
Srirangam Railway Station Name Board

Srirangam has a railway station that can be reached from Chennai through any of the major trains travelling in the Chennai-Kanyakumari railway track and the approximate journey time from Chennai is about 5 hours and 10 minutes (320 km). Only selected trains stop at Srirangam and rest at Tiruchirappalli junction. There is bus service from Tiruchirapalli Junction to Srirangam Temple every 5 minutes throughout the day. At night bus frequency is half an hour.

The Tiruchirappalli fort and Tiruchirapalli Junction which are at a distance of 2 km and 7 km respectively, serve as a connection point to many destinations in southern India, such as Thanjavur, Thiruvananthapuram, Chidambaram, Madurai, Tirupati, Tuticorin, Tenkasi, Rameswaram, Kollam, Bengaluru, Coimbatore, Mysuru, Kochi, Kanyakumari and Mangalore. It also connects cities in the western part of India, such as Pune, Surat, Jodhpur, Bikaner and Ahmedabad, and some North Indian cities like New Delhi and Jammu.

=== Bus ===
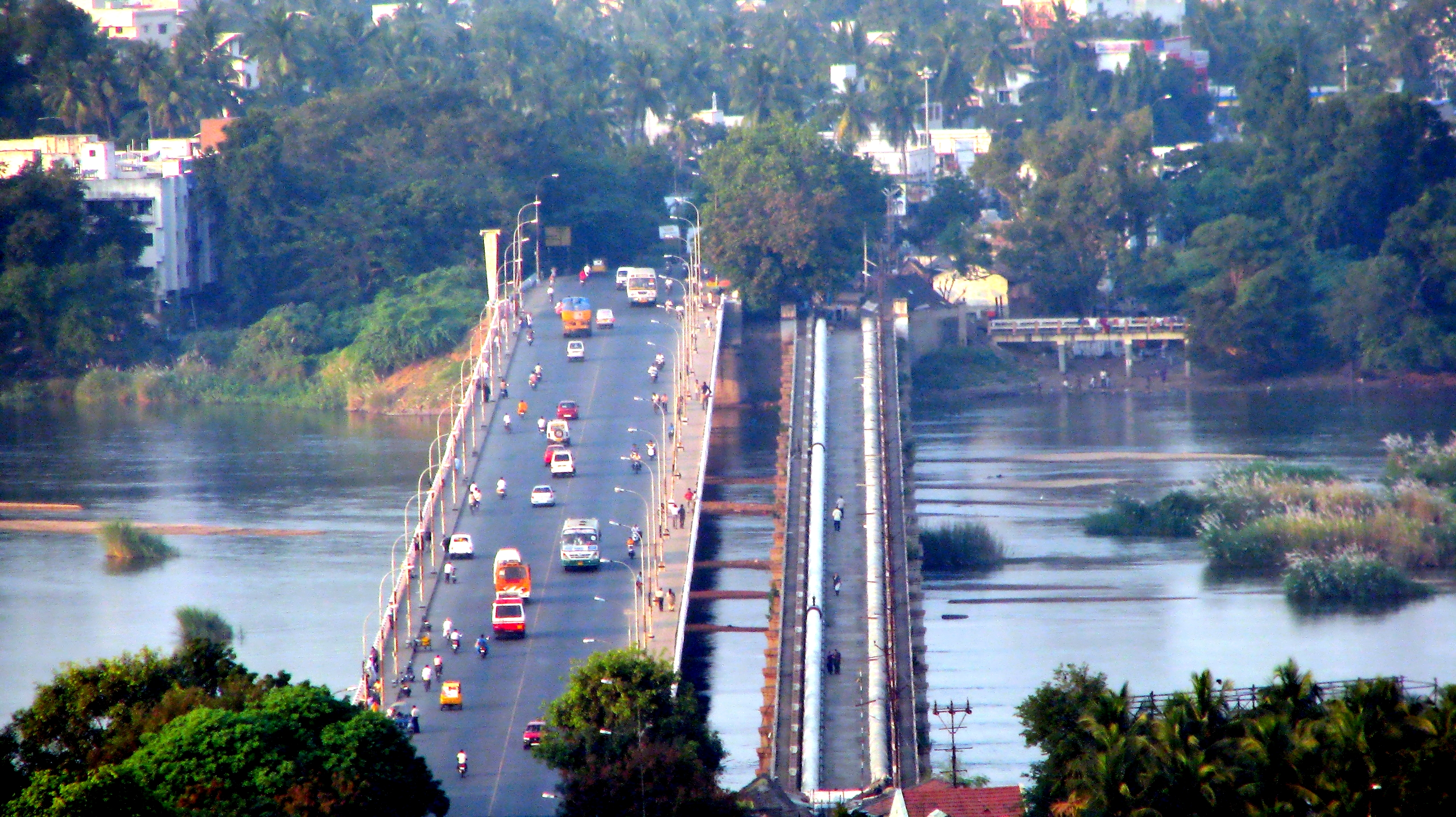
Bridge Connecting Tiruchirappalli and Srirangam across Kaveri River

Tiruchirappalli Central bus stand has direct services to most parts of Tamil Nadu. From the bus stand, tourists can avail of local buses, taxis and autorickshaws to reach Srirangam.

City Bus service to all places of tourist interest from Central Bus Stand and Chinthamani - Main Guard Gate Bus Stand (Both in Tiruchirappalli). Tourist taxis and autorickshaws are also available at reasonable rates.

Route No. 1 of the City bus service runs between Srirangam and Central Bus stand. This route starts from Tiruchirappalli Central Bus Stand and goes via Tiruchirappalli Junction Railway Station, Palakkarai Rettai pillaiyar Kovil street, Main Guard Gate, Chatram Bus Stand, Cauvery River Bridge, Mambazha salai, Thiruvanaikoil and ends at Srirangam Bus Stand near the Srirangam Therkku vaasal (South entrance to the temple).

There is a bus every 5 minutes and the bus service is round the clock.

Buses TNSTC originating from Srirangam to various places like Thiruvananthapuram, Chennai, Madurai, Kodaikanal, etc.

== Climate ==
The climate of Tiruchirappalli (and Srirangam) is Tropical. Average Temperature Range (°C): Summer- Max. 37.1 °C (98.8 °F) Min. 26.4 °C (79.5 °F); Winter- Max. 31.3 °C (88.3 °F) Min. 20.6 °C (69.1 °F); Rainfall: 835 millimetres (32.9 in)

== Politics ==
Srirangam Assembly constituency is a part of the Tiruchirappalli Lok Sabha constituency. The former chief minister of the state Jayalalithaa had represented this constituency. Mutharayar and Brahmins play a major role in Srirangam Assembly constituency, as a majority of voters are from this communities.
