= Jambukeswarar Temple, Thiruvanaikaval =

Temple in Tamil Nadu, India

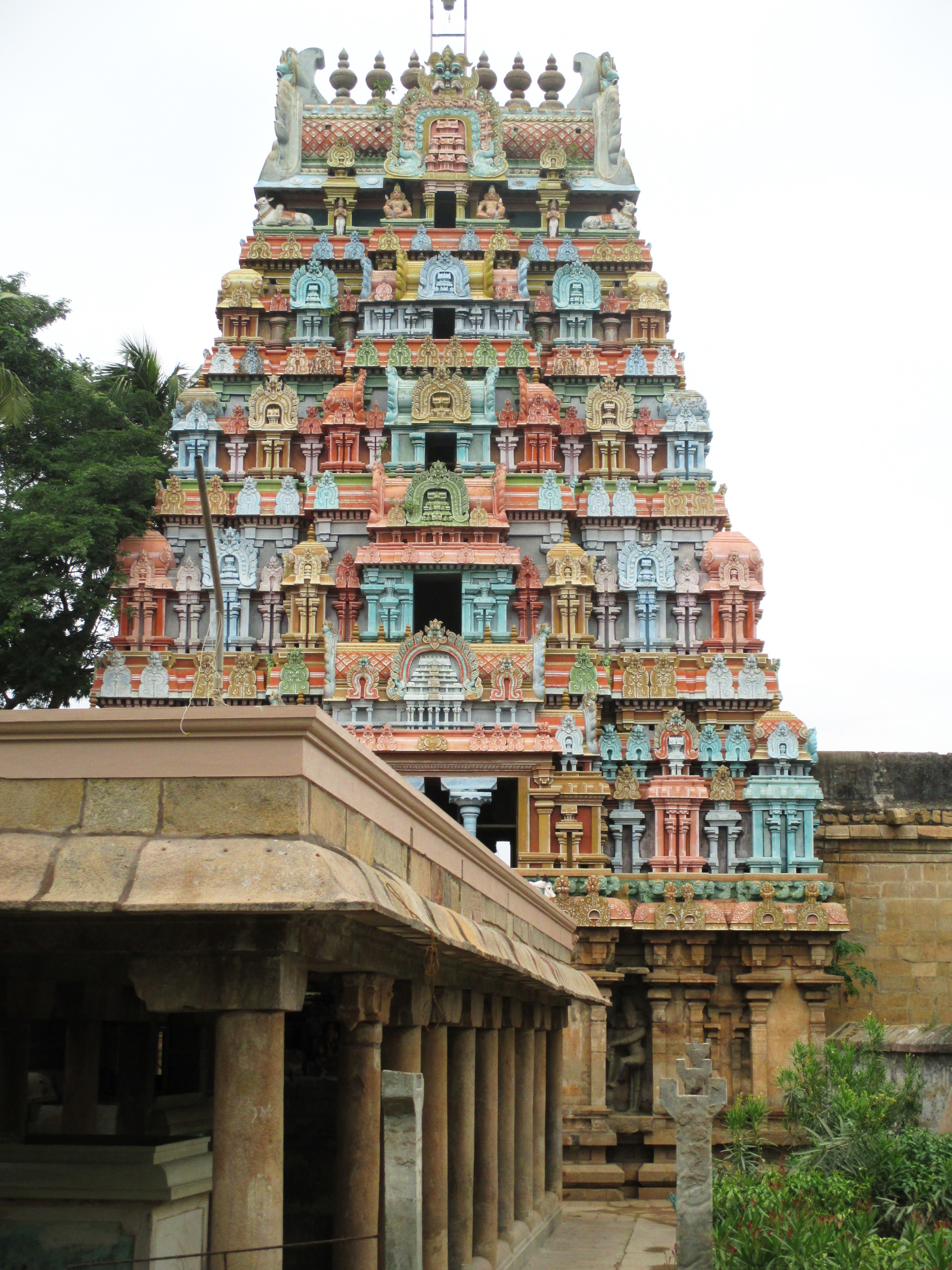

- Location in Tamil Nadu Jambukeswarar Temple, Thiruvanaikaval (India)

Religion
- Affiliation: Hinduism
- Deity: Jambukeshwara (Shiva) Akilandeswari (Parvati)

Location
- Location: Trichy
- State: Tamil Nadu
- Country: India
- Coordinates: 10°51′12″N 78°42′20″E

Architecture
- Type: Tamil Architecture
- Creator: Kochengat Cholan
- Completed: 2nd century AD

Jambukeswarar Temple, Thiruvanaikaval (also Thiruvanaikal, Jambukeswaram) is a temple of Shiva in Tiruchirapalli district, in the state of Tamil Nadu, India. It is one of the five major Shiva Temples of Tamil Nadu representing the Mahābhūta or five elements; this temple represents the element of water, or neer in Tamil. The sanctum of Jambukeswara has an underground stream. In the temple, Shiva is worshipped as Jambukeshwarar and his consort Parvati as Akilandeswari.

It is one of the 275 Paadal Petra Sthalams and has inscriptions from the Chola period.

== Legend ==
Once Parvati mocked Shiva's penance for betterment of the world. Shiva wanted to condemn her act and directed her to go to the earth from Kailasa (Shiva's abode) to do penance. Parvathi in the form of Akilandeswari as per Shiva's wish found Jambu forest (Thiruvanaikoil) to conduct her penance. She made a lingam out of water of river Cauvery (also called as river Ponni) under the Venn Naaval tree (the Venn Naaval tree on top of the saint Jambu) and commenced her worship. The lingam is known as Appu Lingam (Water Lingam). Siva at last gave darshan to Akilandeswari and taught her Siva Gnana. Akilandeswari took Upadesa (lessons) facing East from Shiva, who stood facing west.

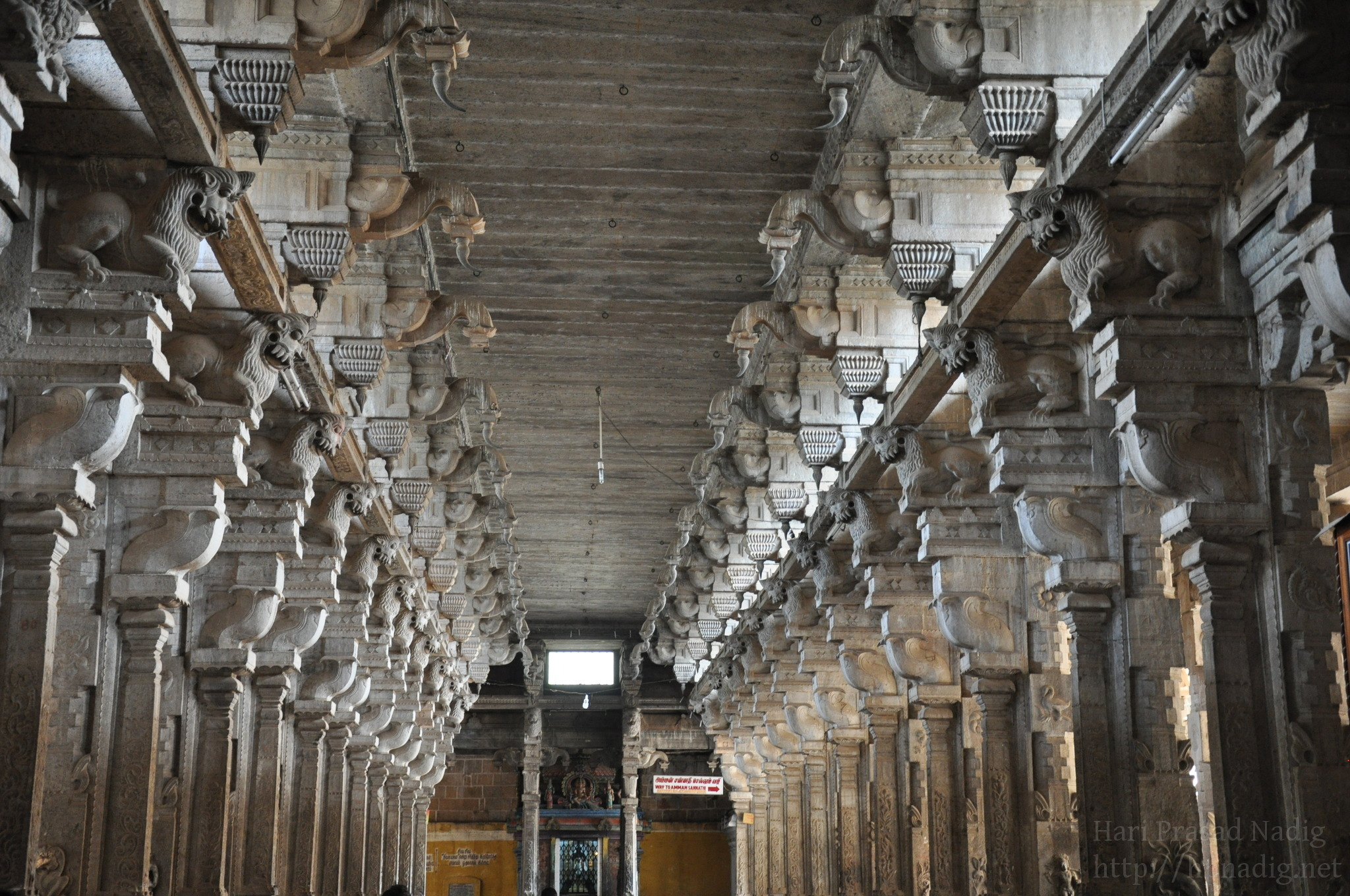
The second precinct of the temple with pillars.

There were two Shivaganas (Shiva's army who live in Kailash): 'Malyavan' and 'Pushpadanta'. Though they are Siva Ganas they always quarrel with each other and fight for one thing or other. In one fight 'Malyavan' cursed 'Pushpadanta' to become an elephant on earth and the latter cursed the former to become a spider on earth. The elephant and the spider came to Thiruvanaikaval and continued their Siva worship. The elephant collected water from river Cauvery and conducted ablution to the lingam under the Jambu tree (Eugenia jambolana, the java plum tree) daily. The spider constructed his web over the lingam to prevent dry leaves from dropping on it and prevent sunlight directly falling on it. When the elephant saw the web and thought it was dust on lingam. The elephant tore them and cleaned the lingam by pouring water and the practice continued daily. The spider became angry one day and crawled into the trunk of the elephant and bit the elephant to death, killing itself. Siva, in the form of Jambukeswara, moved by the deep devotion of the two, relieved them from the curse. As an elephant worshipped Siva here, this place came to be known as Thiru Aanai Kaa (thiru means holy, aanai is elephant, kaa (kaadu) means forest). Later the name 'Thiruaanaikaa' become 'Thiruvanaikaval' and 'Thiruvanaikoil'.

As an outcome of having committed a sin by killing the elephant, in the next birth, the spider was born as the King Kochengot Chola (kotchengannan cholan meaning red-eyed king) and built 70 temples and this temple is the one among them. The account of the Chola building seventy temples along with this temple is mentioned in Nalayira Divya Prabandham. Remembering his enmity with the elephant in his previous birth, he built the Siva Sannathi (sanctorum) such that not even a small elephant can enter. The entrance on the sanctorum of Jambukeswara is only 1.2 metres (4 ft) high and 0.76 metres (2.5 ft) wide.

== Architecture ==
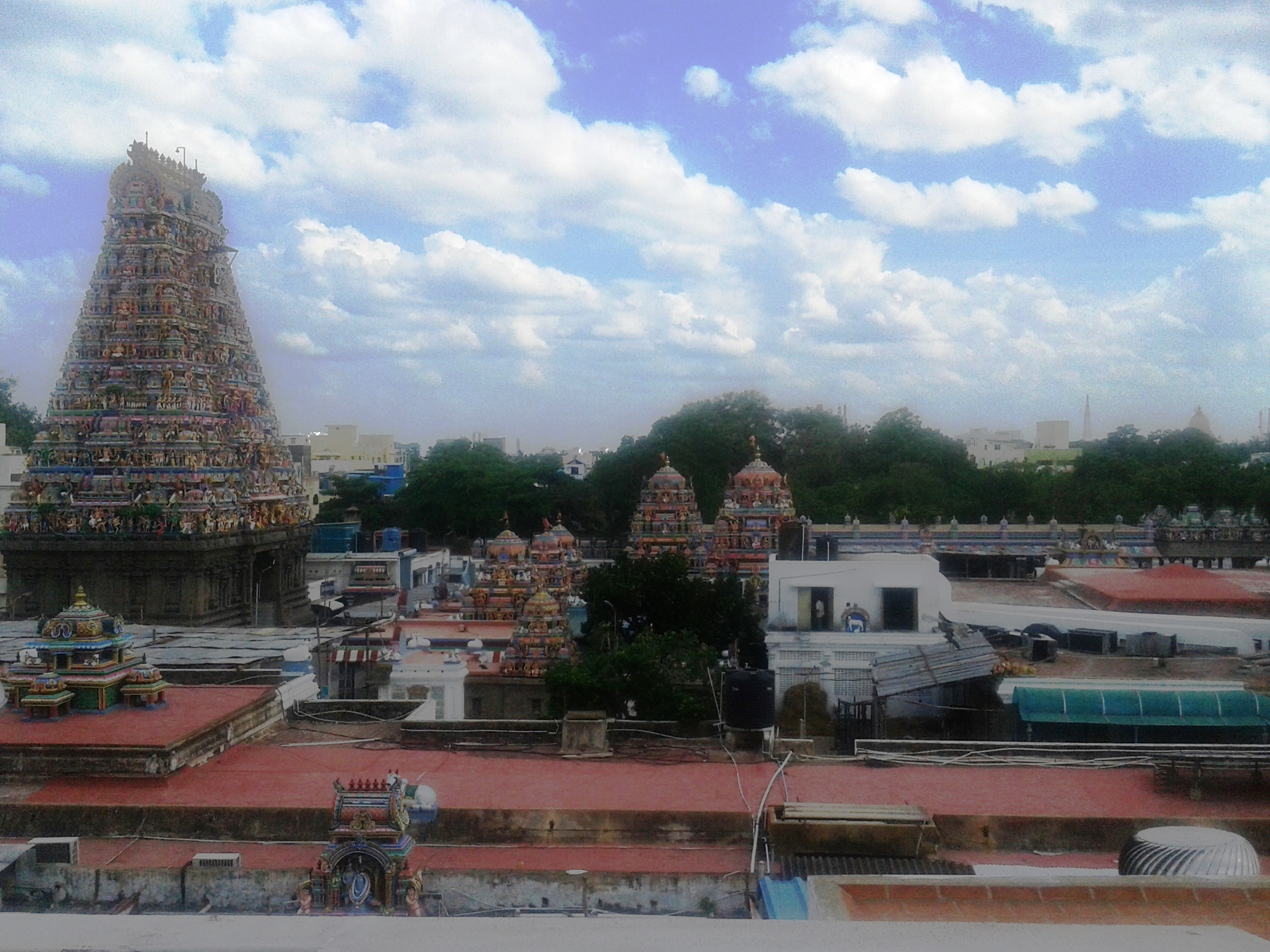
View of the temple Complex

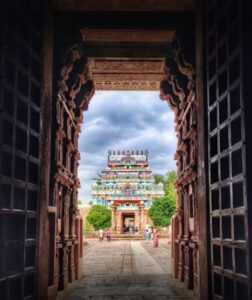
View of the temple entrance

The massive outer wall covering the fifth precinct, known as the Vibudi Prakara, stretches over 1.6 kilometres (1 mi) and is 0.61 metres (2 ft) thick and over 7.6 metres (25 ft) high. Legend maintains that the wall was built by Shiva himself, disguised as a laborer and working with the human laborers. The fourth precinct contains a hall with 796 pillars and measures 742 metres (2,436 ft) by 455 metres (1,493 ft). It also has a small tank fed by perpetual springs. The third enclosure is 227 metres (745 ft) by 60 metres (197 ft) surrounded a wall 9.1 metres (30 ft) high. This area has two gopurams (gateway towers) 22 metres (73 ft) and 30 metres (100 ft) tall, a coconut thoppu and a small water tank. The second enclosure is 93 metres (306 ft) by 60 metres (197 ft), a gopuram 20 metres (65 ft) high and several small shrines. The inner most enclosure measuring 38 metres (126 ft) by 37 metres (123 ft) has the sanctum.

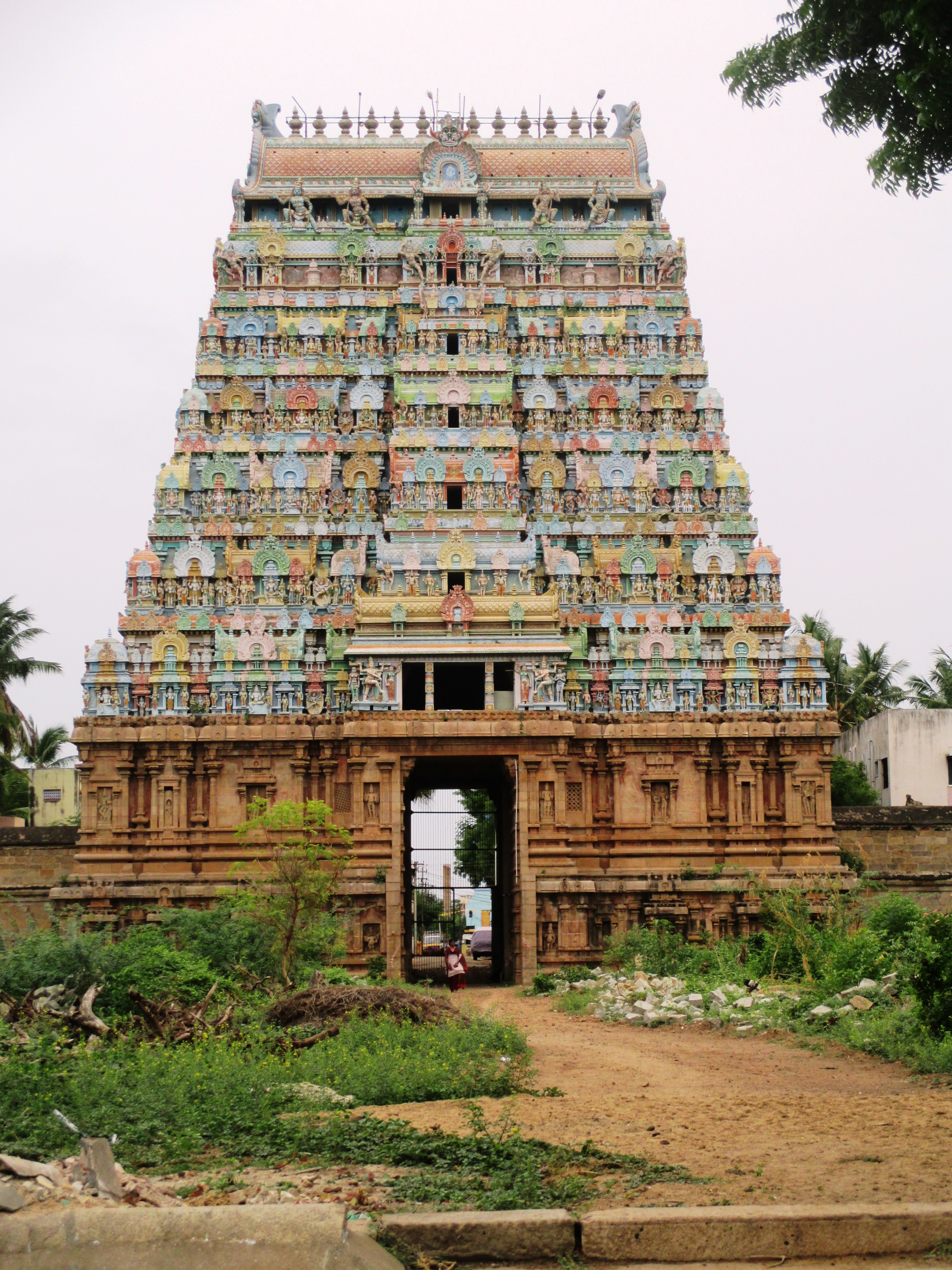
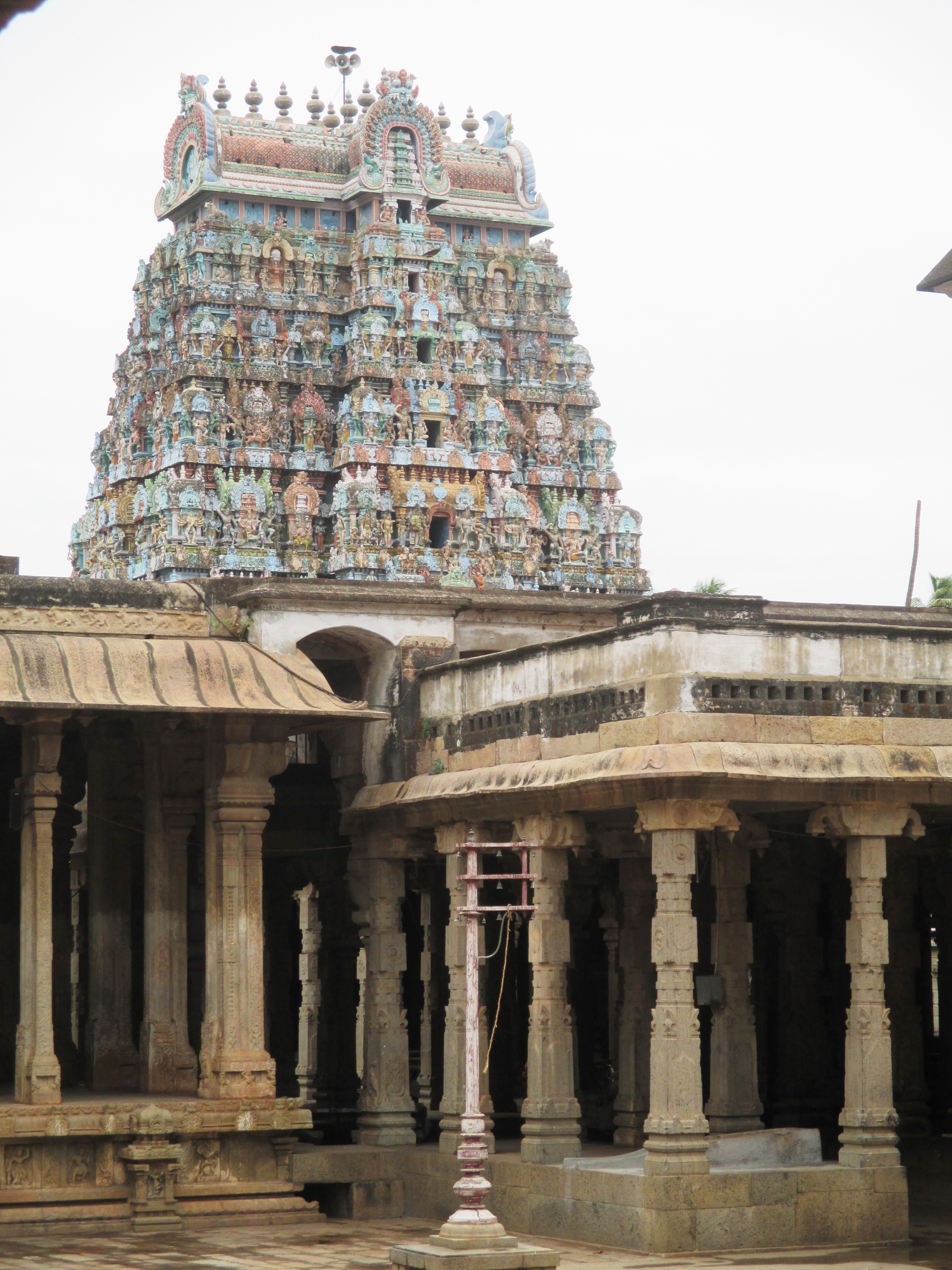
Images of various gateway towers in the temple

The sanctum sanctorum is a square structure, found independently situated at the center of the innermost enclosure. There is a vimana on the roof of the sanctum. The structure is open on three sides, with a shallow moat separating it from the circumambulatory path of the innermost enclosure. The sthala-vriksham, or holy tree here is the White Jambuka (Tamil: வெண் நாவல் மரம்) (Syzygium cumini), found growing along the south-eastern wall of the sanctum sanctorum. The trunk of the tree is protected by a walled structure. The western side of the sanctum, from where the deity is viewed, is continuous with a large closed hall, the Mukha Mantapa, containing four-pillars and housing a bronze idol of Nandi. The Mukha Mantapa has a large, ornate western door gilded with silver that forms the principal entrance. There are two additional entrances to the Mukha Mantapa on the southern and North Eastern sides as well. A set of three steps descend to the level of the sanctum sanctorum from the Mukha Mantapa. The deity is viewed through a stone window that forms an integral part of the western face of the sanctum sanctorum. The window has nine viewing apertures, believed to represent the Navagraha. There is a panel in bas-relief over the window depicting the sthala puranam: The jambuka tree growing out of the meditating sage Jambu's head on the extreme right; the linga of Jambukeswarar under the tree; a spider and an elephant worshiping the linga along with the Goddess Parvati who stands to the left of the linga. The sanctum sanctorum is divided into the Ardha Mantapam or Antaralam (whose western wall bears the window) and the Garbha Griha where the deity of Jambukeswarar is housed. Entrance into the Sanctum is through a small door on the southern wall, about 1.2 metres (4 ft) in height. The Ardha Mantapa is about 1.2 metres (4 ft) X 1.2 metres (4 ft) and contains an idol of Goddess Parvati on the right side of the door to the Garbha Griha. Devotees are admitted in groups of six into the Ardha Mantapa during sevas like Abhishekam or on payment of a small fee. The Garbha Griha is a wider structure compared to the Ardha Mantapa. At the center, the Brahma Sthana, is the self-manifested linga of Jambukeswarar. The upper conical part of the linga is of the color of copper, whereas the yoni-bhaga or the pedestal is of black granite. A brass ring is seen at the point of attachment of the linga to the pedestal. The height of the linga is about 0.91 metres (3 ft) from the floor of the sanctum. The Garbha Griha and the Ardha Mantapa are unadorned from the inside, the only source of illumination within the sanctum being ghee lamps. A stream of water (a water spring from the Kaveri river) emerges from the linga, which is usually demonstrated as the soaking wet clothes in which it is draped. The water flow increases significantly during the Monsoon. The main deity of the temple is Jambukeswara, representing the element water. Jambukeswara is depicted sitting under a jambu tree, which grows over a small stream that engulfs the deity during the rainy season. The temple is also considered the abode of goddess Akilandeswari, one of the forms of the goddess Parvati. The greatest of works related to this temple include Tiruvanaikaval and Kilvelur Akshyalingaswamy temple.

=== Goddess Akilandeshwari's shrine ===
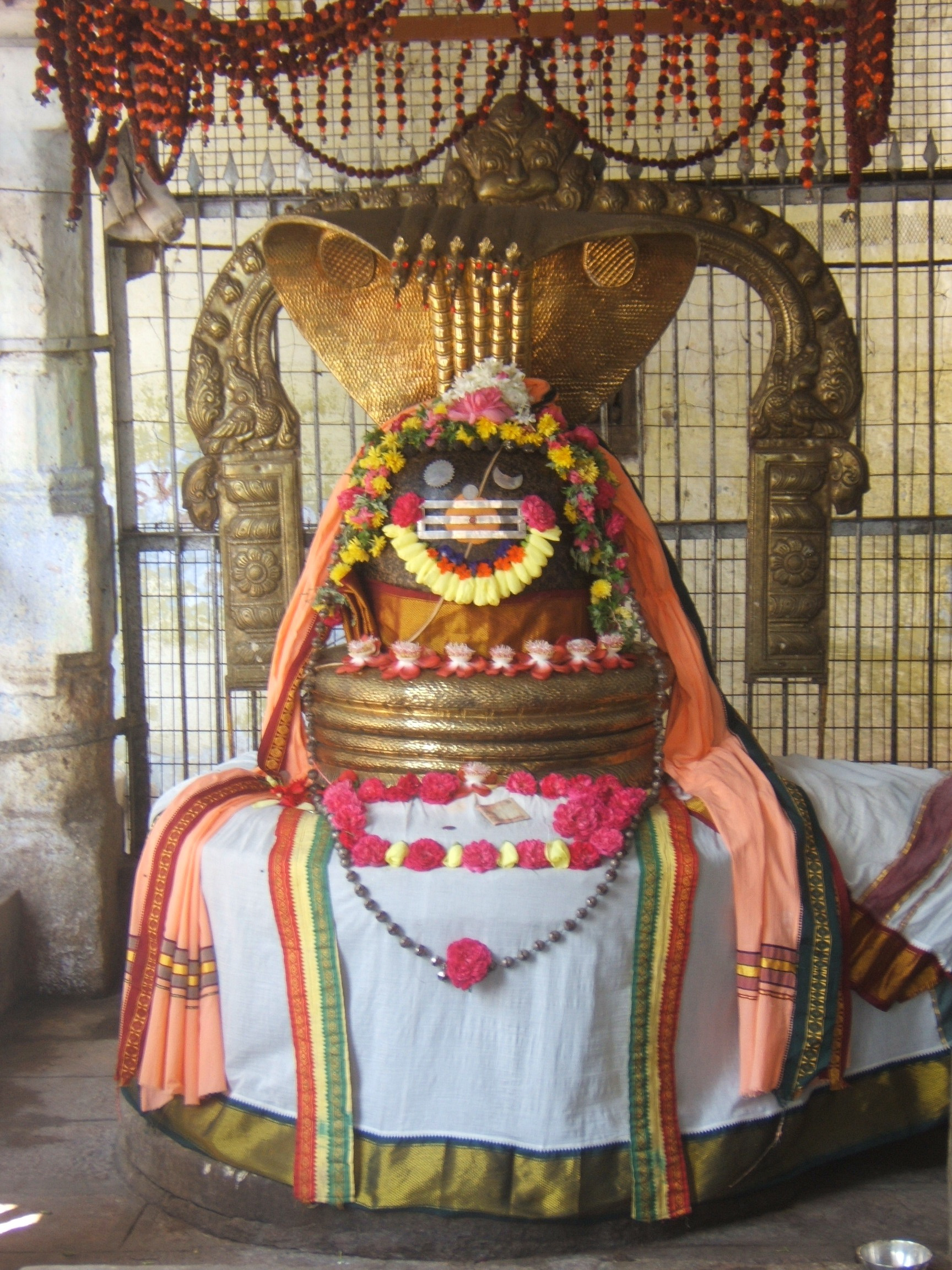
A lingam inside the temple

The temples idols are installed opposite to each other - Such temples are known as Upadesa Sthalams. As Akhilandeshwari (Parvati) was like a student and Jambukeswara (Shiva) like a Guru (teacher) in this temple, there is no Thiru Kalyanam (marriage) conducted in this temple for Shiva and Parvathi, unlike the other Shiva temples. The sanctum of the goddess Akilandeshwari and the sanctum of Prasanna Vinayaka are in the shape of the pranava manthra called "Aum" in Tamil script. It is believed that the Amman in the temple was in deep anger hence during one of Adi Shankara's visits he installed the Prasanna Ganapathy idol right opposite to her sanctum and installed a pair of Sri Chakra thaatankas (ear-rings) to reduce her anger.

The sculpture of Ekapada Trimurti, an aspect of Shiva with the deities Vishnu and Brahma emerging from it, is present in the temple, which can be seen only in Thyagaraja Temple, Tiruvottiyur.

There are lot of inscriptions from various Chola kings from 11th - 12th century indicating grants to the temple. The temple was widely expanded by Hoysala king, Someswara, the son of Vira Narasimha. During 1236-37 CE, he built a lot of shrines namely Vallaliswara, Padumalisvara, Vira Narasingeswara and Somleswara evidently named after his grandfather Ballalla II, grandmother Padmaladevei, father Vira Narasimha and aunt Somala Devi. The 7-tiered rajagopuram is also believed to have constructed by the Hoysala king. There are separate shrines beyond the temple compound namely Aadhi having a typical structure as the main shrines. The temple and its pagodas were subject to frequent conquest between French and English forces between 1751 and 1755 CE. The temple is being widely maintained by Vellalars and the Nattukottai Nagarathars during the 19th and early 20th centuries.

== Religious significance ==
Pancha Bhoota Sthalam (Sanskrit: पञ्चभूतस्थलानि Pañcabhūtasthalāni) refers to the five Shiva temples, each representing the manifestation of the five prime elements of nature - space, air, fire, water, earth. Pancha indicates five, Bhoota means elements and Sthala means place. All these temples are located in South India with four of these temples at Tamil Nadu and one at Andhra Pradesh. The five elements are believed to be enshrined in the five lingams and each of the lingams representing Shiva in the temple have five different names based on the elements they represent. In the Thiruvaanaikaval temple, Shiva is said to have manifested himself in the form of water (Appu Lingam). The other four manifestations are Prithivi Lingam (representing land) at Ekambareswarar Temple, Akasa Lingam (representing sky) at Thillai Nataraja Temple, Chidambaram, Agni Lingam (representing fire) at Annamalaiyar Temple and Vayu Lingam (representing air) at Srikalahasti Temple.

== Culture ==
In the third enclosure, there is a coconut grove having a small tank where the processional idol of the neighbouring Sriranganathaswamy Temple was used to be brought one day a year. As the goddess Akhilandeshwari worshipped her husband Lord Shiva in this temple, even today at noon the 'Archakar' (chief priest) dresses like a female and does puja to Jambukeswara and Cow. The noon pooja is very famous and a host of pilgrims attend it every day. A special variety of black cow, called Karum Pasu is used for the occasion. Annabhishekam to lingam (ablution with cooked rice) is a daily ritual performed in the temple. The temple is one of the hosts for the annual Natyanjali, a festival of classical Indian dance. The temple has also a school for training nadhaswaram, a classical pipe instrument in Tamil Nadu.

There is a legend that Parvati as Akhilandeshwari worshipped Shiva here and installed the idol in the sanctum. Following the legend, a priest performs the pooja every day. It is believed that the saint Adi Shankara offered ear rings with a Sri Yantra carving on it to goddess Akhilandeshwari. There are a total of nine waterbodies associated with the temple.

Muthuswamy Dikshitar, the 18th century composer of Carnatic music, is said to have composed a song on the presiding deity of Jambukeshwar and three songs on the presiding deity of Akhilandeshwari in the Jambukeshwarar Temple here.

Kriti	Raga	Tala
Jambupathe Mam Pahi	Yamunakalyani	Tisra Ekam
Akhilandeshwari Rakshamam	Dwijavanti	Adi tala
Akhilandeshwaryai Namaste	Arabhi	Adi tala
Sri Mataha Shiva Vamanke	Begada	Adi tala

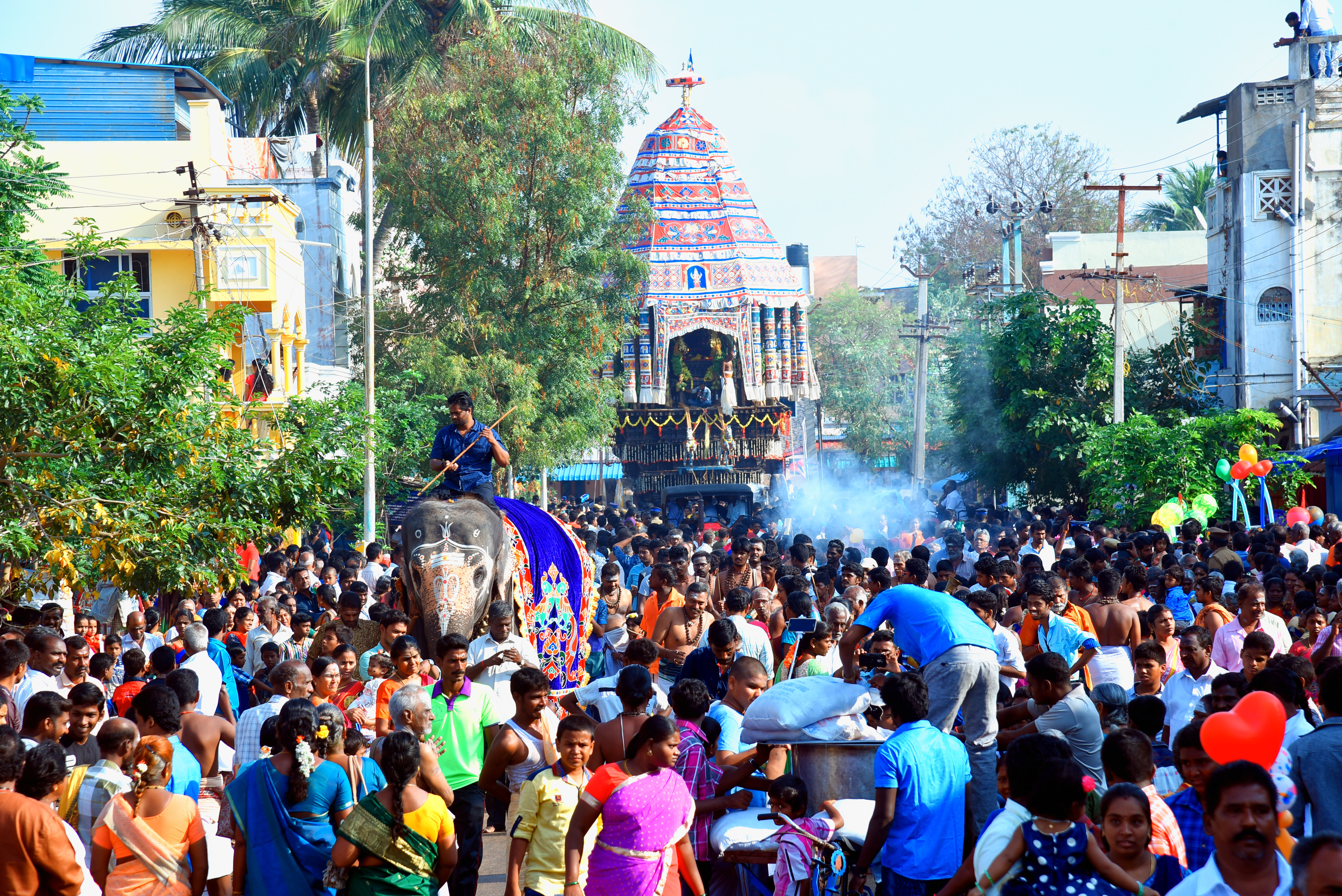
The Thiruvanaikaval Ther (Car festival), carrying the processional idol of Jambukeswarar.

== Administration ==
The temple is maintained and administered by the Hindu Religious and Charitable Endowments Department of the Government of Tamil Nadu.

== Gallery ==
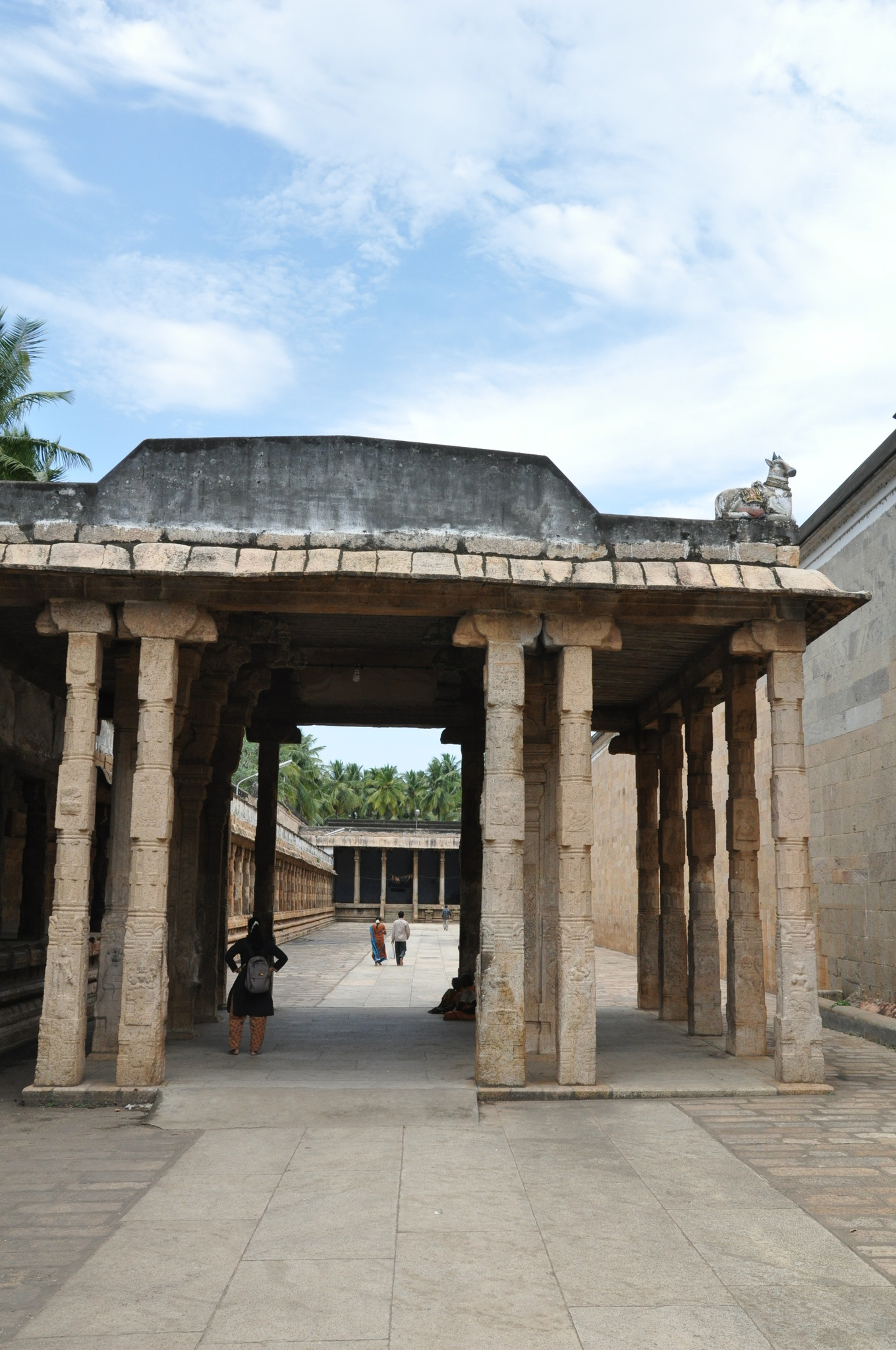
The second precinct of the temple

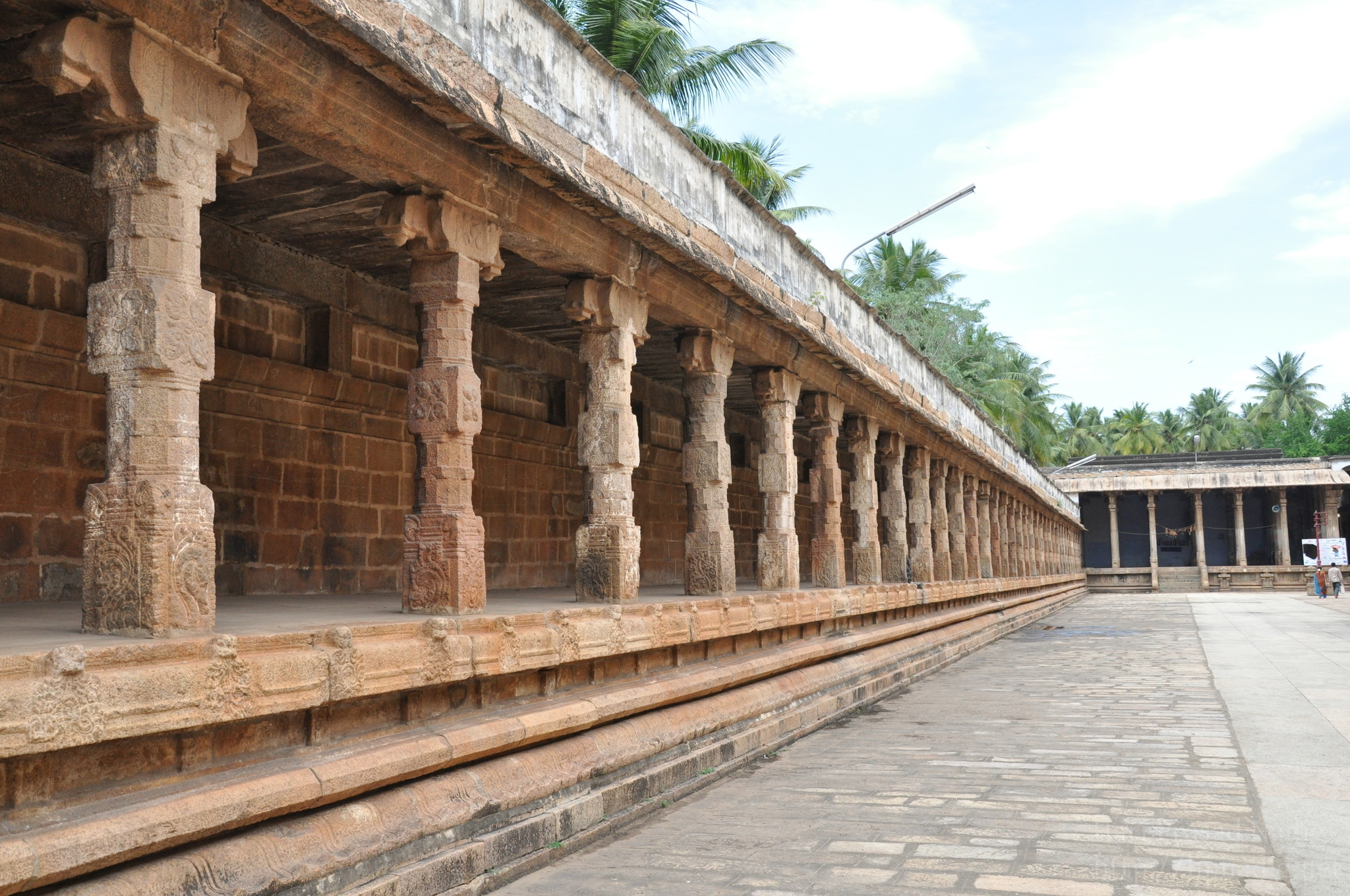
The second precinct of the temple

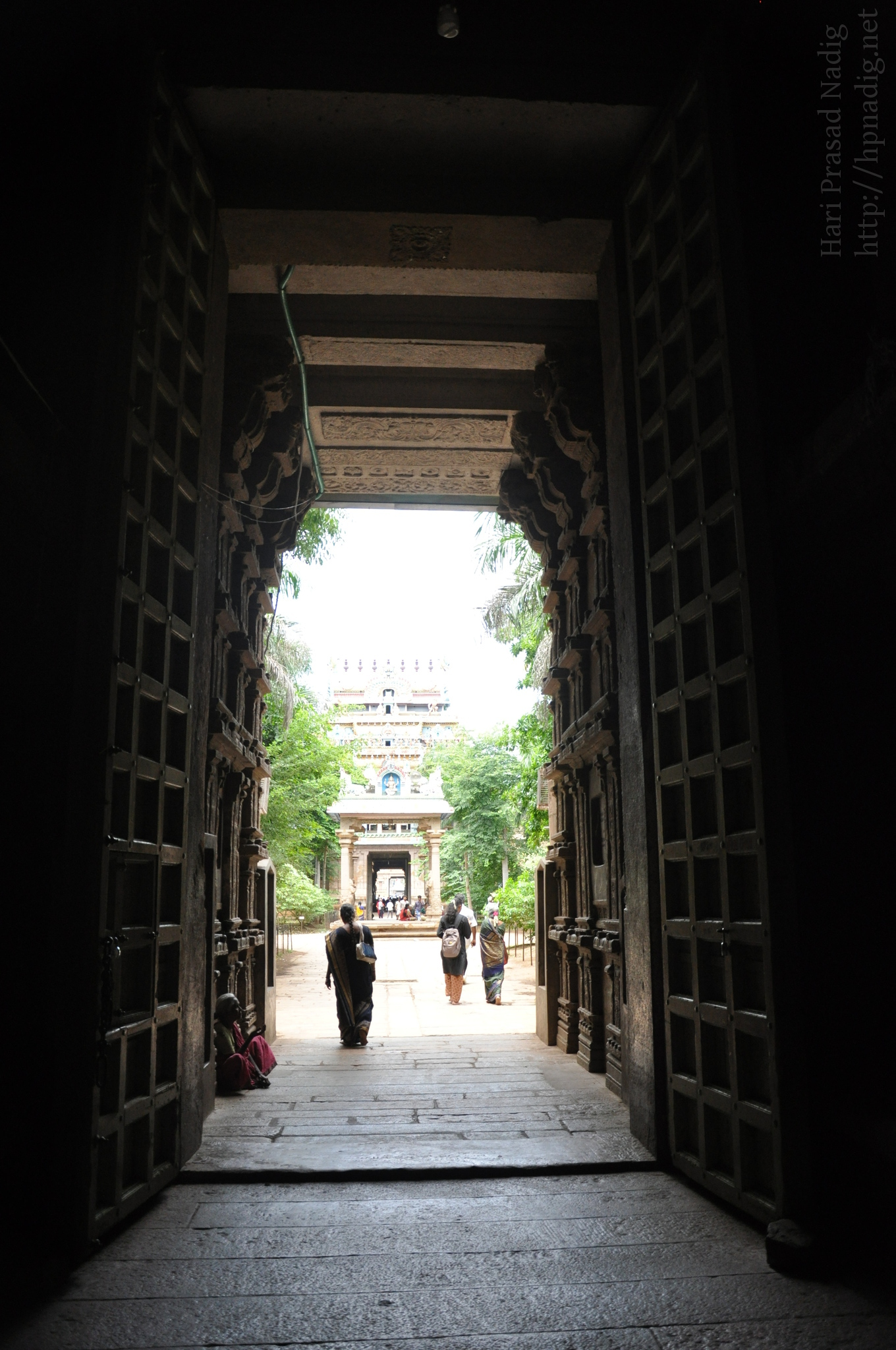
The gateway of the temple

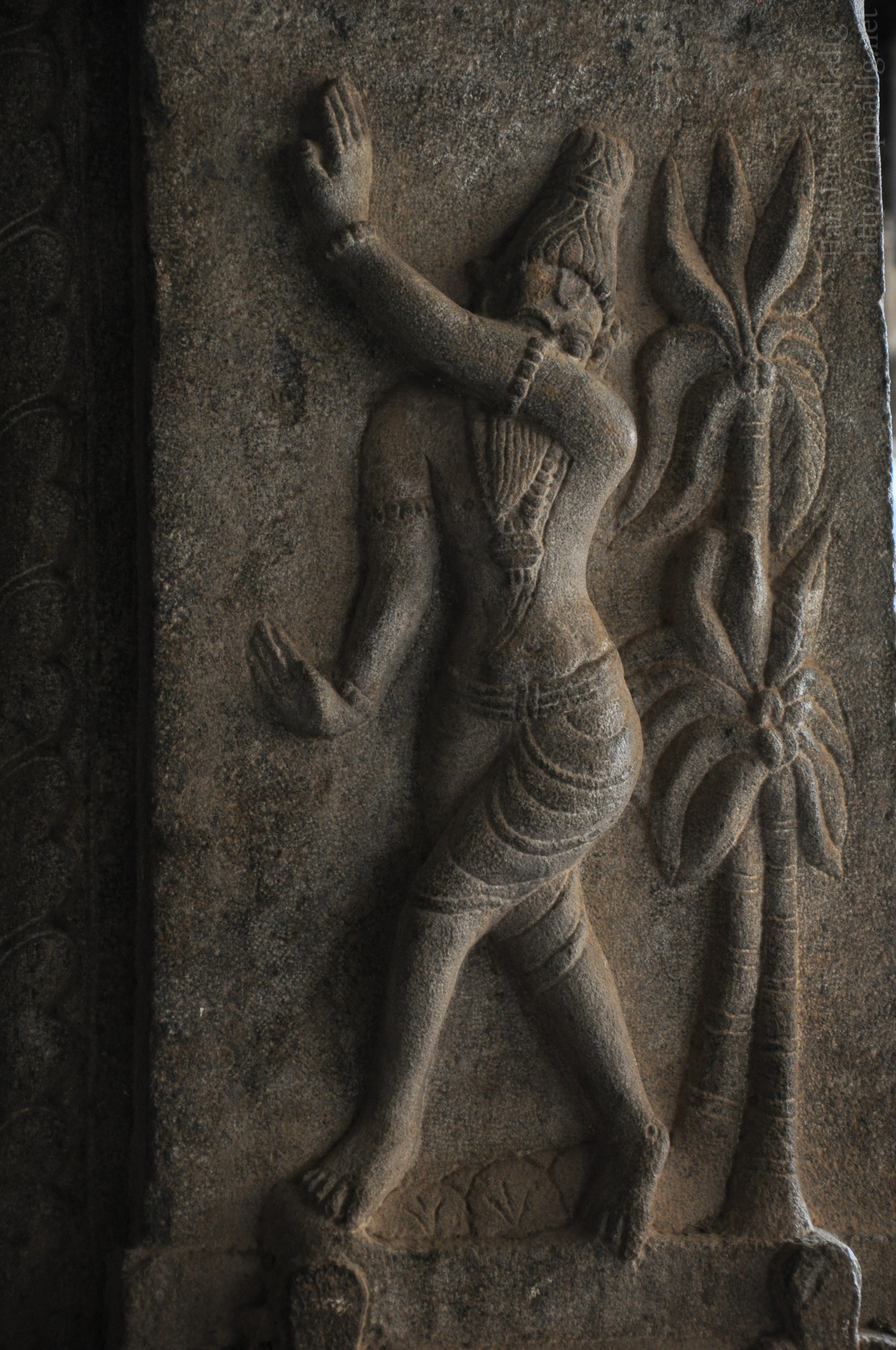
A sculpture inside the walls of the temple

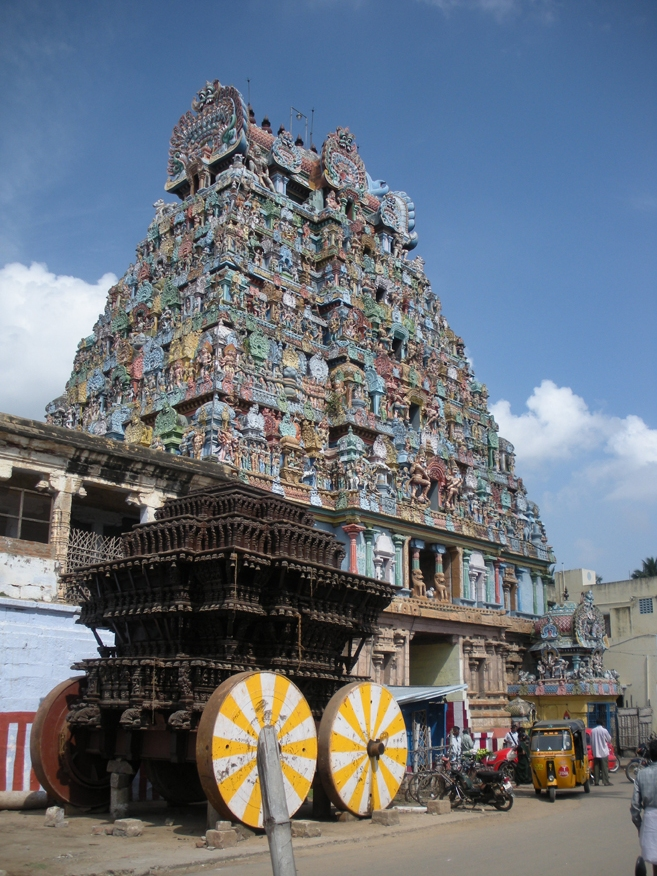
The Towering Rajagopuram with one of the Temple Cars

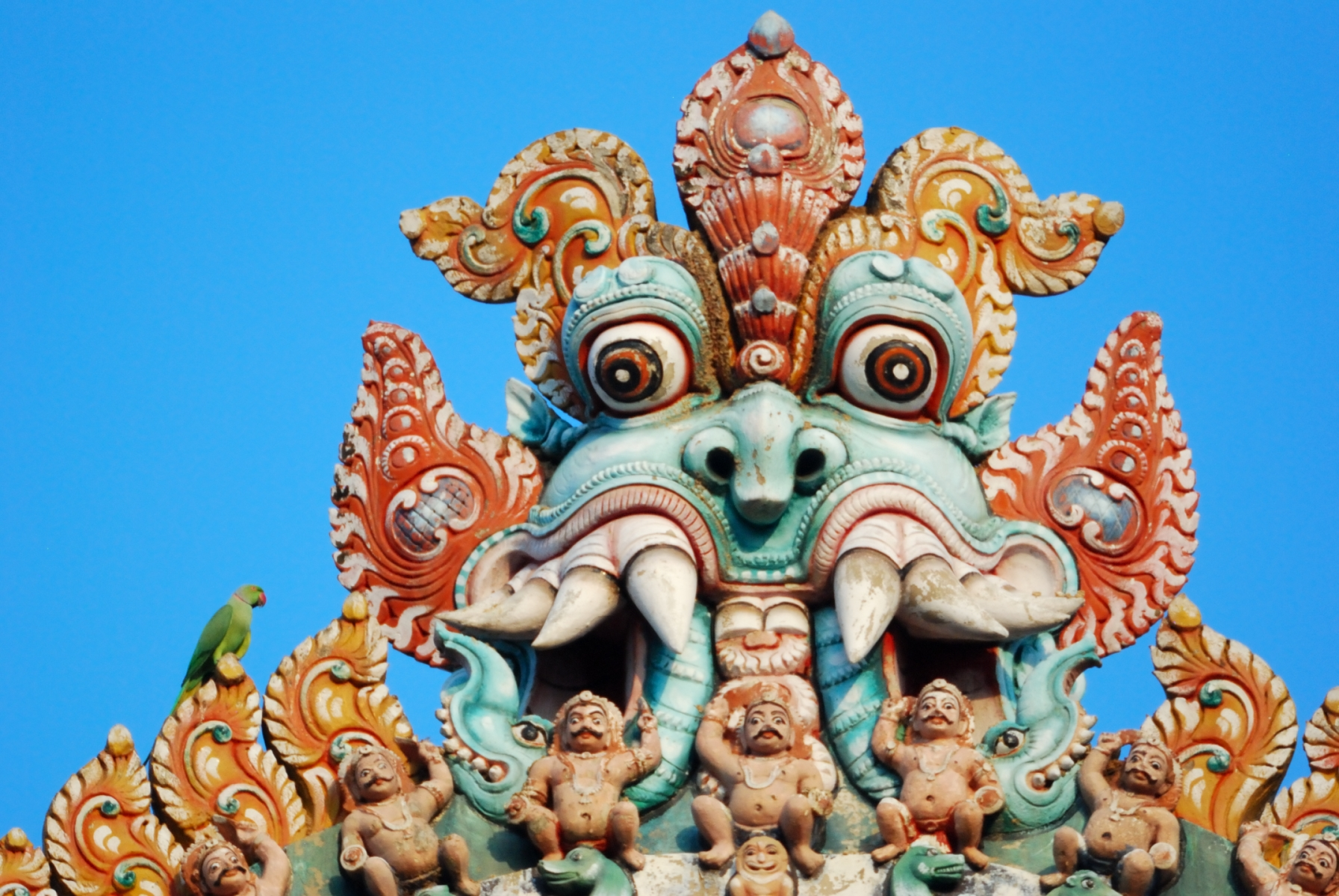
Thiruvanaikaval Kirtimukha top of gopuram with a ring-necked parakeet sitting next to it
