= Thiruvanaikaval =

Thiruvaanaikaaval திருவானைக்காவல் Thiruvanaikovil Paadal Petra Sthalam
- Neighbourhood
- Nickname: Aanaikaaval
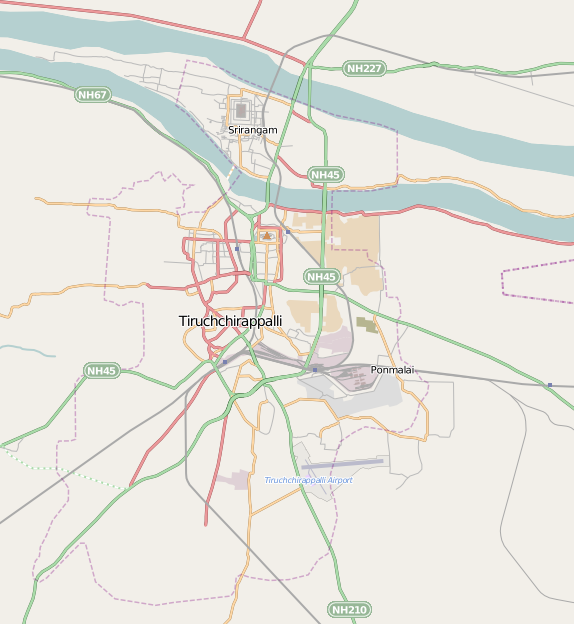
- Location in Tiruchirapalli
- Coordinates: 10°51′09″N 78°42′23″E
- Country: India
- State: Tamil Nadu
- Time zone: UTC+5.30 (IST)
- Postal code: 620005

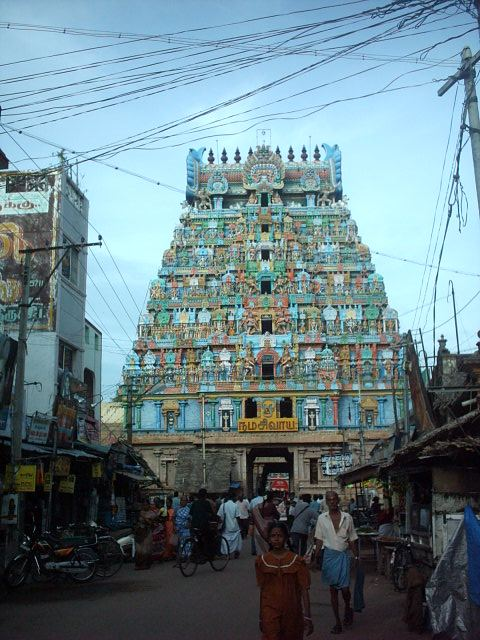
Shri Jambukeshwarar Temple

Thiruvaanaikaaval Paadal Petra Sthalam (திருவானைக்காவல்) or Thiruvaanaikaaval is a neighbourhood in the city of Tiruchirappalli in Tamil Nadu, India. It is situated on the northern banks of the Kaveri river, on the Srirangam Island.

== Description ==
The island Srirangam is surrounded by the Kaveri river to the south and the Kollidam river to the north. The Kollidam is the northern distributary of the Kaveri River. The Shri Jambukeshwarar Temple is located here. The temple's presiding deity is Lord Shiva (Jambukeshwara) and the goddess is Shri Akhilandeshwari. It is revered as one of the Pancha Bhōōta Sthalam (The Five Elements). whereas Water is the presiding element in the temple. There is a freshwater spring underneath the Shiva Linga. It is believed that the jamun fruit will be ripening every day from the tree in the temple and the same will be served for the deity as the first offering (prasadam). Adi Shankara is said to have visited this shrine and has done the Tatankya (Ear Rings) Pratishtha for the goddess to ensure that she remains in a Sowmya Rūpa (Peaceful form). The king who built the temple gave wages to his sculptors for building the fifth Prakara of the shrine by way of Vibhuti instead of gold coins. The entrance of the garbhagriha (sanctum-sanctorum) is so small that an elephant cannot enter inside. The Sthala Vriksha (presiding tree) is the Jamun tree. Like the Meenakshi Temple in Madurai and the Kamakshi Amman Temple in Kanchipuram, Akhilandeshwari is famous in this temple.

== In popular culture ==
Muthuswamy Dikshitar, the 18th century composer of Carnatic music, is said to have composed a song on the presiding deity of Jambukeshwar and three songs on the presiding deity of Akhilandeshwari in the Jambukeshwarar Temple here.

Kriti	Raga	Tala
Jambupathe Mam Pahi	Yamunakalyani	Tisra Ekam
Akhilandeshwari Rakshamam	Dwijavanti	Adi tala
Akhilandeshwaryai Namaste	Arabhi	Adi tala
Sri Mataha Shiva Vamanke	Begada	Adi tala
