= Gitapuram =

Gitapuram (Tamil: கீதாபுரம்) is a neighbourhood in the Srirangam zone of the city of Tiruchirappalli. It is located within Srirangam Island.
