= Srirangam Island =

River island in Tiruchirappalli, Tamil Nadu, India

Coordinates: 10°52′N 78°41′E

Srirangam Island is a river island in the city of Tiruchirappalli, in the Indian state of Tamil Nadu. The island is formed by the Kaveri and Kollidam Rivers.

== Geography ==
The Kaveri River diverges at the Upper Anaicut, a dam at the island's westernmost point. The Kollidam River, the first and largest distributary of the Kaveri, flows to the north of the island, while the continuation of the Kaveri flows to the island's south. While the Kollidam continues flowing east past the island unimpeded, the Grand Anaicut dams the Kaveri at the island's eastern end, splitting the river into four streams. One stream flows northeast for a short distance, joining the Kollidam and cutting off Srirangam Island on its eastern end. The island is 19 miles (31 km) in length and 1.5 miles (2.4 km) wide. The town of Srirangam, a prominent Hindu Vaishnavite pilgrimage centre, is located at the centre of this island. Most of the island forms part of the Srirangam zone of the Tiruchirappalli Municipal Corporation and includes the suburbs of Srirangam, Thiruvanaikaval, Srinivasa Nagar and Gitapuram.
