= Srinivasa Iyengar =

Srinivasa Iyengar may refer to:

- K. R. Srinivasa Iyengar (1908–1999), Indian writer in English and Vice Chancellor of Andhra University
- P. T. Srinivasa Iyengar (1863-1931), Indian historian, linguist and educationist
- S. Srinivasa Iyengar (1874-1941), Indian lawyer, freedom-fighter and politician from the Indian National Congress
- Srinivasa Iyengar Ramanujan (1887-1920), Indian mathematician
- Srinivasa Iyengar (civil engineer)
