= Srikalahasteeswara temple =

Shiva temple in Tirupati, India

Sri Gnanaprasunambika sametha Srikalahasteeswara Temple
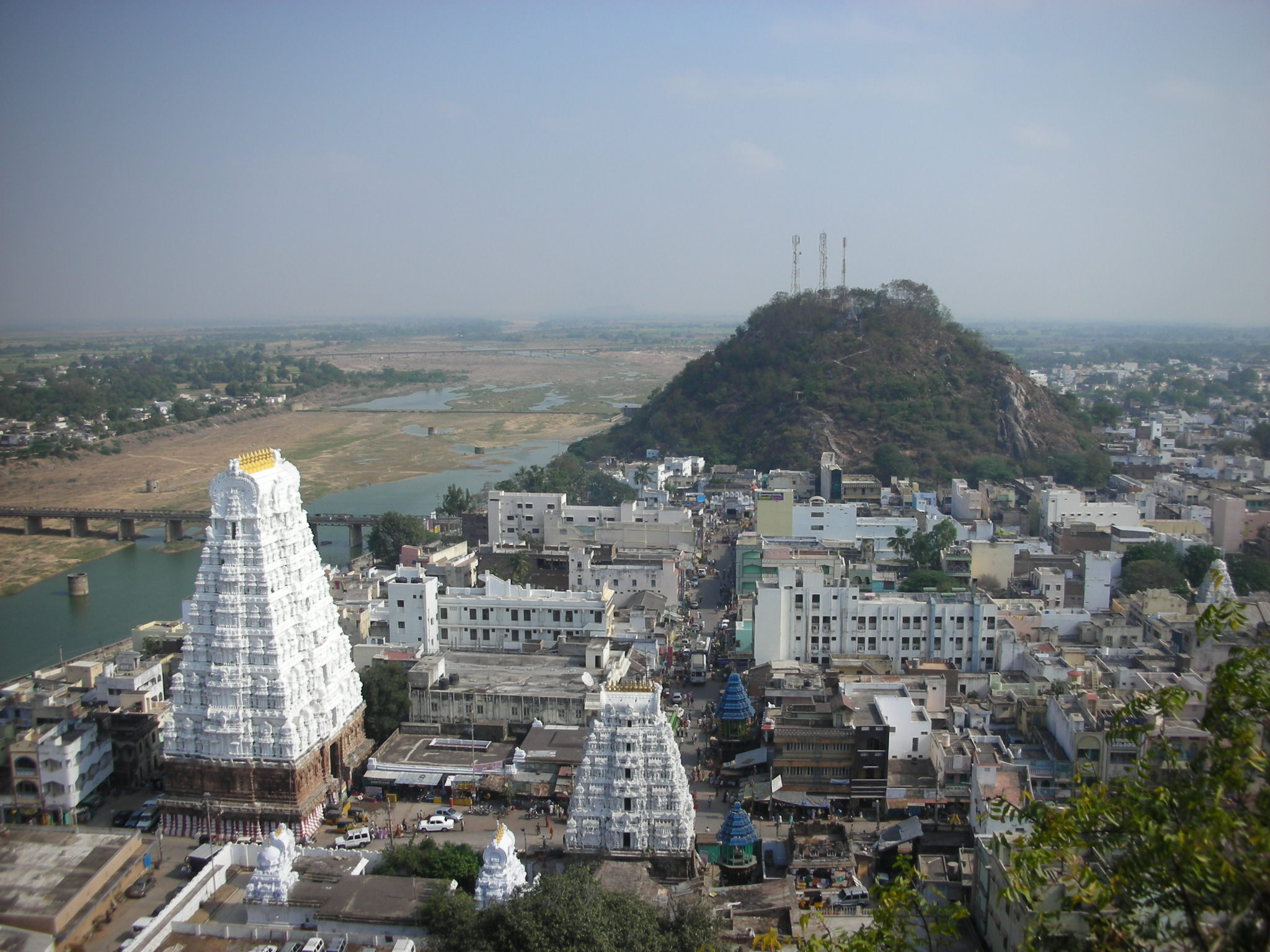
- An aerial view of the town and the temple

- Location in Andhra Pradesh

Religion
- Affiliation: Hinduism
- District: Tirupati
- Deity: Srikalahasteeswara (Shiva), Gnana Prasunambika Devi (Parvati)
- Festival: Maha Sivaratri

Location
- Location: Srikalahasti
- State: Andhra Pradesh
- Country: India
- Coordinates: 13°44′58″N 79°41′54″E

Architecture
- Type: Dravidian architecture
- Creator: Rajendra Chola I
- Established: 5th century CE

Website
- Srikalahasti

The Srikalahasti Temple is in the town of Srikalahasti in Tirupati district in the state of Andhra Pradesh, India. Shiva in his aspect as Vayu is worshipped as Kalahasteeswara. The temple is also regarded as Rahu-Ketu kshetra and Dakshina Kailasam. According to regional tradition, it is said to be the site where Kannappa was ready to offer both his eyes to cover blood flowing from the Shivalinga before Shiva stopped him and granted him moksha.

Srikalahasti temple, situated 36 km away from Tirupati, is known for its Vayu Lingam (Wind Lingam), one of the Pancha Bhuta Sthalams, representing the wind. The temple is about 3Km from Sri Kalahasti(KHT) railway station.

== Legend ==
In primordial times, the wind-god Vayu performed penance for thousands of years to the Karpoora Lingam, the lingam of Shiva made of camphor. Pleased with Vayu's penance, Shiva manifested before him and bestowed him three boons. Vayu was blessed to present everywhere in the world in form of air and want to be an integral part of every being in form of vayus. Further, The linga that Vayu worshipped was named as the Vayu Lingam after him and was declared to be worshipped by various beings.

== History ==
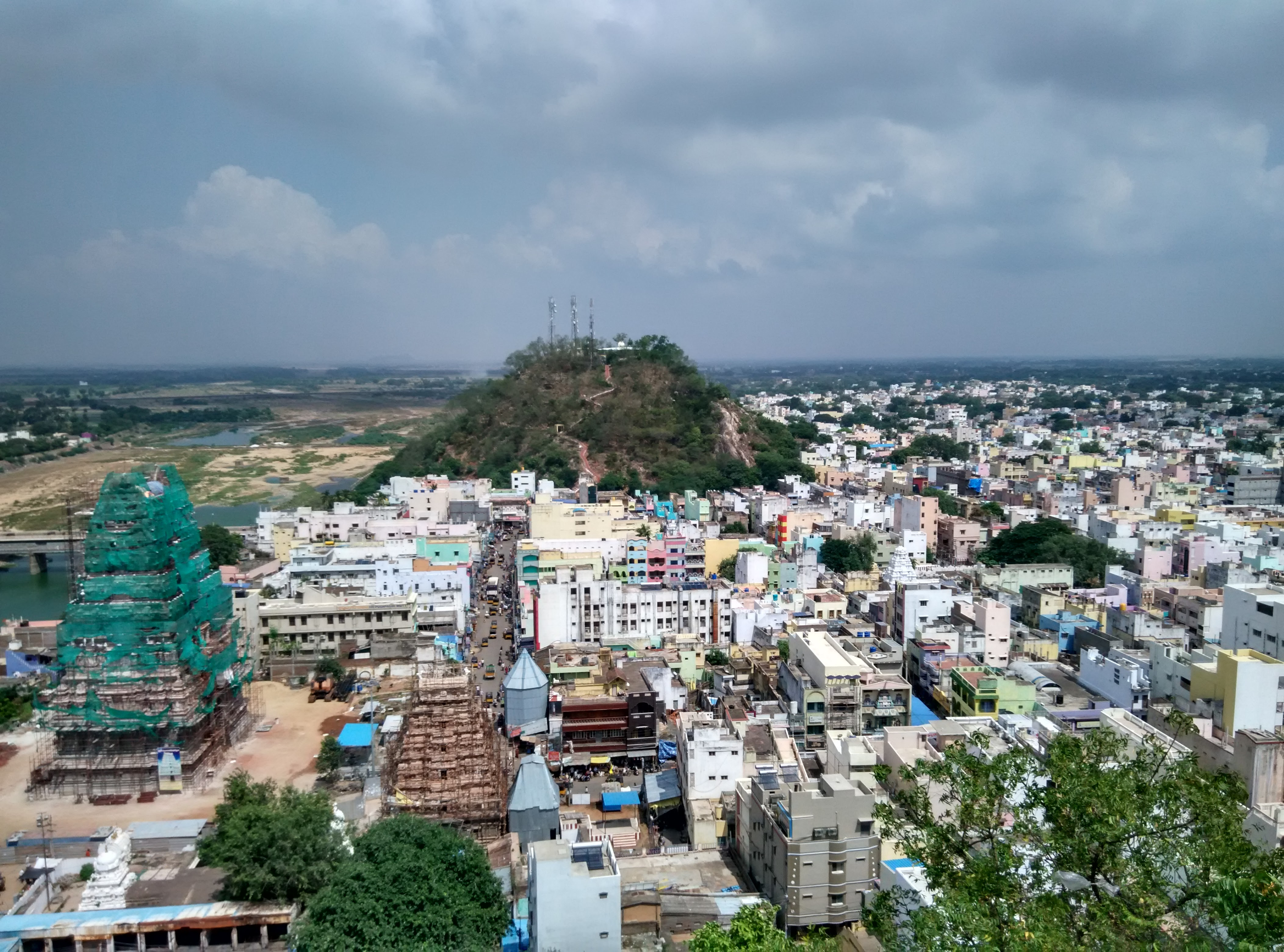
The temple in reconstruction, view from Kannappa Hill near the river (2016)

Around the 11th century CE, the Chola emperor Rajendra Chola I king renovated the temple and constructed the main structure. Kulottunga Chola I, contrived and built the beautiful gopurams, located at the entrance facing south, during the 11th century CE. Inscriptions of Rajaditya Chola, Rajaraja Chola I, Rajadhiraja Chola I, Kulottunga Chola I, Kulottunga Chola III are found across the temple. The temple received contributions from various ruling dynasties like Chola Dynasty, Reddi kingdom and Vijayanagar Empire. The 120 feet (37 m) high main gopuram and the hundred pillared hall with intricate carvings was commissioned during the regime of the Vijayanagara Krishnadevaraya during 1516 CE.

The main gopuram, built by king Krishnadevaraya, collapsed on 26 May 2010. As per the Archaeology Department, the temple tower stood on a foundation that had a depth of only one-and-a-half feet and had a thin crack 25 years before it collapsed which expanded as years passed by. The Rajagopuram was reconstructed in its original form at the same location with a budget of 45 crores and was consecrated on 18 January 2017.

== Connection to Sri Kalahasti and Dakshinamurti ==
Enlightenment of Vasishtha Maharshi: According to local lore and temple history, a troubled and childless Vasishta Maharshi performed intense penance and prayer at Sri Kalahasti

The Role of Dakshinamurthy: Lord Shiva appeared to Vasishta Maharshi in the form of Dakshinamurthy—facing toward the south—to impart supreme knowledge (jnana) and quiet inner awakening

Shrine Layout: The temple features specific directional alignments where the Dakshinamurthy shrine faces toward the south, serving as a pillar of silent wisdom in what is revered as a Shiva Jnana Kshetra (a sacred place of supreme wisdom)

== Architecture ==
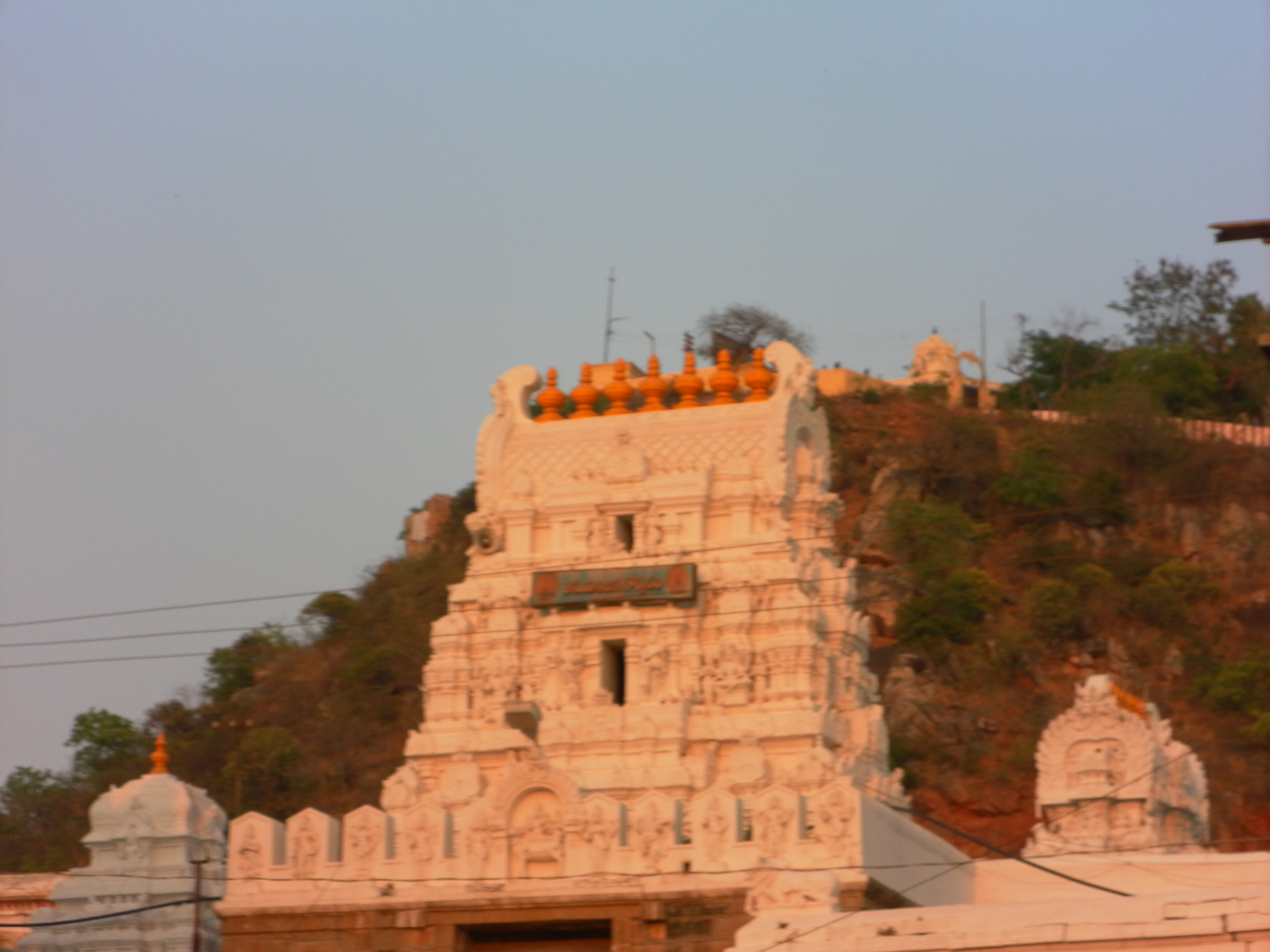
The shrine of Jnanaprasunambika located parallel to the Shiva shrine

The presiding image of Shiva in the form of Linga is made of white stone (believed to be the solidification of camphor) in a tall cylindrical shape resembling an elephant trunk. The stone is divided into 5 segments representing the 5 hoods of a snake. Horizontally, the lingam is divided into three parts, the top representing the snake, the middle representing the tusks of the elephant and the bottom having the carving of the spider. The lingam is lit by many lamps in the sanctum. Miraculously, the lingam never caught fire even though camphor is a flammable substance. The temple faces south, while the sanctum faces west. The temple is located on the foothills of a hill, while there is also a belief that the temple was carved out of the monolithic hill. There is a rock-cut shrine of Shiva's son Ganesha, 9 ft (2.7 m) below the ground level. Vallabha Ganapathi, Mahalakshmi-Ganpathi and Sahasra Lingeswara are some of the rare images found in the temple. There is a large shrine of Jnanaprasunambika, the consort of Kalahatisvara. There are smaller shrines in the temple for Kasi Viswanatha, Annapurna, Surya, Sadyoganapathi and Shiva's second son Murugan. There are two large halls namely Sadyogi Mandapa and Jalkoti Mandapa. There are two water tanks associated with the temple namely, Surya Pushkarani and Chandra Pushkarani.

== Religious importance ==
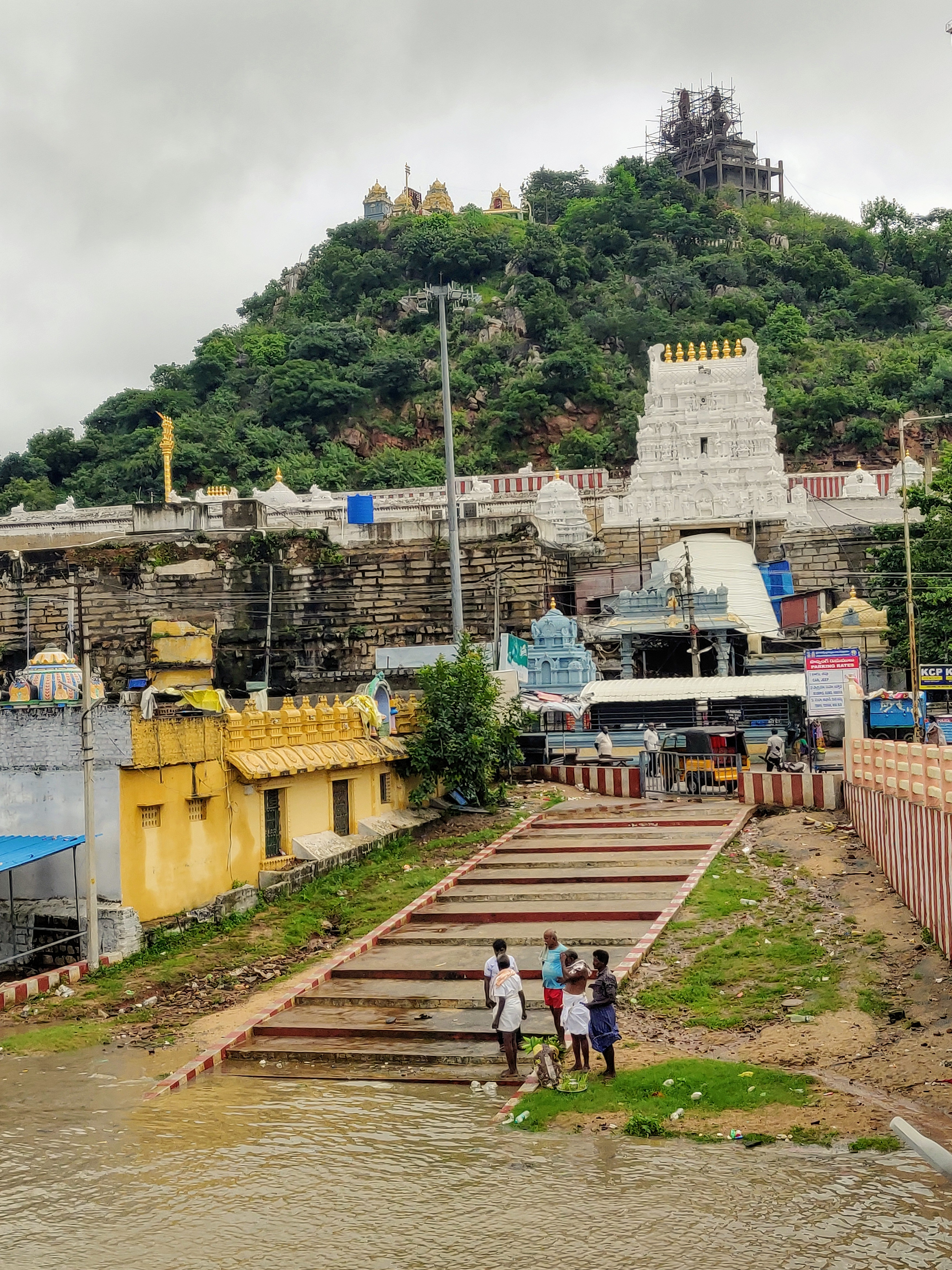
Ghat leading to Swarnamukhi River

The temple is revered as one of the Pancha Bhoota Stalam where the presiding deity is worshipped as Vayu linga (the embodiment of air). This temple is considered the "Kailash of the South". Saivaite saints of the first century sang about this temple. This is the only temple in India which remains open during Solar and lunar eclipses, while, all other temples are closed. This temple is famous for the Rahu-Kethu pooja. It is believed that performing this pooja will ward the people from astrological effects of Rahu and Kethu, the demigods which cause eclipses.

As per Hindu legend, Kalahasteeshwara was worshipped at this place by Brahma during all four Yugas. Arjuna, the Pandava prince during Mahabharata is believed to have worshipped the presiding deity. The legend of Kannappa, who was a hunter and turned into an ardent devotee of Shiva accidentally, is associated with the temple.

The temple also finds mention in the works of Nakeerar and the Nalvars, namely, Appar, Sundarar, Sambandar and Manickavasagar in the canonical works of Tirumura. As the temple is revered in Tevaram, it is classified as Paadal Petra Sthalam, one of the 275 temples that find mention in the Saiva canon.

== Culture ==
The temple follows the Shaivite tradition. Maha Shivaratri is the most important festival when lakhs of devotees offer prayers to seek blessings. Mahashivaratri Brahmotsavams are celebrated in par with Maha Shivaratri for 13 days during which the processional idols of Shiva and Parvati will be taken on Vahanams in a procession around the temple streets.
