= Srinivasa Nagar, Tiruchirappalli =

Srinivasa Nagar ஸ்ரீனிவாச நகர்
- Neighbourhood
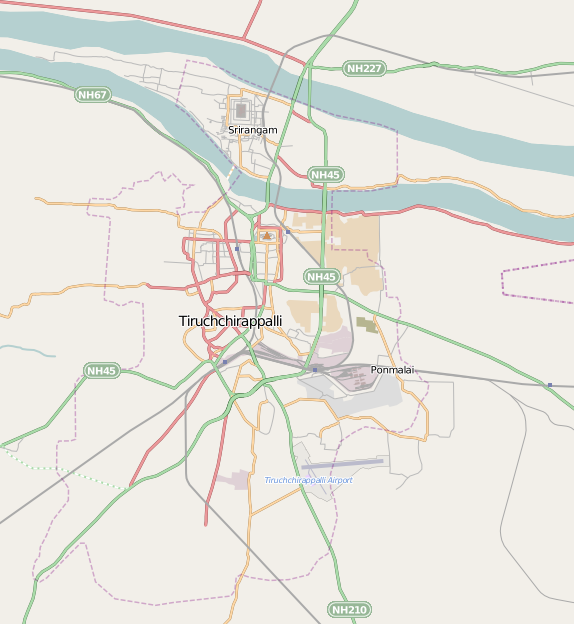
- Location within Tiruchirapalli
- Coordinates: 10°51′12″N 78°41′52″E
- Country: India
- State: Tamil Nadu
- Time zone: UTC+5.30 (IST)

Srinivasa Nagar is a suburb of the city of Tiruchirappalli in Tamil Nadu, India. It is situated on Srirangam Island and forms a part of the Srirangam zone of the Tiruchirappalli Municipal Corporation.
