= Yamunakalyani =

Janya raga of Carnatic music

- Arohanam: S R₂ G₃ P M₂ G₃ P D₂ N₃ D₂ Ṡ
- Avarohanam: Ṡ N₃ D₂ P M₂ G₃ M₁ R₂ S

Yamunakalyani is the janya raga of Mechakalyani, the 65th Melakarta ragam. It brings out Bhakthi, Sringara, Gambheera and Shantha rasas.

== Raga Lakshana ==
Yamunakalyani / Yaman kalyan / Yaman Kalyani is a Sampoorna Bhashanga Raga.It is said to be borrowed from Hindustani music and is the Carnatic adaptation of the Hindustani raga: Yaman Kalyan. Its arohana-avarohana is as follows:

- Arohana: S R₂ G₃ P M₂ G₃ P D₂ N₃ D₂ Ṡ (Note: Alternate notations: Hindustani: S R G P M̄ G P D N D Ṡ; Western: C D E G F♯ E G A B A C)
- Avarohana: Ṡ N₃ D₂ P M₂ G₃ M₁ R₂ S (Note: Alternate notations: Hindustani: Ṡ N D P M̄ G M R S; Western: C B A G F♯ E F D C)

The swaras are Shadjam, Chathusruthi Rishabham, Antara Gandharam, Panchamam, Prathi Madhyamam, Chathusruthi Dhaivatham, Kakali Nishadam. Shudha Madhyama is seen in avarohana, but it must be used sparingly. Usually the avarohana is sung with a brief instance of M1 between G3 and R2.

The jeeva swaras are– R, G, M, D and N.

S, G, P and N forms the Graha swaras. M1 is the anya swara. The characteristic phrases of this raga are NDNR -NRNG – DNRG. PMRGR – GMR SNRS(Ranjaka prayogas).

Another type of this raga, with shadava-shadava scale, according to some sources is as follows:

- Arohana: S R₂ G₃ P M₂ P D₂ Ṡ (Note: Alternate notations: Hindustani: S R G P M̄ P D Ṡ; Western: C D E G F♯ G A C)
- Avarohana: Ṡ D₂ P M₂ P G₃ R₂ S (Note: Alternate notations: Hindustani: Ṡ D P M̄ P G R S; Western: C A G F♯ G E D C)
