= Indiramma Iyengar =

Indian philanthropist and community organizer (1914–2010)

Indiramma Janardhana Iyengar
- Born: 9 September 1914; Kollegal, Karnataka, British Raj
- Died: 3 November 2010 (aged 96); Mysore, Karnataka, India
- Resting place: Chirashantidharma, Gokulam, Mysore, India
- Education: Lower Secondary School, Kollegal, India

Indiramma Janardhana Iyengar (9 September 1914 – 3 November 2010), also known as Manni, was philanthropist and community organizer in Mysore, India.

== Biography ==
Indiramma Janardhana Iyengar, or H. R. Indiramma, né Indiramma Srinivasa Iyengar, was the eldest of the three children of Srinivasa Iyengar and Sowmyanaki; her siblings were a younger brother, Sampath, and a younger sister, Padma. She graduated from the Lower Secondary school in Kollegal in 1926.

On February 26, 1926, she married 18-year-old H. R. Janardhana Iyengar, son of Haradanahalli Ramaswamy Iyengar and Janakamma. Her husband would become a successful engineer, contractor, architect, designer, and also an established philanthropist in Mysore. After marriage, she lived in Bangalore until 1940, in a joint family, and then moved with the family to Mysore, where she remained permanently. She had five sons—Ramaswamy (born 1934), Srinivas (1938), Rangaraj (1940), Krishnamurthy (1942) and Prakash (1944)--and two daughters: Rathna (wife of K. K. Srinivasan; 1936) and Lavanya born in 1950. She had fifteen grandchildren, who now reside in the United States, the United Kingdom, Australia, and India.

Throughout her life, she ardently followed the Srivaishnava philosophy and Hebbar Iyengar customs and traditions. Although not a professional Carnatic musician, she was a respected singer, notably of Devarnamas. Indiramma was also a follower the teachings of Ramanujacharya, with expertise in the Gadhya Thrayams, Vaikunta Gadyam, Saranagati Gadyam and the Sriranga Gadyam. Under the tutelage of her mother-in-law and mother, Indiramma became well-versed in the Bhagavad Gita and the Bhagavatha Purana. Manni was conscientiously active in festivals and traditions, such as reading the Ramayana and performing the Rama Pattabhishekam on Vijayadashami during Mysore Dasara, which she performed infallibly for decades. While raising seven successful children with her husband, she devoted herself to hospitality, generosity, and kindness, opening her home for to a multitude of people as they worked and studied in Mysore, and providing financial and material support to the Mysore community; throughout her life, she was a respected member and a point of light in the community.

H. R. Janardhana Iyengar died on 6 February 1991. She lost her son, Rangaraj, at age 59 to leukemia on December 15, 1999. She was stoic in her grief and accepted all life events that came to pass with prasada budhi. Throughout the last 15 years of her life, she underwent significant physical hardship, having lost her mobility to multiple hip fractures and also her eyesight. Bearing these burdens, she maintained her activities and philanthropy to the best of her ability with a strong mentation and genial outlook. Indiramma was a beautiful and gentle being, devoted to God, her family and her community. She died on 3 November 2010.

She was a trustee of the Sri Lakshmi Venkataramanaswamy temple in V. V. Mohalla, Mysore.
