= Mahajana Law College =

Law college in Mysuru, Karnataka, India

SBRR Mahajana Law College
- Motto: Dharmo Rakshati Rakshitaha
- Established: 1992
- School type: Private
- Location: Mysuru, Karnataka, India; 12°19′17.5″N 76°37′27.9″E
- Website: law.mahajana.edu.in

SBRR Mahajana Law College is a private law college in Jayalakshmipuram, Mysuru, Karnataka, India. It was established in 1992 and is run by the Mahajana Education Society.

== History ==
The college was founded in 1992 under the guidance of Prof. C. K. N. Raja.

== Academics ==
The college is recognised by the Bar Council of India and affiliated to Karnataka State Law University, Hubballi. It offers a three-year LL.B. degree.

The principal is Sowmya K.

== Related institutions ==
SBRR Mahajana First Grade College, also run by the Mahajana Education Society, is a sister institution in Jayalakshmipuram.

== See also ==
- SBRR Mahajana First Grade College
- Karnataka State Law University
