= Thiruneermalai (temple complex) =

Hindu temple in Chennai

- Neervana Perumal Temple
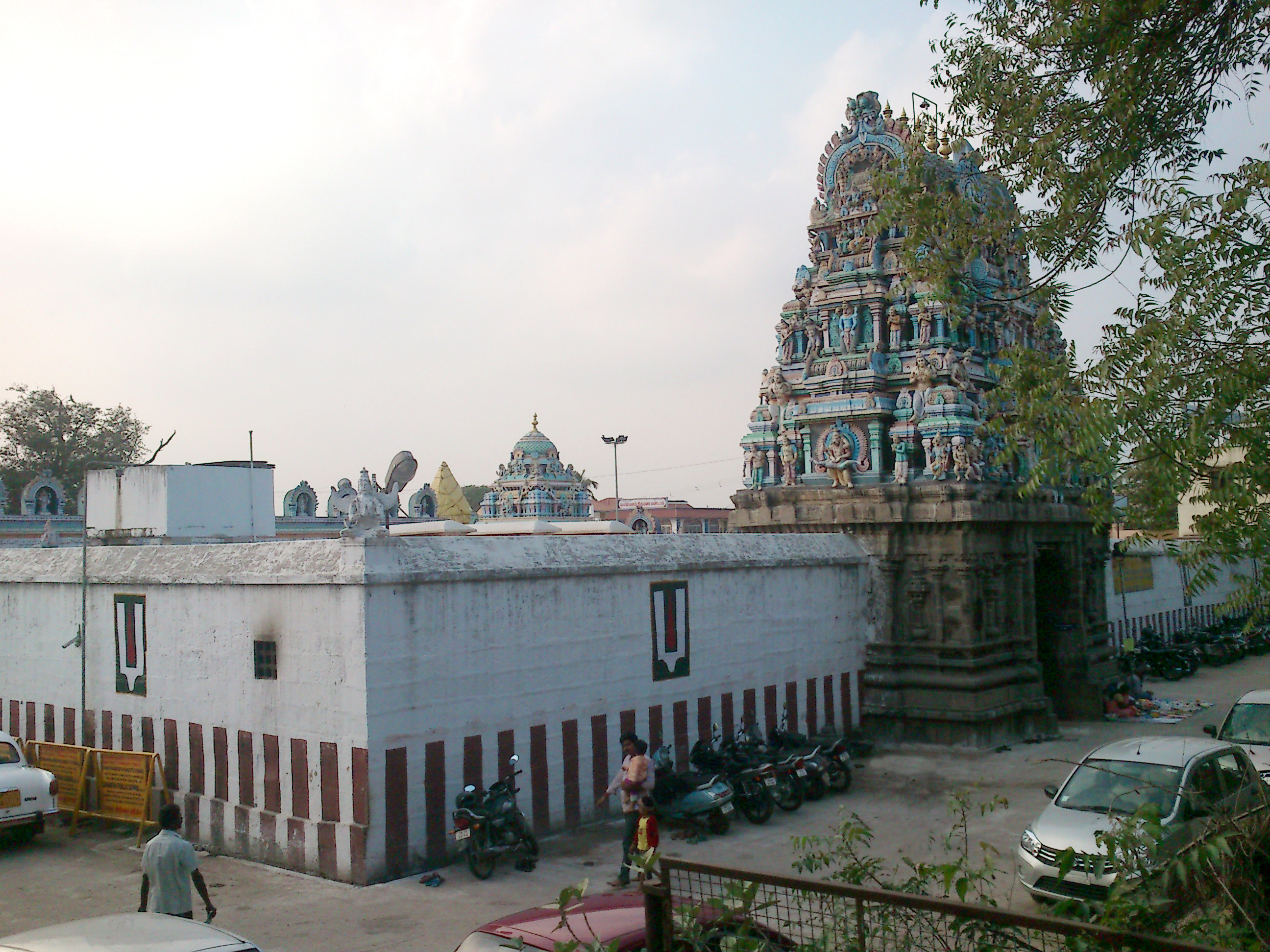
- Image of the temple

- Location in Tamil Nadu

Religion
- Affiliation: Hinduism
- District: Chengalpattu district
- Deity: Ranganatha/Neervanna Perumal (Vishnu); Ranganayaki/Animamalarmangai Tayar (Lakshmi)

Location
- Location: Thiruneermalai
- State: Tamil Nadu
- Country: India
- Interactive map of Thiruneermalai (temple complex)
- Coordinates: 12.963681°N 80.114686°E

Architecture
- Type: Dravidian architecture

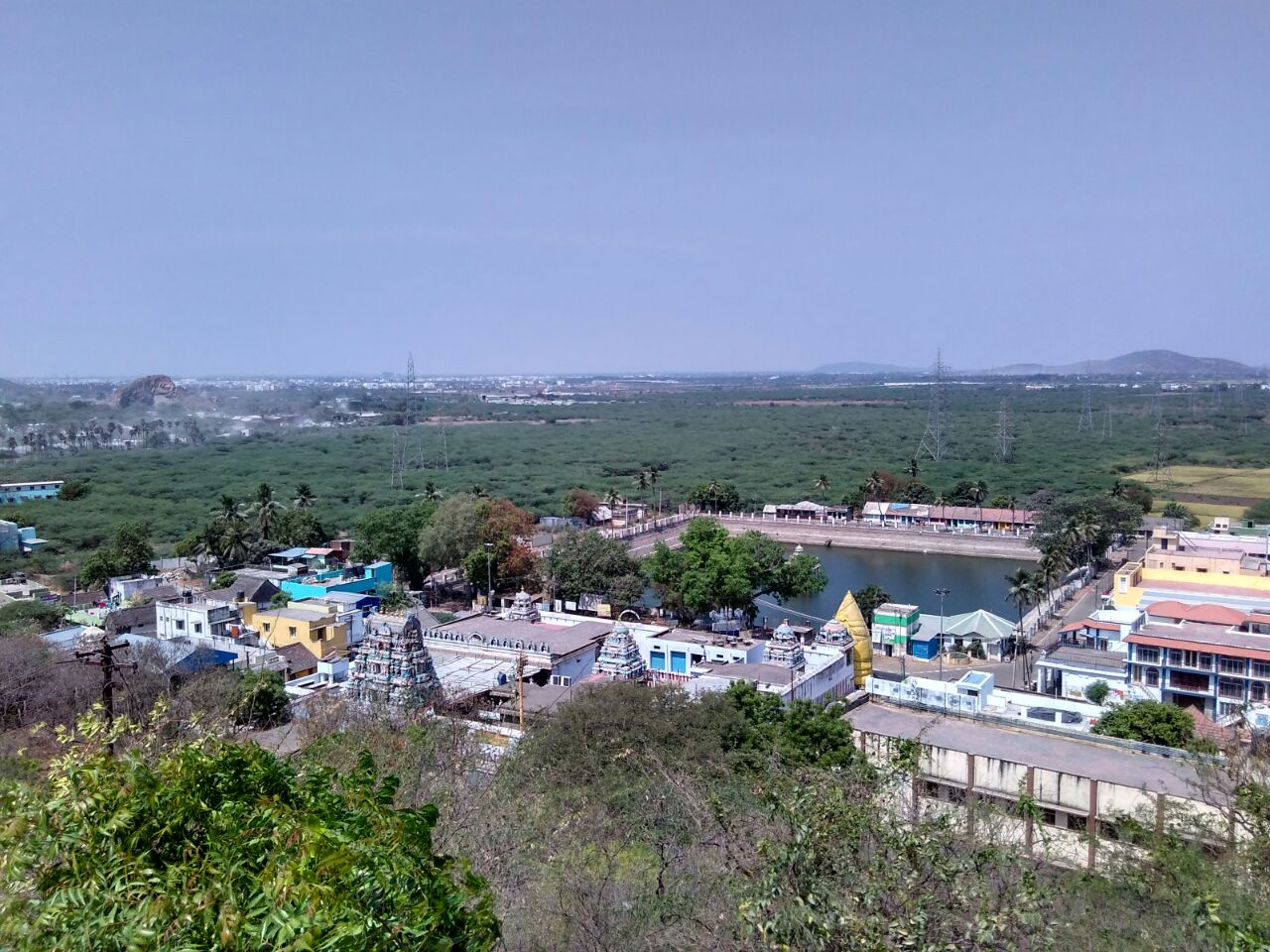
Aerial view of the Ranganatha swamy temple, taken from top of the hill

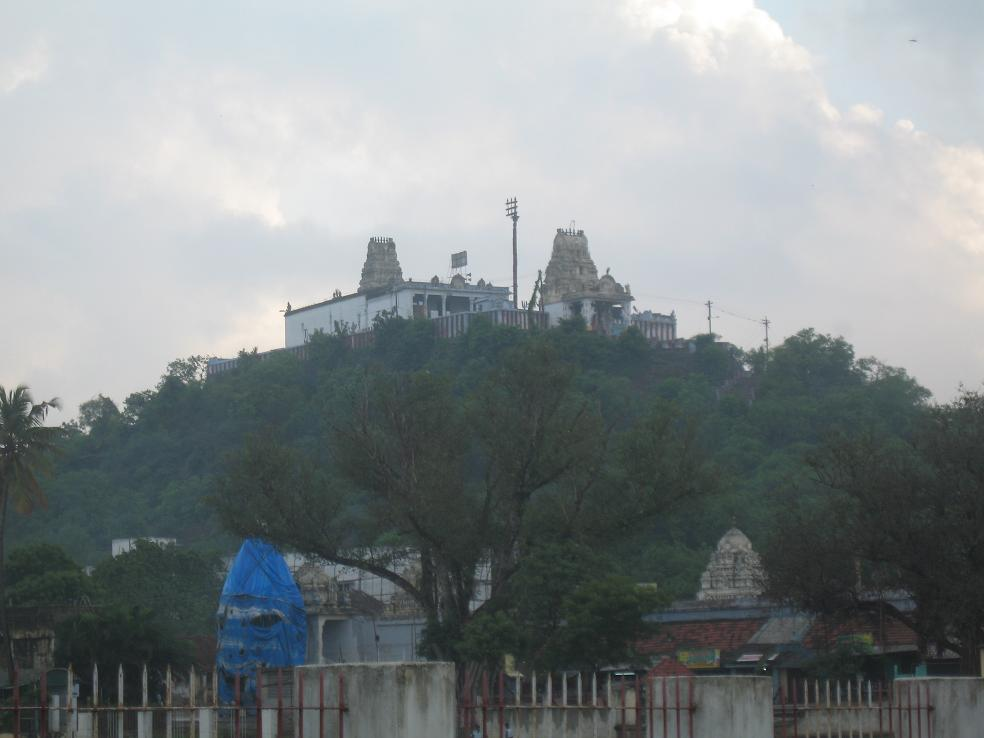
Sri Ranganathaswami Temple atop the Holy Hill

The Thiruneermalai temple complex consists of two temples, the Ranganatha Temple and the Thiruneermalai Neervanna Perumal Temple. Both are Hindu temples in Thiruneermalai, a suburb of Chennai, Tamil Nadu, India.

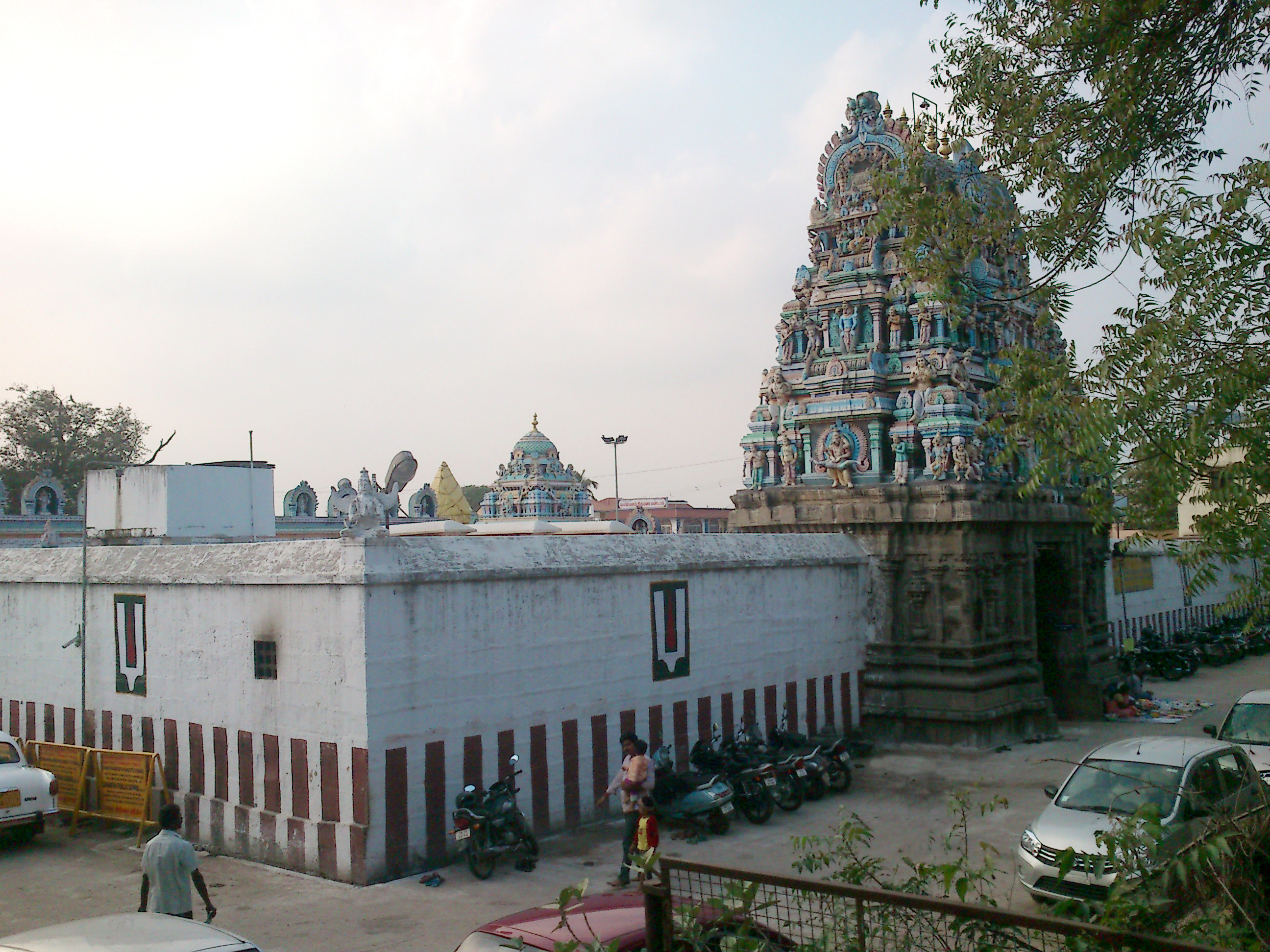
Sri Neervannaperumal Temple at the foot of the hill

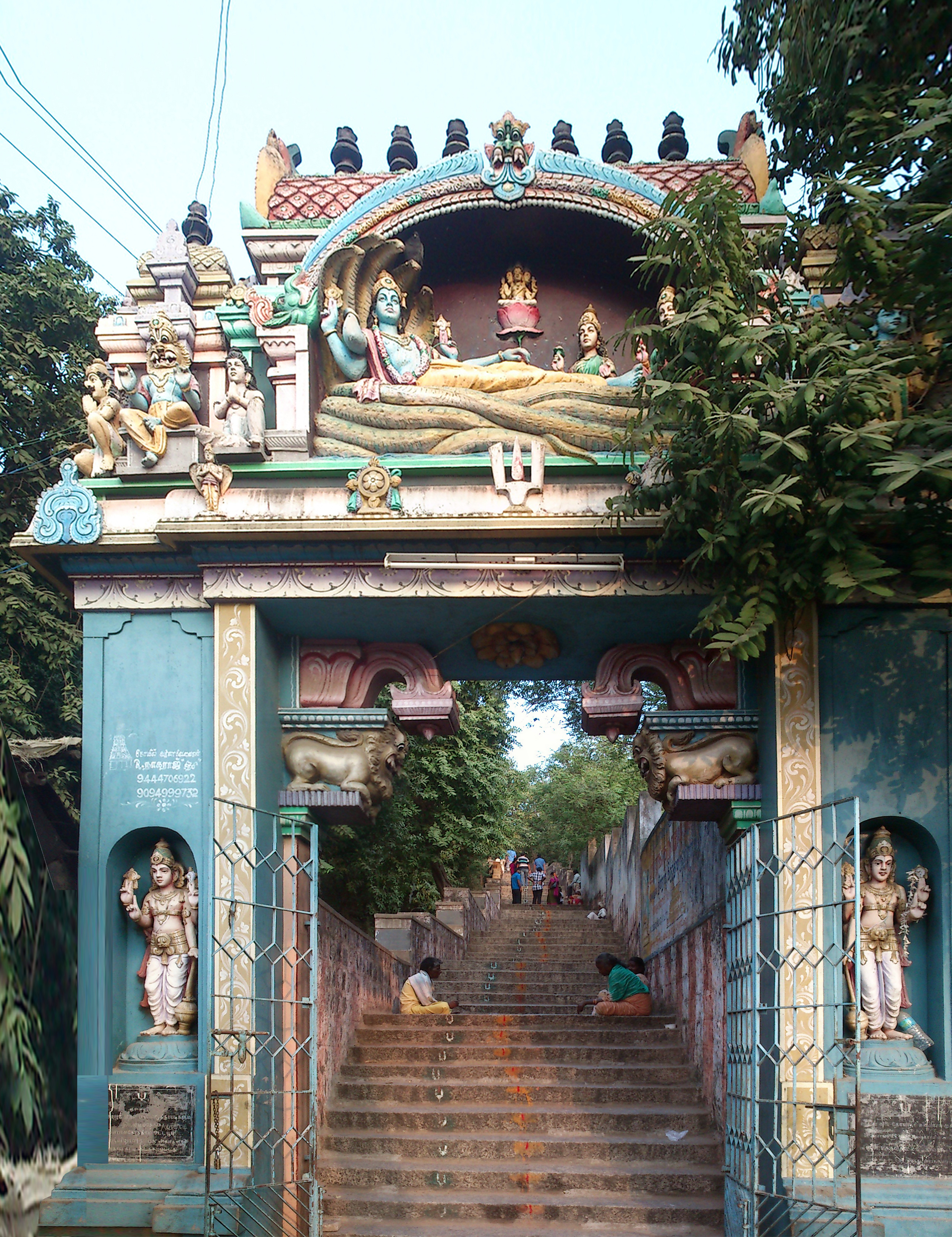
Steps to Holy Hill

There are two temples, one at the top of the hill and other in the foothills. In all, the temple occupies an area of 15 acres (6.1 ha), with the lower shrine covering 3 acres (1.2 ha). The presiding deity of the temple in the foothills is Neervana Perumal in standing posture. Ranganatha is the presiding deity uphill and the shrine, vimana above the sanctum is called Ranga Vimana. There are images of Trivikrama and Narasimha around the first precinct. The temple tank is called the Kshira Pushkarini and it is believed to feed the waters of Vaikuntha, and the Ocean of Milk. The Karunya Pushkarini is the second tank, which is believed to have formed from the weeping of Narasimha, who was moved by the divine prayers of Prahlada. There are two other tanks called Svarna Pushkarini and Siddha Pushkarini.

It is dedicated to the Hindu deity Vishnu, regionally referred to as Neervana Perumal and Ranganatha. The complex is of two parts: one at the base of the hill for the primary deity Neervanan, featured in a standing posture, and also housing shrines of his consort Animamalarmangai Tayar, Kalyana Ramar, and Andal. The shrine for Anjaneya (Hanuman) is to the right, upon the hill shrine. The temple complex up the hill has three shrines for Ranganatha, found in reclining posture, Trivikrama, featured in a walking posture), Narasimha, featured in a sitting posture. There also exists a shrine for Ranganayaki Tayar, facing the east. It is a double prakaram (outer courtyard) temple. The Garuda shrine faces the deity.

The temple has lot of inscriptions from the Chola and later Pandyas, indicating generous contributions to the temple.

== Legend ==
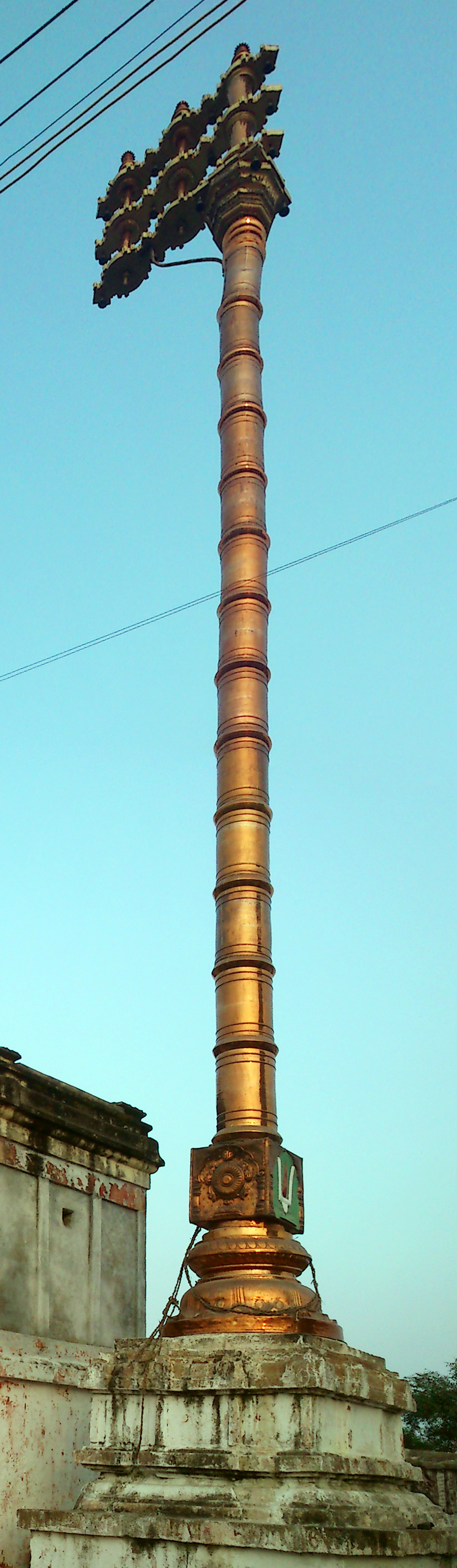
Flag staff at Sri Ranganathaswamy temple on hill top

According to this temple's regional legend, this site is referred to as Toyatri, meaning a mountain surrounded by water. Thiruneermalai, the modern Tamil name also means a sacred mountain surrounded by water. Among the eight sacred Vishnu temples where he manifested himself called the Ashta Svayam Vyaktha Kshetram. According to regional legend, Sage Valmiki, after composing the epic Ramayana, worshipped Ranganatha at the top of the hill. When he came downhills, he wanted to receive a theophany of Rama, who appeared for the devotee. Lakshmi appeared as Sita, Adi Shesha appeared as Lakshmana, Vishnu's conch, the Panchajanya as Bharatha, his discus, the Sudarshana Chakra as Shatrughna, and Garuda in the form of Hanuman.

As per a legend, the poet-saint Thirumangai Alvar was held up in the top of the mountain for six months as the place was surrounded by water. Thirumangai Alvar has glorified the temple highlighting the unique aspect of the temple where Vishnu is seen in four different poses of Standing (Neervana Perumal), Lying (Sriranganathar), Sitting (Narasimha) and walking (Trivikrama). Bhoothath Alvar also composed hymns praising the temple.

== Religious practices ==
Two Bramhotsavams and the Uttiram (Birth star of mother goddess) are celebrated. The Bramhotsavam of Neervanan is held in the Tamil month of Panguni (mid March – mid April) and for Rangantha Perumal in the month of Chittirai (mid April – mid May). While Panguni Uttiram is celebrated for Ranganayaki Tayar, Masi Uttiram is celebrated of Animamalarmangai Tayar, the consort of Neervana Perumal.

The temple rituals are conducted as per the Vaikhanasa tradition.

== See also ==
- Religion in Chennai
- Heritage structures in Chennai
