= Pratham (disambiguation) =

Pratham (Sanskrit, 'first') is a non-governmental organisation in India.

Pratham may also refer to:

- Pratham (satellite), an Indian ionospheric research satellite
- Pratham (Kannada actor) (fl. from 2014)
- Pratham Singh (born 1992), Indian cricketer
- Pratham, a former community in Sardinia, New York, United States

== See also ==
- Pratama (disambiguation)
- Pratham Mysore, a non-profit organization
