= Sriranga Gadyam =

Hindu hymn

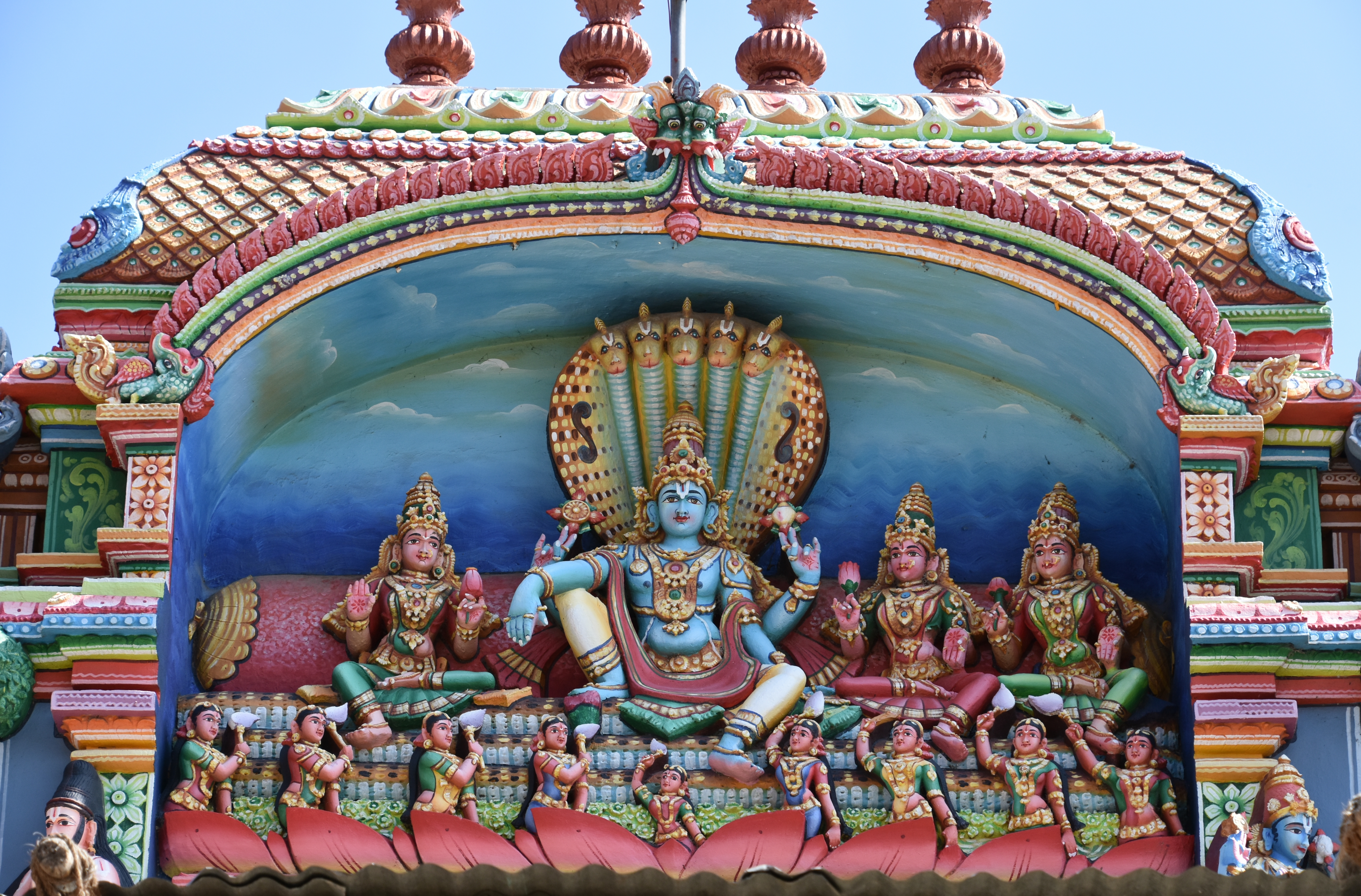
Statues of Ranganatha and his consorts, extolled in this text, Srirangam

The Sriranga Gadyam (Sanskrit: श्रीरंगगद्यम्, romanized: Śrīraṅgagadyam) is a Sanskrit prayer written by the Hindu philosopher Ramanuja towards the end of the 11th century. It is one of the first bhakti prayers in the Sri Vaishnava school of thought and is the basis for many prayers, like the Raghuvira Gadyam, also of this style. It is recited in the 108 Divya Desam temples, including Srirangam.

== Composition ==
According to the Sri Vaishnava narrative, Ramanuja and his disciples visited the Ranganathaswamy Temple in Srirangam on Panguni Uttiram (Uttara Phalguni), a day in the Tamil calendar month of Panguni on the day of the ascension of the star called Uttiram. In Tamil mythology, Uttiram was in ascent when the chief goddess of the temple, Ranganayaki, a form of Lakshmi, was born. Ramanuja was inspired by the festivities of the day and composed the Sriranga Gadyam, the Saranagati Gadyam, and the Vaikuntha Gadyam.

== Content ==
The Sriranga Gadyam, unlike the commentaries of Ramanuja on Vedanta, does not have detailed philosophical debates. Instead, it is a pure expression of bhakti and gives a detailed description of the deity Ranganatha as the repository of infinite guna, which he calls kalyana guna (virtuous quality).

First he describes Ranganatha as jnana (true and perfect knowledge), bala (strength), aishvarya (sovereignty), virya (virility), shakti (power), agni (radiance), saushilya (good-naturedness), vatsalya (pure love), mardava (affection), arjava (honesty), sauharda (benevolence), samya (equanimous), karunya (mercy), madhurya (sweetness), gambhirya (majesty), audharya (liberal), chaturya (intelligence), sthairya (tenacious), dhairya (courage), shaurya (valour), parakrama (vitality), satyakama (the lover of truth), satya sankalpa (true resolve), krititvam (achiever of goals), kritanganatha (lord of actions) and the repository and ocean of all such innumerable virtues. He is extolled as Parabrahman and Purushotthama (the ultimate being).

Next, he explains how he is trapped in the cycle of samsara and bound by his karma into doing actions that result in sins. Neither jnana yoga, the yoga of knowledge, nor karma yoga, the part of virtuous deeds as described in Bhagavad Gita help him achieve moksha.

Finally, he asks that unworthy as he is in so many ways, he be granted the grace of Ranganatha.

== Style ==
The prose of this hymn comprises alternate long and short sentences with many adjectival phrases.

== See also ==
- Sharanagati Gadyam
- Vaikuntha Gadyam
- Raghuvira Gadyam
