= Vaikuntha Gadyam =

Hindu hymn

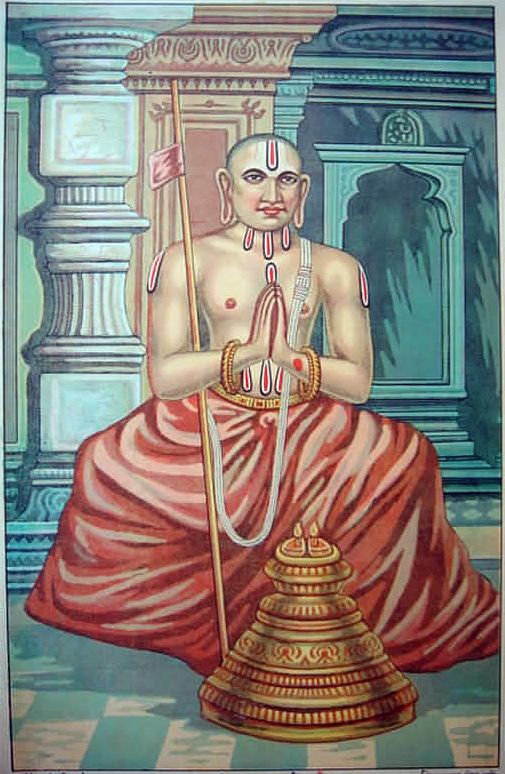
Painting of Ramanuja, the author of this work

The Vaikuntha Gadyam (Sanskrit: वैकुंठगद्यम्, romanized: Vaikuṇṭhagadyam) is a Sanskrit prayer written by the Hindu philosopher Ramanuja towards the end of the 11th century. It is one of the first bhakti prayers in the Sri Vaishnava school of thought and is the basis for many prayers of this style. It is recited in the 108 Divya Desam temples, including Srirangam.

== Legend ==
According to Sri Vaishnava tradition, Ramanuja and his disciples visited the Ranganatha temple in Srirangam on Panguni Uttiram, a day in spring of the Tamil calendar month of Panguni (phalguna) on the day of the ascension of the star called Uttiram. According to tradition, Uttiram was in ascent when the goddess of the temple, Ranganayaki, a form of Lakshmi, was born. Ramanuja was inspired by the festivities of the day and composed the Sriranga Gadyam and the Sharanagati Gadyam. According to tradition, the deity Ranganatha is regarded to have been moved by these compositions, and gave Ramanuja a vision of his abode, Vaikuntha. This inspired Ramanuja to compose the Vaikuntha Gadyam.

== Content ==
The Vaikuntha Gadyam, unlike the commentaries of Ramanuja on Vedanta, does not have detailed philosophical debates. Instead, it is a pure expression of bhakti and gives a detailed description of Vaikuntha seen through the eyes of a liberated one (jivanmukti). Ramanuja stresses the important message that surrender to Narayana's lotus feet (Narayana Sayujyam) results in salokyam (attaining the abode of Narayana), sarupyam (purity of soul) and samipyam (remaining close to God). He glorifies the eternal kaimkaryam (devoted work) performed by devotees like Shesha, Garuda, Vishvaksena, a devotee considered first among equals, and the dvarapalakas (door keepers) to Vaikuntha, Jaya-Vijaya. He then gives a brief glimpse of the "bountiful treasure" awaiting a devotee who does similar devotional work.

== Style ==
The work comprises alternate long and short sentences with many adjectival phrases.

== See also ==
- Sharanagati Gadyam
- Sriranga Gadyam
- Raghuvira Gadyam
