= H. R. Janardhana Iyengar =

Engineer from India

Haradanahalli Ramaswamy Janardhana Iyengar
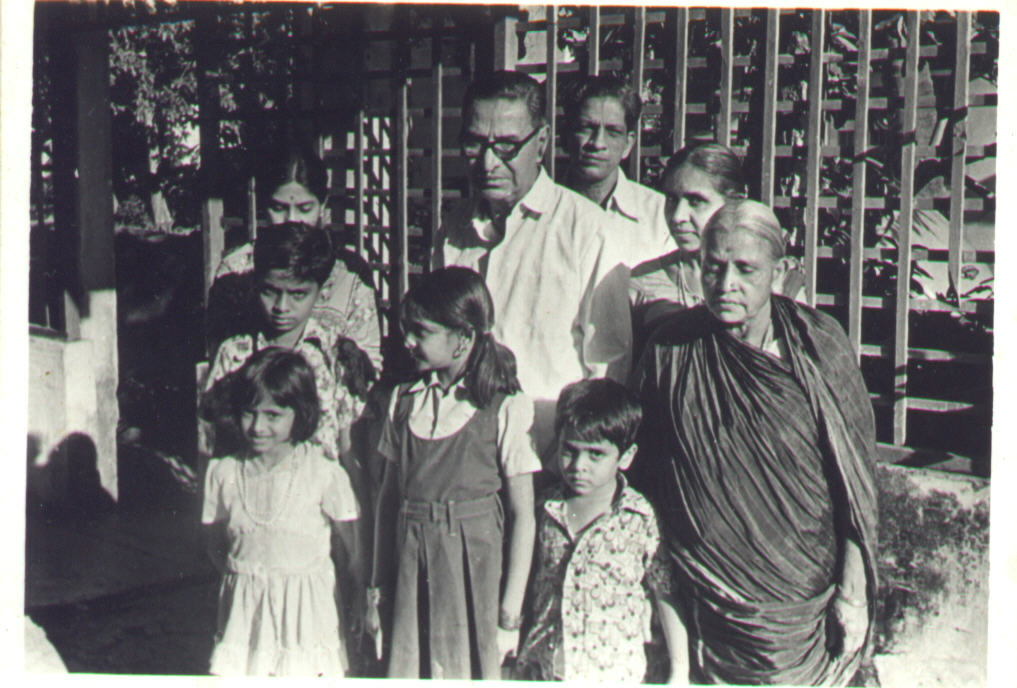
- H. R. Janardhana Iyengar with his wife, daughter and grandchildren in the late 1970s
- Born: 8 September 1908; Mysore, Karnataka, India
- Died: 6 February 1991 (aged 82); Mysore, India
- Resting place: Mysore, India
- Citizenship: India
- Education: University of Mysore
- Occupation: Engineer
- Years active: 1930-c. 1978
- Employer(s): Bangalore Public Water Works Department, Mysore Engineering Corporation, Associated Mysore Engineering Company, Mysore Concrete Construction, United Engineering Corporation, Mysore Chip Boards, Bharat Engineering Corporation
- Known for: numerous engineering projects in Karnataka in the mid-20th century
- Successor: B.J. Srinivas, B. Rangaraj, M.J. Krishnamurthy
- Board member of: Mysore Engineering Corporation; Associated Mysore Engineering Company; Mysore Concrete Construction; United Engineering Corporation; Mysore Chip Boards; Bharat Engineering Corporation; Governing Council, National Institute of Engineering; Institution of Engineers (India), Mysore Local Centre
- Spouse: Indiramma Iyengar
- Partner(s): K. S. Ramaswamy, Thirumalachar
- Children: B.K. Ramaswamy, J. Ratna, B. J. Srinivas, B. Rangaraj, M. J. Krishnamurthy, M. J. Prakash, J. Lavanya
- Parent(s): Haradanahalli Ramaswamy Iyengar and Janakamma

Haradanahalli Ramaswamy Janardhana Iyengar (8 September 1908 – 6 February 1991) was a civil engineer in Mysore, India. He contributed to the engineering profession during the 1940s and 1950s through his innovative methods and original designs.

== Childhood and education ==
Janardhana Iyengar was the eldest child of Haradanahalli Ramaswamy Iyengar and Janakamma. He had three younger sisters and two younger brothers. At age 18, he married 12-year-old Indiramma Srinivasa Iyengar of Kollegal. In 1927, when Iyengar was an engineering student, his father died from complications of carbuncle surgery. At this young age, he became the head of the family, and at the same time pursued the higher education that would lead to his accomplished career. In 1931, he obtained a degree in Civil Engineering from the University of Mysore with a record of high academic achievement.

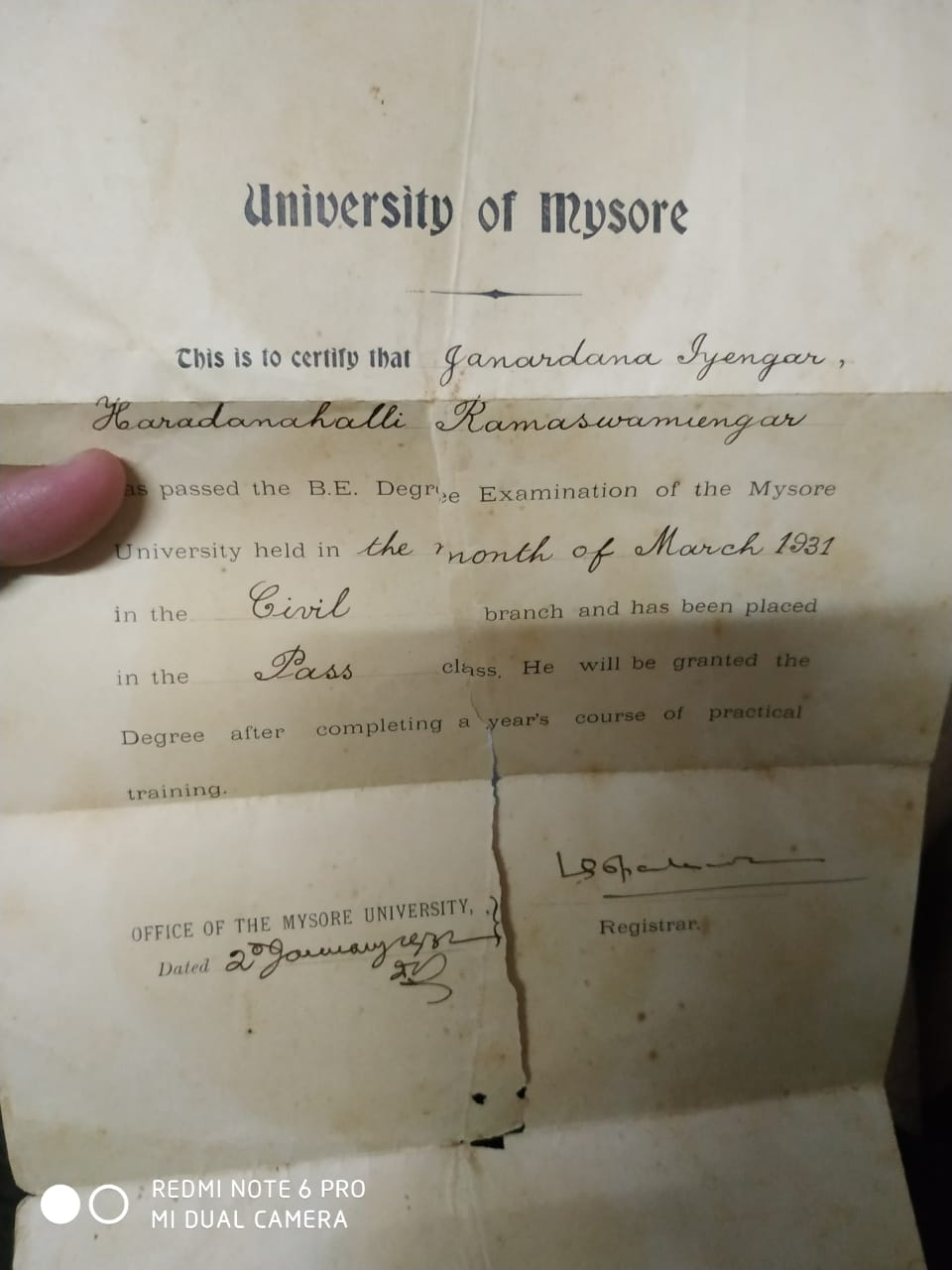
H R Janardhana Iyengar B.E. Civil Engineering from University of Mysore - March 1931

== Career ==
After graduation, he started his career at the Bangalore Public Water Works Department in Malleswaram. Shortly after, he acquired a contract for a house renovation project which resulted in a substantial profit. After these and other initial successes, he formed the Mysore Engineering Company (MEC) with his college friends K.S. Ramaswamy (another engineer and also a maternal uncle), who acted in liaison and accounting capacities, and Thirumalachar, who undertook tasks of execution and project management, with Janardhana Iyengar managing design aspects. The MEC specialised in architecture and design, and construction.

In 1939, partly as a result of the impending World War II, the government Military Engineering Services (MES) wanted to construct prisoners' barracks and other civic amenities at Jalahalli, now a subdivision of Bangalore. The MES sought engineers and awarded numerous contracts to Iyengar's group. The facilities were completed and ready for occupation ahead of schedule. This resulted in additional contracts and further successes for the MEC, such as a contract to build the Hospital Town in Jalahalli; this work was also completed in a record time. In 1940, after the MEC experienced further growth, Janardhana Iyengar moved to Mysore, taking residence with his family in Vontikoppal.

The MEC was charged with the construction of many water tanks for the military with a stipulation that completion of each project would be within one month. The MEC also built many water treatment plants for the army in Mysore state and the Madras presidency. This work of Janardhana Iyengar, Ramaswamy and Thirumalachar was appreciated by the government and the Dewan, Sir Mirza Ismail. The MEC had developed a reputation for performing high-quality work at very reasonable costs. Important treatment plants were at Tambaram, Udumulpet, Arkonam, and Thondebhavi. The Dewan's administration awarded the MEC contracts for other hospitals and various public buildings. Through this, the MEC would construct the Victoria Mental Hospital in Bangalore and the Cheluvamba hospital for Women in Mysore, the General Post Office building in Mysore, cinemas (e.g. the Lakshmi Ranjit in Mysore and the Bramaramba in Chamarajanagar), and bank buildings (e.g., the Bank of Mysore (now the State Bank of Mysore) headquarters in Mysore). About 1946, the MEC constructed the Bank of Mysore Building in Madras (now Chennai); a substantial portion of the profit from this venture was returned to the bank.

In 1946, the MEC was involved in the construction of the power plant for the Munnar hill station in present-day Kerala. From 1944 to 1948 the MEC constructed numerous structures for the Mysore Steel Works, and cement and paper mills in Bhadravati (now in Karnataka). Janardhana Iyengar also designed silos for these projects. From 1948 to 1950, he designed and constructed numerous large ground-level water reservoirs in Bangalore and Mysore (e.g. at Malleswaram and Yadavagiri in Mysore). Janardhana Iyengar's firm designed and constructed overhead tanks, in present-day Kerala, Pune and Uttar Pradesh. Later, the MEC also constructed schools for rural education in Muddahalli) and Nanjangud.

In his tenure as Dewan of Mysore, Mirza Ismail was tasked with improving the state's infrastructure, and he was impressed with Iyengar's vision of using the Kaveri river's water basin for irrigation. In 1953, answering a government request, Janardhana Iyengar prepared a comprehensive proposal for Kaveri water basin irrigation projects (for irrigation not covered by a 1924 agreement, which imposed restrictions on State of Mysore for utilisation of major rivers of the Kaveri basin). This was submitted to the Mysore state government, which would later undertake many of these projects in the 1960s.

From 1956 to 1959 The Mysore Engineering Company constructed the colossal Karnataka University in Dharwar. In this project, cost overruns resulted from demands to make the exterior of buildings veneered with polished granite: the slabs had to be obtained from the Doddaballapur quarry. The company was not reimbursed for this extra cost due to a lack of political influence with the government. The MEC incurred a severe financial loss and would thereafter be closed. Janardhana Iyengar and his partners would later form the Associated Mysore Engineering Company (AMEC) around 1958.

By 1958, Janardhana Iyengar's engineering enterprise had otherwise achieved great success. With his partners, he formed another company, Mysore Concrete Construction (MCC), which, starting in 1961 would design and construct a reinforced concrete construction (RCC) power channel for the Sharavati Hydroelectric Project. This was then the biggest hydroelectric project undertaken in Karnataka. The state government invited bids to build water conductor systems, and bids were returned from numerous construction firms, including some in the United States and the United Kingdom. After studying the requirements for this project Iyengar designed the system and his design was adopted, at considerable savings to the state. The power channel, which extends from the Sharavathi river's Linganamakki Dam to the Penstock entry point to feed 9 turbines, is lengthy and also covered at many places. Iynegar's economical management and design skills earned the MCC large successes, as well as a good reputation with other engineers. The channel was completed in three years, in 1964.

In 1961, the University of Mysore invited tenders for design and construction of a campus at Manasagangotri. The MCC won this contract and the work was sublet to the AMEC (then a partner company). Janardhana Iyengar's son, B. Rangaraj, designed the complex under his father's guidance. The project was successfully completed on time and budget, and the university (particularly the Registrar, Nickam) commended the work. The campus, on Hunsur Road facing the picturesque Kukkarahalli lake, remains today a scenic locale, sometimes used for Kannada film shoots.

As an engineering designer, Janardhana Iyengar made various innovations. For example, for Indian Telephone Industries (ITI), he planned large factories using RCC structures, such as arches supported on cantilevered column support: he designed columns safe from arch reaction by using specially designed column footing that would neutralise soil reaction. In 1958, he designed a shell roof for ITI as part of a large factory construction. Between 1950 and 1956, his firm designed and constructed three cinema theatres with RCC trusses in lieu of the standard structural steel frame, given a shortage of structural steel in India. During this period, Iyengar formed an additional engineering company, the United Engineering Corporation. As director, he designed aircraft hangars made of RCC girders, and not of steel, as was common practice. In the 1950s, Iyengar would become a founding partner of an additional company Mysore Chip Boards.

After a gradual retirement, in the late 1960s, Janardhana Iyengar helped his sons to form Bharat Engineering Corporation, and would act as an adviser and managing director of that company. The first big project for this company was construction of a novel pedestrian subway at the KR market in Bengaluru Pete in 1967. Under his guidance, his sons would undertake the construction of large water treatment plants from 1962 to 1978.

Janardhana Iyengar was one of the earliest fellows of the Institution of Engineers and chairman of the Institution's Mysore Local Centre in 1966–67. He was a co-founder of the National Institute of Engineering and member of its Governing Council. The NIE maintains an endowed scholarship in his memory, awarded to the student with the highest cumulative marks through all semesters.

== Personal life ==
Janardhana Iyengar and his wife, Indiramma Iyengar, had five sons—B.K. Ramaswamy (born 1934), B.J. Srinivas (1938), B. Rangaraj (1940), M. J. Krishnamurthy (1942) and M. J. Prakash (1944)--and two daughters: J. Rathna (wife of K. K. Srinivasan; 1936) and J. Lavanya, born in 1950. They had fifteen grandchildren.

He had a major heart attack in 1973. He was diagnosed with Parkinson's disease in the late 1970s, which was progressively debilitating. He died as a result of pneumonia on 6 February 1991.
