= Sharanagati Gadyam =

Hindu hymn

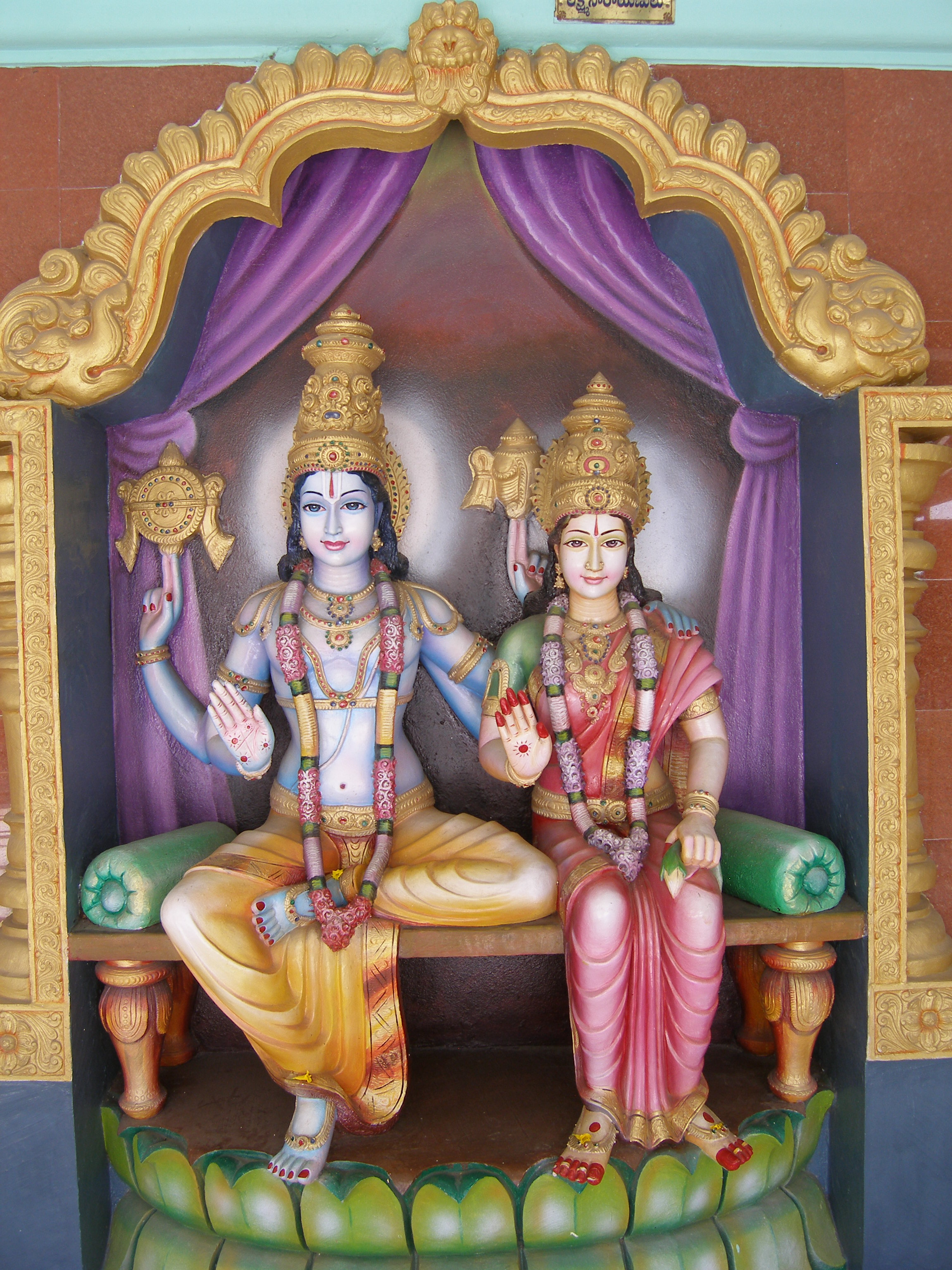
The Sharanagati Gadyam is dedicated to Vishnu and Lakshmi, whose statues are featured in this image at Tirumala

The Sharanagati Gadyam (Sanskrit: शरणागतिगद्यम्, romanized: Śaraṇāgatigadyam) is a Sanskrit prayer, written by the Hindu philosopher Ramanuja towards the end of the 11th century. The Gadya format is a Sanskrit literary form of elaborate prose composition. It is one of the earliest bhakti prayers in the Sri Vaishnava tradition and is the basis for many prayers, such as Raghuvira Gadyam which follows a similar style. It is recited in the 108 Divya Desam temples, including Srirangam.

== Composition ==
According to Sri Vaishnava tradition, Ramanuja (11-12 century) and his disciples once visited the Ranganatha temple in Srirangam on panguni uttiram, a day in the Tamil calendar month of panguni (phalguna) on the day of the ascension of the star called uttiram. According to tradition, the star uttiram was in ascent when the goddess of the temple, Ranganayaki, (Lakshmi) was born, and also the day she married the god Ranganatha (Vishnu). Ramanuja is regarded to have been inspired by the festivities of the day and subsequently composed three Gadyas: the Sriranga Gadyam, the Sharanagati Gadyam, and the Vaikuntha Gadyam.

The three Gadyas present a progression of prapatti. In the Sharanagati Gadyam, the speaker (Ramanuja) surrenders to Sri and Narayana seeking release from sin and gain eternal service in Vaikuntha. The Sriranga Gadyam is a brief prayer to serve Ranganatha at Srirangam. The Vaikuntha Gadyam describes the devotee's vision of Narayana and Sri in Vaikuntha, seeking to serve them eternally, echoing the Dvaya and Tirumantra.

== Content ==
The Sharanagati Gadyam, unlike the commentaries of Ramanuja on Vedanta, does not have detailed philosophical debates. Instead, it is a pure expression of bhakti and describes a transcendental conversation between Ramanuja and Narayana with Sri (Lakshmi). He first describes the limitless kindness of Sri, and asks that she recommend him to Narayana, viewing the goddess as the accessible nature of God. Then, after her approval, he approaches Narayana and describes him as in the Sriranga Gadyam. He explains that he has committed many sins and is ignorant of philosophy and asks that he be accepted into the list of devotees of Narayana. He only asks that he be blessed so he becomes a supreme devotee, never forgetting to serve Narayana. Pleased by his humility and his total surrender, Sri and Narayana bless him for his single act of surrender, removing his karma and offering him moksha.

== Style ==
The prayer is in prose, with alternating long and short sentences and many adjectival phrases.

== See also ==
- Sriranga Gadyam
- Vaikuntha Gadyam
- Raghuvira Gadyam
