= Vontikoppal =

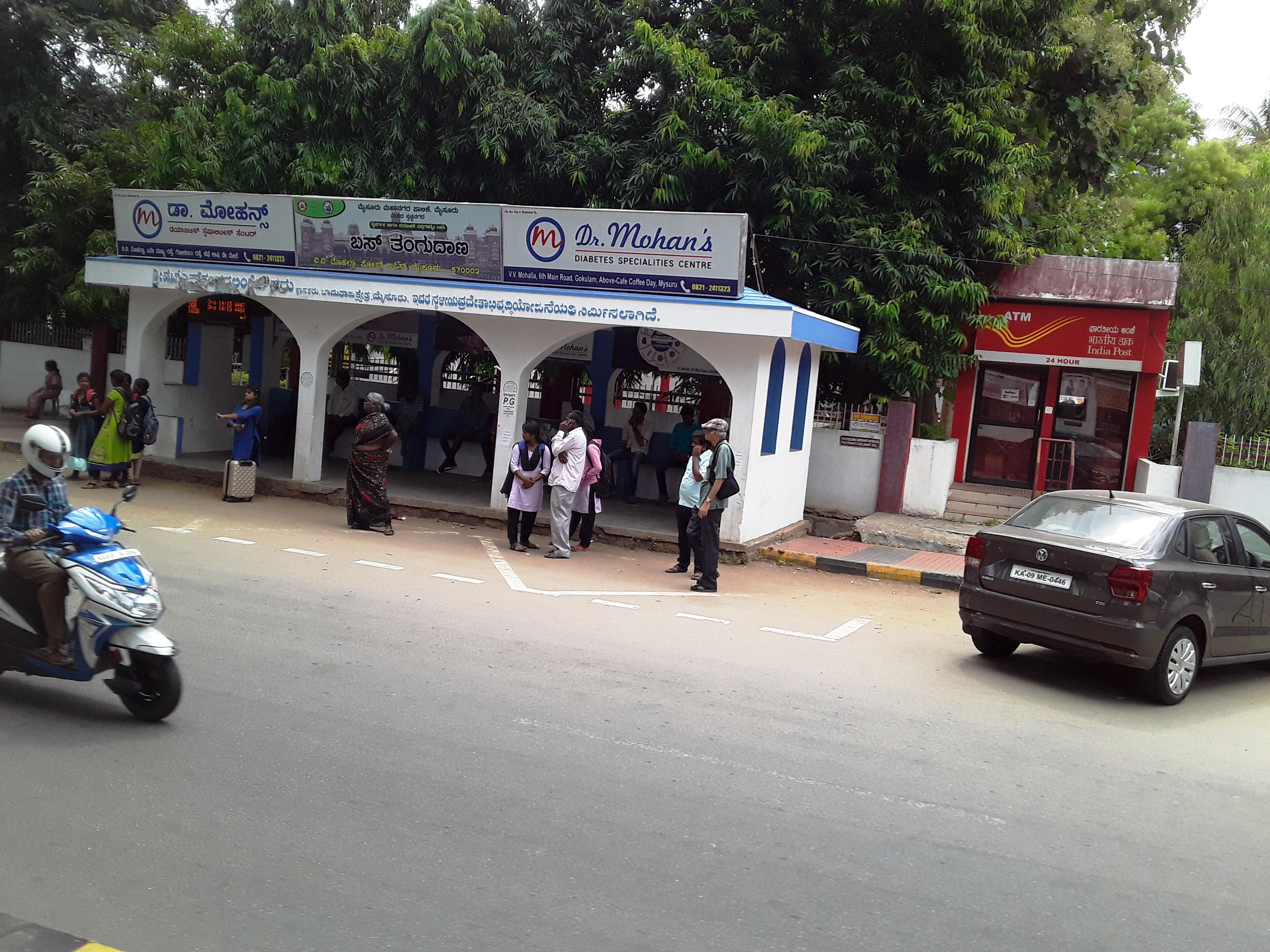
- Nickname: Vontikoppal Post Office
- Interactive map of Vontikoppal
- Coordinates: 12.32686°N 76.63310°E
- Country: India
- State: Karnataka
- District: Mysore
- Time zone: UTC+5:25 (IST)
- PIN: 570002

Vontikoppal or Vani Vilas Mohalla (V. V. Mohalla) is one of the busiest suburbs of Mysore city.

== Temples ==
=== Lakshmi Venkataramana Temple ===
The famous Lakshmi Venkataramana Swamy temple on KRS Road, Vontikoppal was founded by Sri Chikkana Dasa and serves as a centre of Sri Vaishnavism, an ancient sect of Hinduism which advocates the principles of equality, love and affection of every living and non living entities alike. The temple has its origins in a small village called Tirumalasagara Chatra near Pandavapura in Mandya District. The idols Of Sri Lakshmi Venkataramana Swamy and Sri Padmavathi were originally in a small temple in Tirumalasagara.

=== History ===
According to history during the time of Sri Ramanujacharya's stay in Thondanuru and Melukote, Sri Ramanuja himself worshipped these idols. Through the millennium the temple had lost its prominence and was worshipped by the local people of the village. Lord Srinivasa appeared in the dreams of Sri Chikkanna Dasa and asked him to shift the idols to an appropriate place for worship. With the guidance of Sri Sampath Krishna Jois, who was highly respected in the Mysore palace during Nalvadi Krishnaraja Wodeyar's Reign during the erstwhile Mysore Kingdom, Sri Chikkana Dasa shifted the idols to the present location in 1937 after proper legal proceedings to acquire the rights to the idols from the muzrai department.

=== Rituals and Functions ===
Initially the temple's rituals were carried out by Melukote Priests before the temple was handed over to the able care of Bramhatantra Parakala Matha, Mysore. The beautiful Utsava Murthi was given to temple by Parakaal Matt Swamiji Sri Ranganath Brahmatantra Parakaal Maha Swamiji. The temple management strictly follows prevailing religious customs in accordance with Agama and guided by the seer of Sri Brahmatantra Parakaal Swamiji at every stage. The Dharmika Vibhag decides and practices Pooja and Dharmika Vidhi Vidhans of Sri Vaishnava Tradition and conducts of pooja. The temple acts as a centre of Bhakthi movement and accordingly Azhwars Hymns are sung daily in the temple as per Sri Vaishnava Tradition. Today Lord Lakshmi Venkataramana Swamy has Saligrama Haara which consists of 108 Saligramas and these were brought from Nepal and The Lord also has a Diamond Kirita which is made of several kilograms of Gold, Pearls and Precious Gem stones apart from other varieties of different jewellery that he owns and adores.

=== Facilities ===
The temple has a very modern dining hall and a well equipped kitchen where prasadam for 30,000 people can be prepared at the same time. The temple has a beautiful wooden chariot which used only during festival times The Utsava Muruti is taken on the chariot in a festive procession during the Brahmotsavam festival on Vijayadashami of every year from 1972 to 1973. Apart from that the temple also has several small chariots which is used during Utsavas and Special festive occasions. Vondikoppal temple has the necessary infrastructure for facilitating services to devotees which includes a unique function hall which is given to devotees on nominal rent for conducting poojas, religious programs, and marriages and also has its own musical group called Vaadya Vrunda and Bhajana mandali who render musical services to the Lord every day particularly on Maha Mangalarathi (main pooja) held in the afternoon and evening... Another famous temple is the Sri Chandramouleshwara Temple.

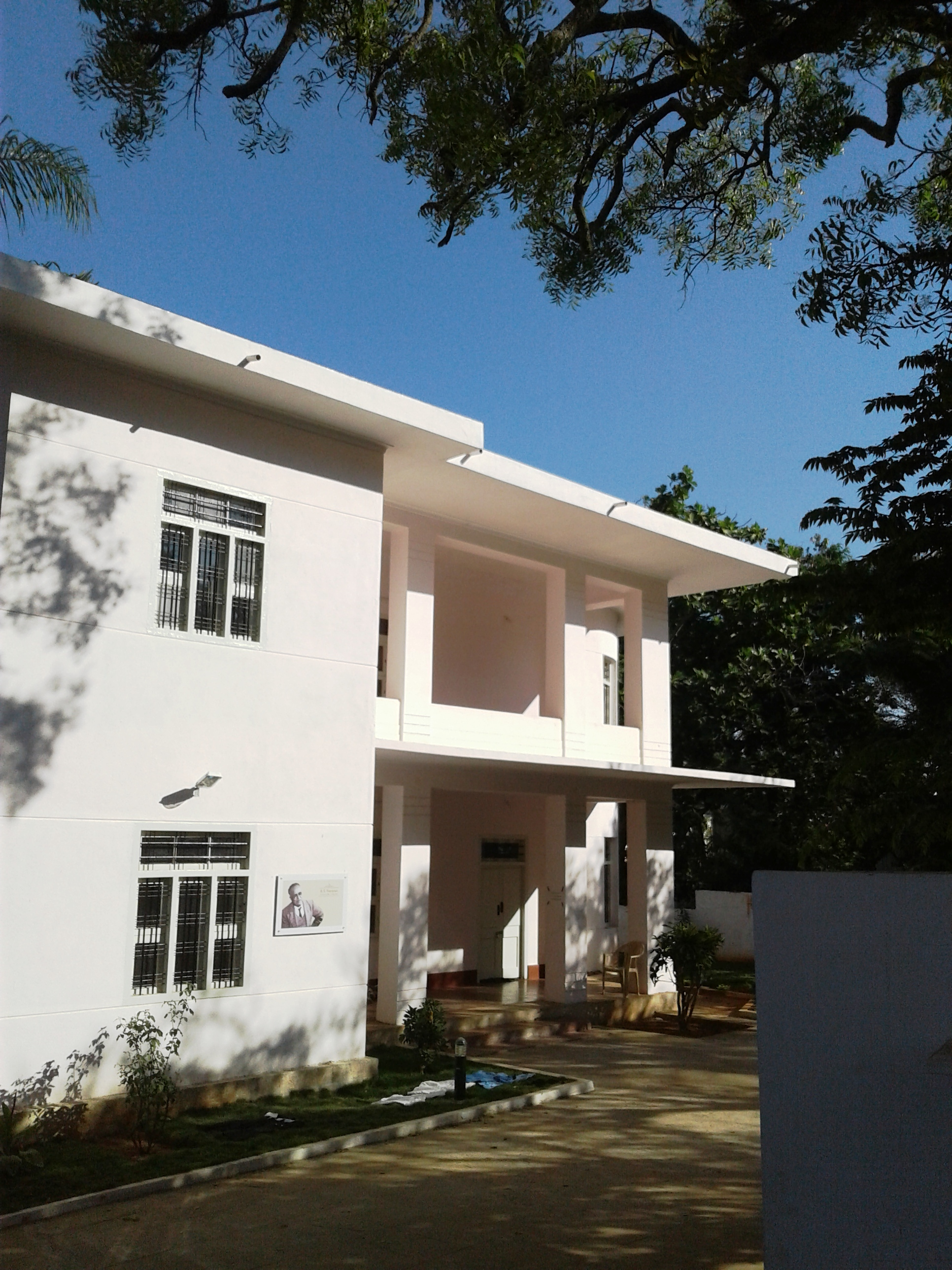
R.K.Narayan Museum

== Cheluvambra Park ==
Cheluvambra Park, Vontikoppal is one of the landmarks of Mysore city. The park is spread in an area of four acres. The park is provided with its own solar energy arrangements. This park is located directly opposite to the Yadavagiri Post Office and All India Radio, Mysore.

== Important Landmarks ==
- Railway Quarters
- Gokulam area
- Jayalakshmipuram
- Kalidasa Road
- Pratham Mysore, non-profit organization
- Ramakrishna School
- Central Food Technological Research Institute campus
- R.K.Narayan Museum, Backside of Akashvani, Mysore. 10.00 am to 5.00 pm. Tuesday Holiday. Free entrance.

== Image Gallery ==
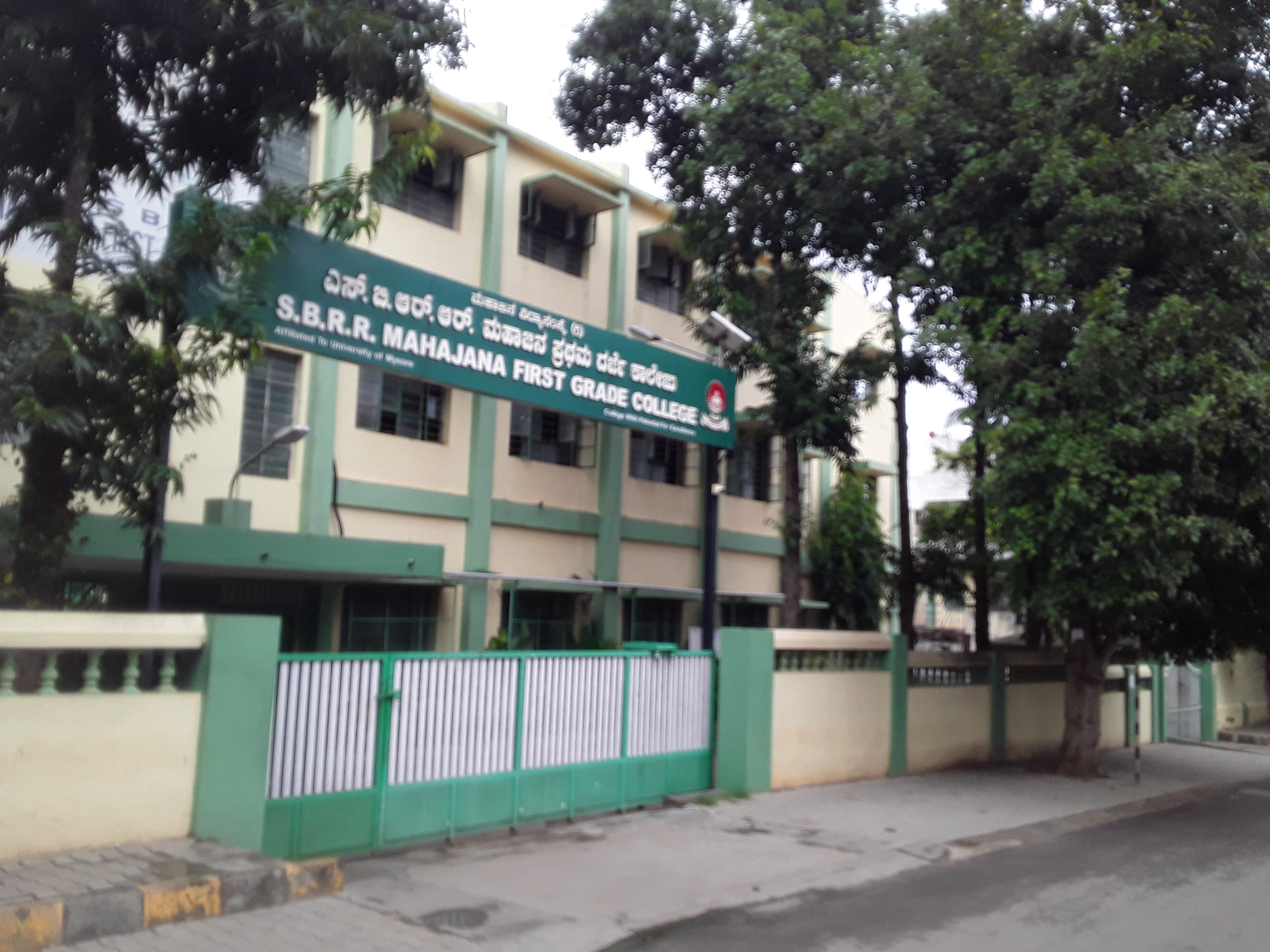
Mahajana College

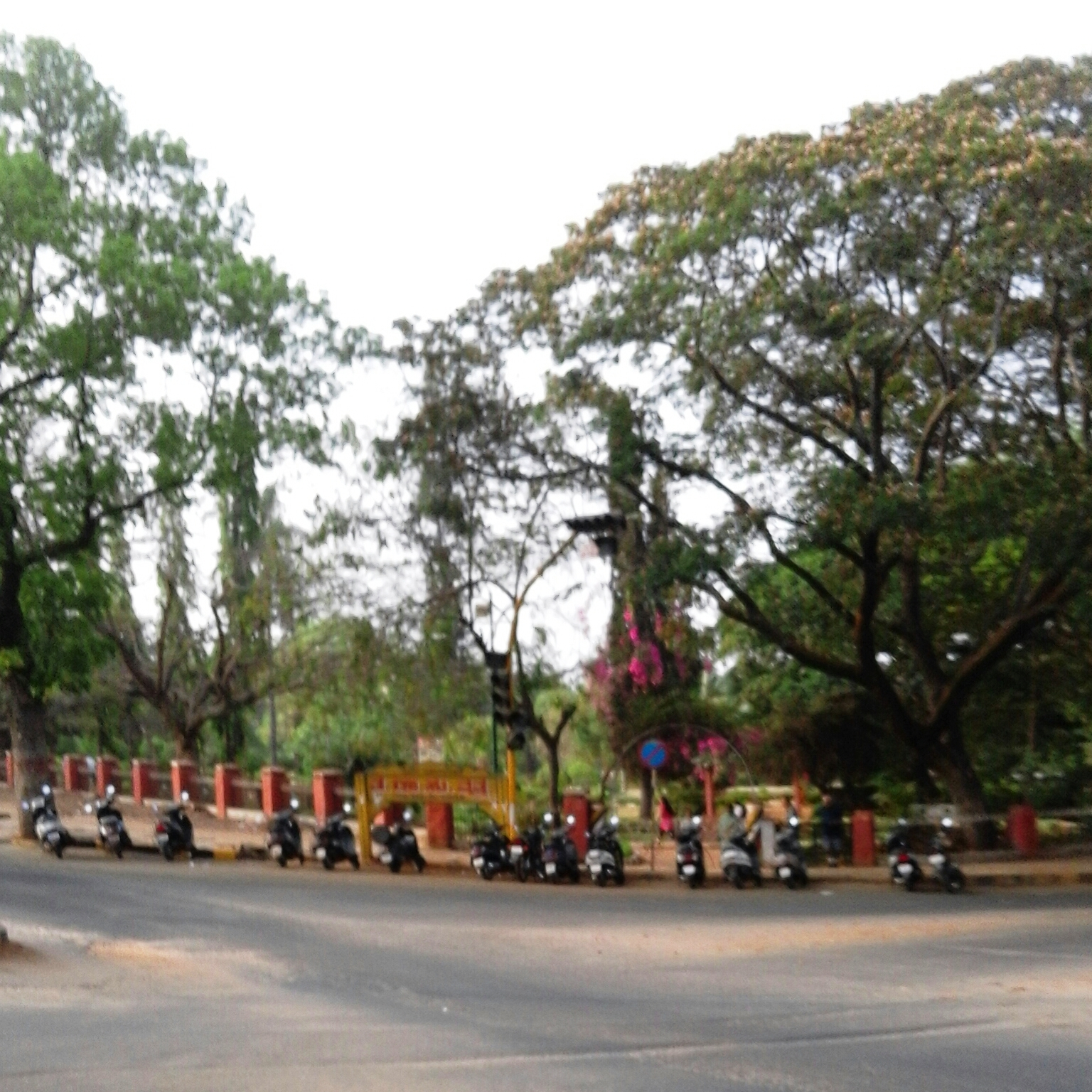
Cheluvera park

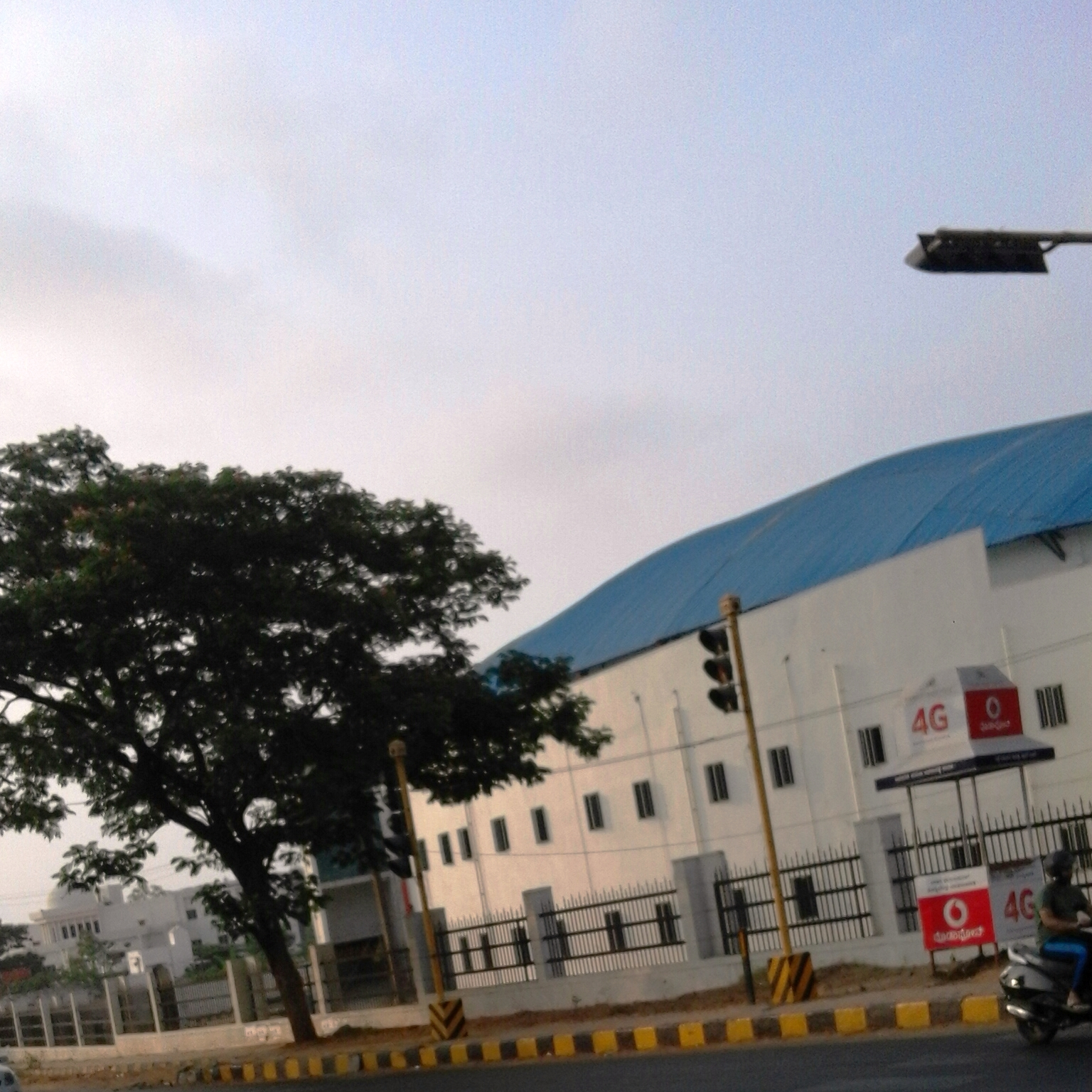
Jayalakshmipuram Junction

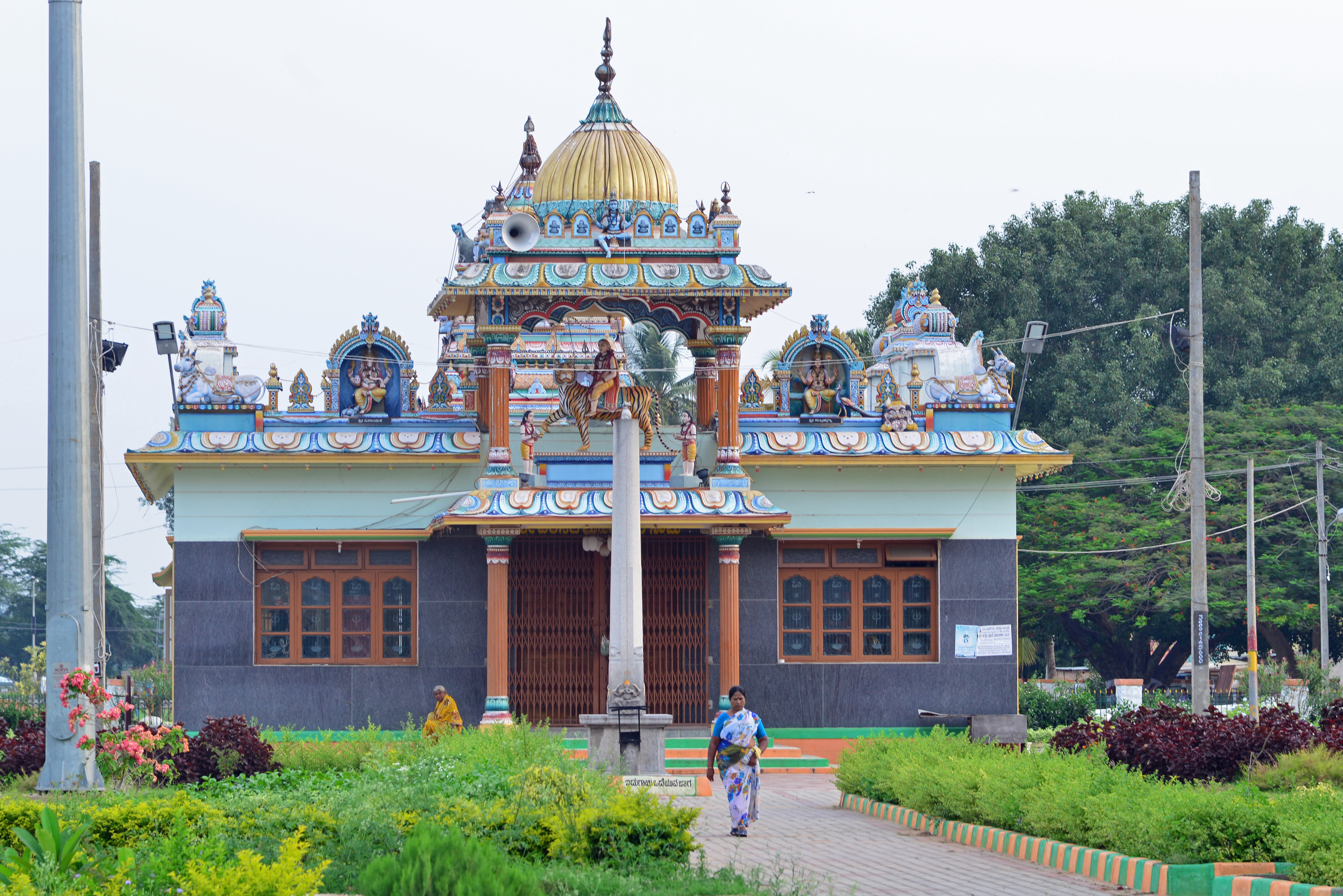
Durga Temple on Adipampa Road

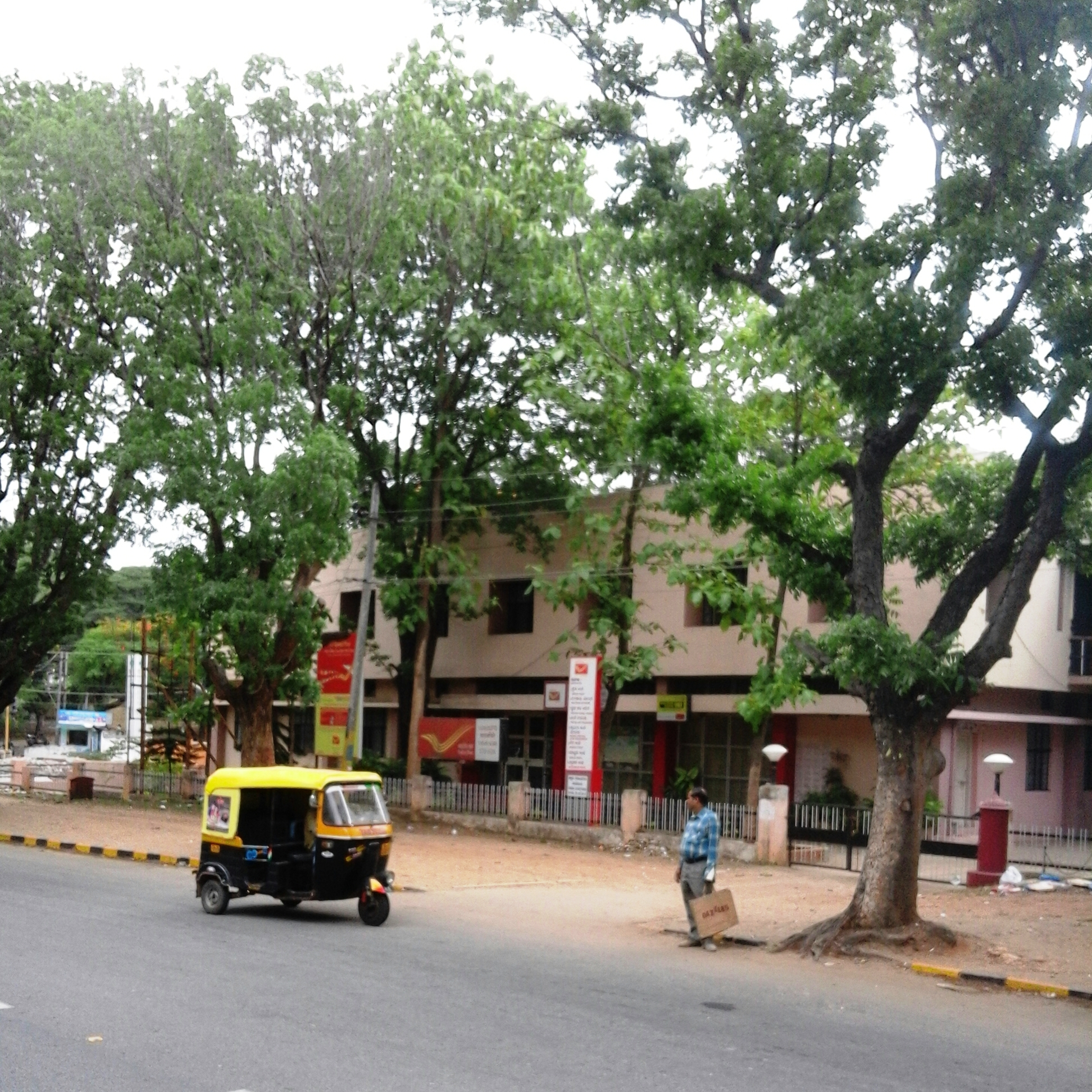
Yadavagiri Post office
