= Pratama =

Pratama may refer to:

- Pratama (surname)
- Pratama Technical School, a college in Purwokerto
- Excelcomindo Pratama, a mobile phone network operator in Indonesia
- Bintang Jasa Pratama, a state award in Indonesia

== See also ==
- Pratham (disambiguation)
