= Pratama (surname) =

Pratama is a surname. Notable people with the surname include:

- Angga Pratama (born 1991), Indonesian badminton player
- Dimas Galih Pratama (born 1992), Indonesian footballer

== See also ==
- Pratama (disambiguation)
