= Raghuvira Gadyam =

Hindu hymn about Rama

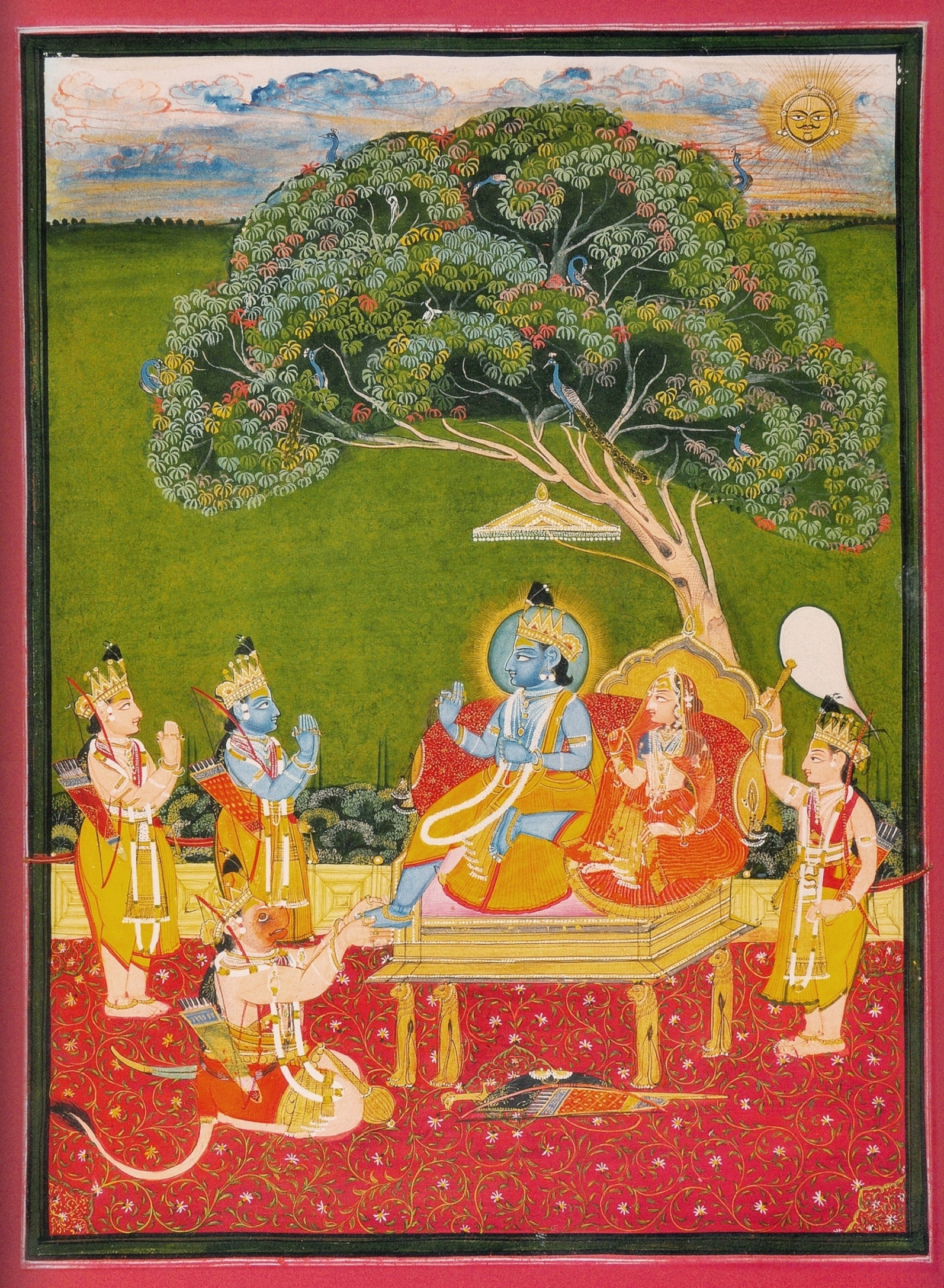
- 19th century painting of an enthroned Rama, National Museum, New Delhi.

Information
- Religion: Hinduism
- Author: Vedanta Desika
- Language: Sanskrit
- Verses: 96

The Raghuvira Gadyam (Sanskrit: रघुवीरगद्यम्, romanized: Raghuvīragadyam), also rendered the Mahavira Vaibhavam, is a Sanskrit hymn written by the Hindu philosopher Vedanta Desika. Comprising 96 verses, the Raghuvira Gadyam extols Rama, an avatar of the deity Vishnu. The hymn describes various episodes of the epic Ramayana, composed in the kathora-sukumara poetic style.

== Etymology ==
Raghuvira is an epithet of Rama, literally meaning, "hero of the Raghu clan", and a gadyam is a form of prose used in Sanskrit literature.

== Description ==
Vedanta Desika is regarded to have composed this work when he visited the Devanathaswamy Temple located at Tiruvahindrapuram. The hymn is recited during the brahmotsavam festival of the deity of the temple. The Sriranga Gadyam of Ramanuja served as an inspiration for this work and is similar in composition.

== Hymn ==
In opening verses of the hymn, the poet extols Rama:

jaya jaya mahāvīra mahādhīra dhaurēya,
dēvāsura samara samaya samudita nikhila nirjara nirdhāritaniravadhikamāhātmya,
daśavadana damita daivata pariṣad abhyarthita dāśarathi bhāva,
dinakara kula kamala divākara,
diviṣadadhipati raṇa sahacaraṇa catura daśaratha carama r̥ṇa vimōcana,
kōsala sutā kumāra bhāva kañcucita kāraṇākāra,
kaumāra kēli gōpāyita kauśikādhvara,
raṇā dhvara dhurya bhavya divyāstra br̥nda vandita,
praṇata jana vimata vimathana dhurlalita dhōrlalita,
tanutara viśikha vitāḍana vighaṭita viśarāru śarāru tāṭakā tāṭakēya

— Raghuvira Gadyam

victory to you, victory to you, O great hero, the foremost of the valiant ones,
whose unmatched valour was praised by the devas during their conflict with the asuras,
who took the form of the son of Dasharatha towards the request of the devas, who were tormented by the ten-headed Ravana
who is the sun of the lotus of the Solar dynasty,
who removed the debt of Dasharatha, who helped Indra in his war,
who was born as the prince of Kosala's daughter and hid the reason for his birth,
who protected the ritual sacrifice of Vishvamitra like it were child's play,
who is saluted by an assembly of divine arrows waiting for your instructions in battle,
who shines with fearsome shoulders that lead to the destruction of the enemies of those who salute you,
who used tiny arrows to slay Tataka and humiliate her sons, preventing them from further torment

== See also ==
- Sriranga Gadyam
- Sharanagati Gadyam
- Vaikuntha Gadyam
