= K. K. Srinivasan =

Kushalnagar Krishnaswamy Srinivasan
- Srinivasan with his wife, Rathna, and two sons, Raja and Vivek
- Born: 20 March 1925; Chennai, Tamil Nadu, India
- Died: 10 July 2009 (aged 84); Bangalore, Karnataka, India
- Resting place: Harishchandra Ghat, Mysore, India
- Citizenship: Indian
- Education: Madras Presidency College
- Occupation: Radar Officer
- Years active: 25
- Employer: Indian Air Force
- Spouse: Rathna Srinivasan
- Children: Raja Kushalnagar, Vivek Kushalnagar
- Parent(s): Krishnaswami Iyengar, Mythiliamma

Kushalnagar Krishnaswamy Srinivasan (20 March 1925 – 10 July 2009) known as K. K. Srinivasan was an Indian radar officer who founded a pre-school for deaf children.

== Early life and background ==
Srinivasan was the second of two children to Krishnaswami Iyengar and Mythiliamma. His older sister was born in 1920, also in Madras. He graduated from high school two years early with honours. However, when he was 19, tragedy struck when his father died due to an undiagnosed ulcer.

== Education ==
Srinivasan spent three years (1942–45) at Madras Presidency College (now known as The Presidency College, Chennai) where enrolled in the Physics (Honors) graduate programme. He was not only successful in his academic studies, but he also excelled in athletics, becoming the college's mile-running champion, taking part in championship boxing tournaments and being named College Athlete of the Year. he also excelled in the University Officers Training Core (U.O.T.C.), where he rose to be named an Under-Officer, the highest rank open to student cadets. After university, he worked in private industry, marketing Japanese industrial products. After a serious train accident in 1950, he switched careers and joined the Indian Air Force as a commissioned officer in the engineering services in 1951.

== Air force career ==
He entered the Indian Air Force on 6 Oct 52, as a commissioned officer in the Technical Branch as an Aeronautical Engineer. He was rapidly promoted to the position of Instructor at the Air Force Technical College. There, he moulded Trainee Officer Engineers with civil career experience Engineers into defence staff following appropriate discipline and regulation. He was then promoted to Commanding Officer of Signals units for two successive terms. In his second term, he officiated as Commanding Officer of a Ground Training School with more than 1000 trainees. Before retiring he was on the Directing Staff of the Management Faculty for the Technical Officers Management Course.

He served in three wars, the Indo-Chinese war in 1961, the Indo-Pakistan war of 1965 and the Indo-Pakistan-Bangladesh war of 1971, and retired from the Air Force on 30 October 1975 having risen to the rank of Wing Commander.

== Deaf education ==
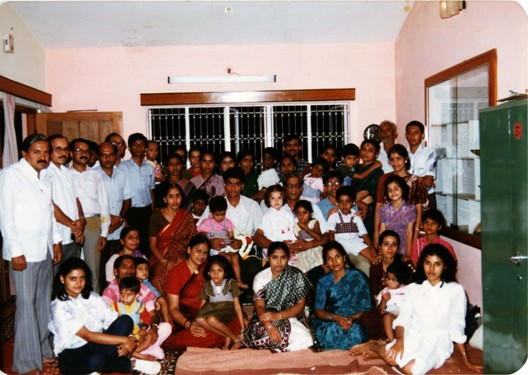
Wing Commander K. K. Srinivasan Preschool for the Deaf

When his son Raja was found to be deaf, Srinavasan decided to take premature retirement from the Air Force and learn more about deaf education so as to give maximum support and growth opportunities for Raja. Initially, Raja was enrolled at the Bala Vidyalaya school in Madras (now Chennai), but then decided to move to Mysore to get services from the All India Institute of Speech and Hearing. He then realised that there was an immediate need for a school which was not expensive and would add to the demand for hearing-impaired education schools. He started a pre-school for the hearing impaired children which he named Helen Keller Pre-school for the Deaf and Hard of Hearing, after the famous deaf-blind author, activist and lecturer Helen Keller. The school was initially started in Mysore at the first floor of Srinivasan's house in the International Year of the Handicapped in 1980. In the 1990s, he successfully applied for City government (Mysore Urban Development Authority) grants to get land and build a school and dormitory for deaf children and their parents, which became the institute for the Mother and the Deaf Child. By the 2000s, he had semi-retired from school administration, but guided and often came to school during festivals and visits by important dignitaries, and gave speeches urging the parents to keep focused and dedicated. Subsequently, the Institute for the Mother and the Deaf Child has been renamed as 'Wing Commander K. K. Srinivasan Institute for the Deaf and Hard of Hearing'.

== Personal life ==
Srinavasan was nicknamed 'Cakes' by his close friends whilst at university. He married Rathna Janardhana Iyengar (daughter of Indiramma Iyengar and H. R. Janardhana Iyengar) in a grand marriage ceremony in Mysore on 22 March 1954. He had two sons, Raja, born 1970 and Vivek, born 1974.
