= Pratham Mysore =

Non-profit organization in Mysore, India

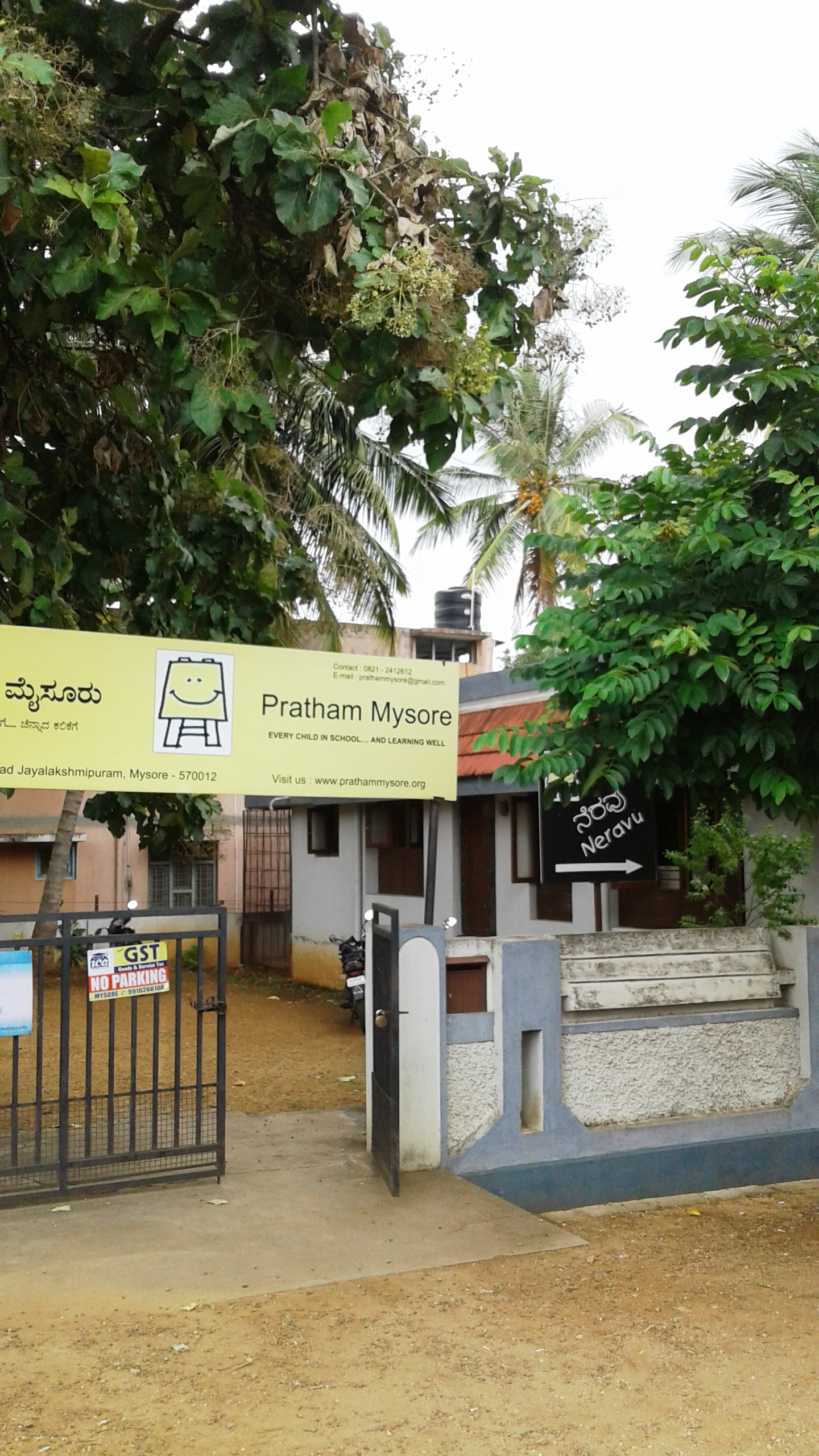
Pratham headquarters in Mysore

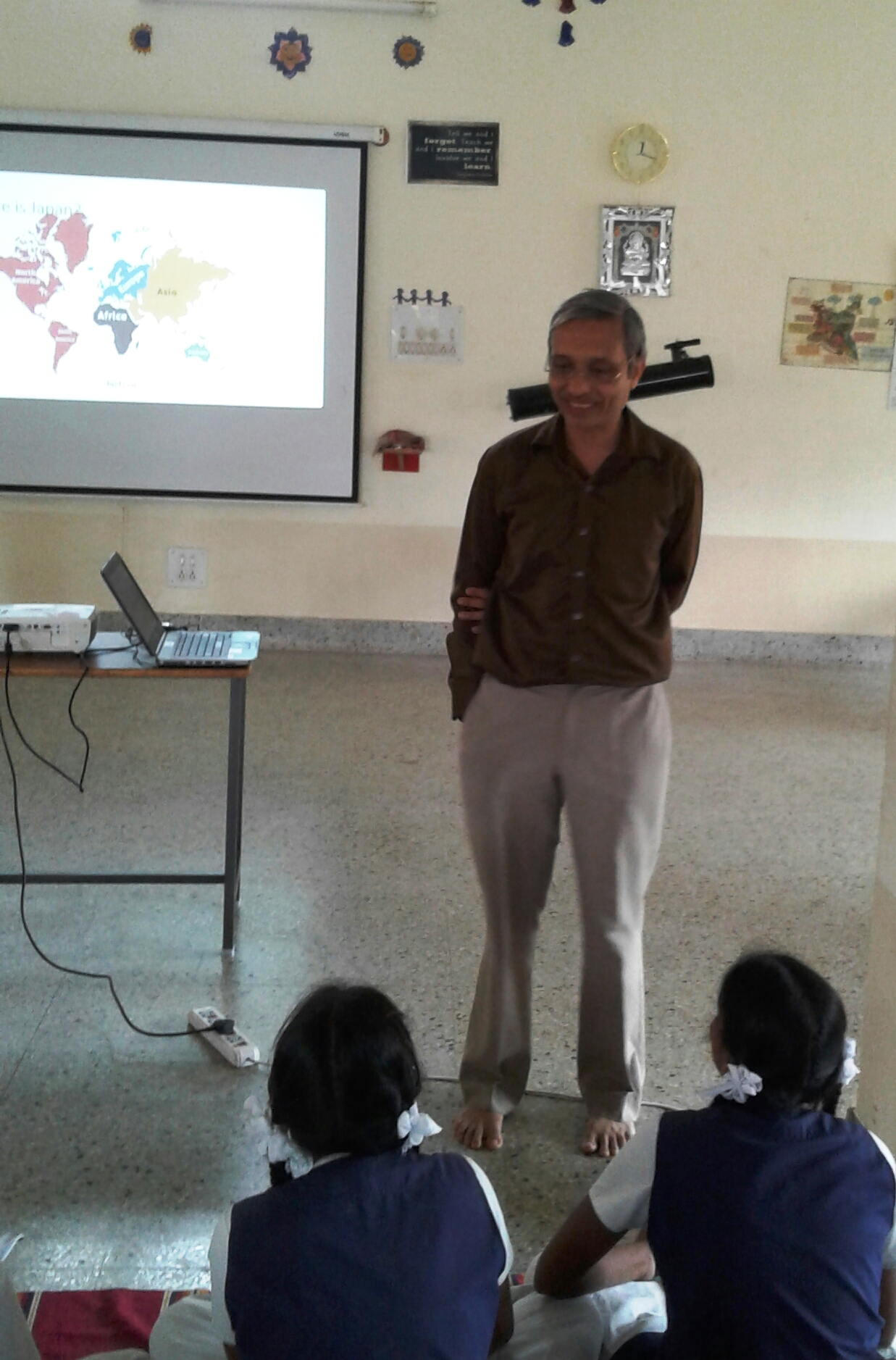
Pratham volunteer Jagadish Shri during Hiroshima day at Mysore

Pratham Mysore is a non-profit organization based in Mysore, Karnataka state, India.

== Activities ==
During 2002, Pratham began working with two slum schools in Mysore district. Very soon, the service of Pratham Mysore was extended to over 800 government schools. Most of these are located in remote villages of the state of Karnataka.

In 2015, Pratham launched a campaign to reach 6,000 villages of Karnataka spread over 30 districts.

== Partnerships ==
Pratham collaborates with other NGOs, communities and people of like-minded attitude.

== Programmes ==
- Kindergarten schools
- Read India programme
- 'Model Village' initiative
- Scholarships to poor students
- Science Workshops
- Career Support

== Mysore offices ==
Pratham's Mysore headquarters is located on Temple Road in Jayalakshmipuram, Mysore. Pratham Activity and Resource Center is located in Mathrumandali Circle, Vontikoppal, Mysore.

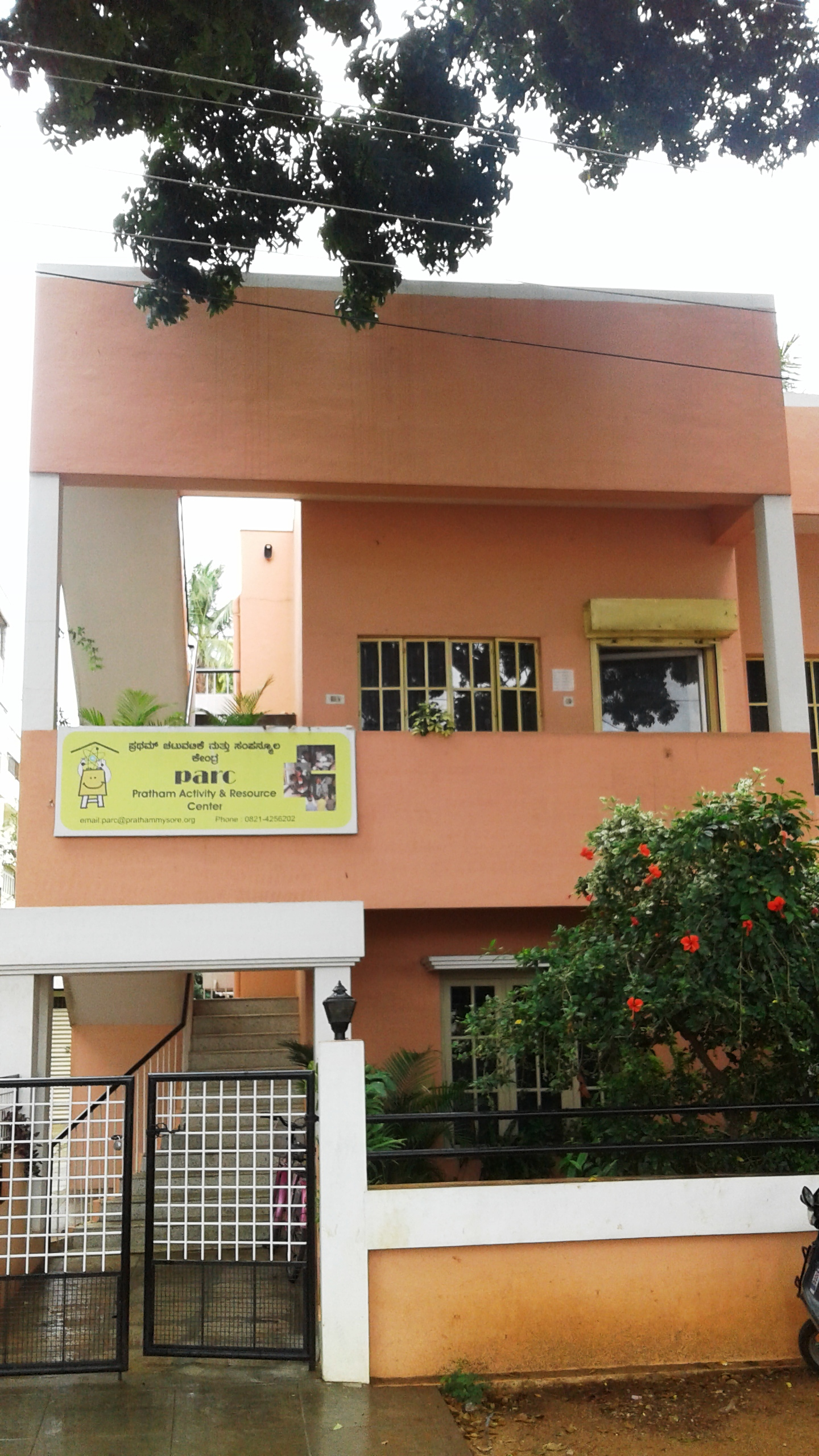
