= SBRR Mahajana First Grade College =

College in Mysore, India

S.B.R.R Mahajana First Grade College (Autonomous)
- Motto: "Education To Excel"
- Established: 1982
- President: Sri. T. Muralidhar Bhagavat
- Principal: Dr. B R Jayakumari
- Staff: 533
- Key people: Vice President: Treasurer: Dr. Hon. Secretary:
- Owner: Mahajana Education Society
- Location: Jayalakshmipuram, Mysore, Karnataka, India
- Coordinates: 12°19′16.2″N 76°37′31.74″E
- Interactive map of S.B.R.R Mahajana First Grade College (Autonomous)
- Website: https://fgc.mahajana.edu.in/

SBRR Mahajana First Grade College (Autonomous) Jayalakshmipuram, Mysore is a College with Potential for Excellence accredited A Grade by N.A.A.C. (National Assessment and Accreditation Council) during its 3rd Cycle and affiliated to University of Mysore. The college was founded in 1982 as a women's college offering B.A. & B.Com. courses. It was admitted to the grant-in-aid in 1987 and in 1988 became a co-educational institution. B.Sc. course was introduced in 1989, BBM course & Bio-technology, Biochemistry & Microbiology combination in B.Sc. were added in 1994 & 2004 respectively. BCA course was introduced in 2009. The College has applied for Autonomy and got the Autonomous status in 2019 from Mysore University.

Two boys were kidnapped on 8 June 2011 from the college premises and murdered by members of Karnataka Forum for Dignity, who sought ransom of 5 crore rupees.

== Courses ==
B.A

- History, Economics, Geography (HEG)
- History, Economics, Sociology (HES)
- History, Geography, Kannada (HGK)
- Criminology, Psychology, Sociology (CPS)

B.Sc.- Bachelor of Science

- Physics, Mathematics, Computer Science (PMCs)
- Biochemistry, Microbiology, Bio-Technology (BMBt)
- Criminology & Forensic science, Psychology, Biochemistry
- BBM-Bachelor of Business Management
- B.Com - Bachelor of Commerce
- B.C.A - Bachelor of Computer Application
- Bachelor in Tourism and Hospitality (BTH)

== Diploma, Certificate and Add-on Courses ==
- Hardware Networking and Maintenance - 6 months
- Drinking Water Quality Standard - 6 months
- Basics in Human Resource Development - 6 months
- Geo-Spatial Technologies - 6 months
- Eng. Language Grammar Usage & Phonetics - 2 sem
- Gandhian Studies - 1 year
- Short term Training in Hotel Management - 2 months
- Diploma in Hotel Management - 1 year
- Advance Diploma in Hospitality & Catering (Community College Courses) - 1 year
- Advance Diploma in Museology (Community College Course) - 1 year
