= Jayalakshmipuram =

Commercial and residential suburb of Mysore, Karnataka, India

Coordinates: 12.322972420983655°N 76.62216422313962°E

Jayalakshmipuram is an urban commercial and residential suburb of Mysore city in Karnataka state, India. Residence of Noted Kannada Poet Javaregowda is located in Jayalakshmipuram.

== Etymology ==
Named after Jayalakshammani (1881–1924), Princess of Chamarajendra Wadiyar X who married her youngest maternal uncle in 1897, Mr. M. Kantaraj Urs, Diwan of Mysore (1919 - 1922). Her residence Jayalakshmi Vilas Palace built for her name in Manasa Gangotri is now a Post-Graduate Centre of the University of Mysore.

== Location ==
Located between Hunsur Road and Kalidasa Road, Jayalakshmipuram is famous for BM Habitat Mall, BM Hospital St Joseph's Primary School, SBRR Mahajana First Grade College.
