= Ranganatha =

Hindu deity

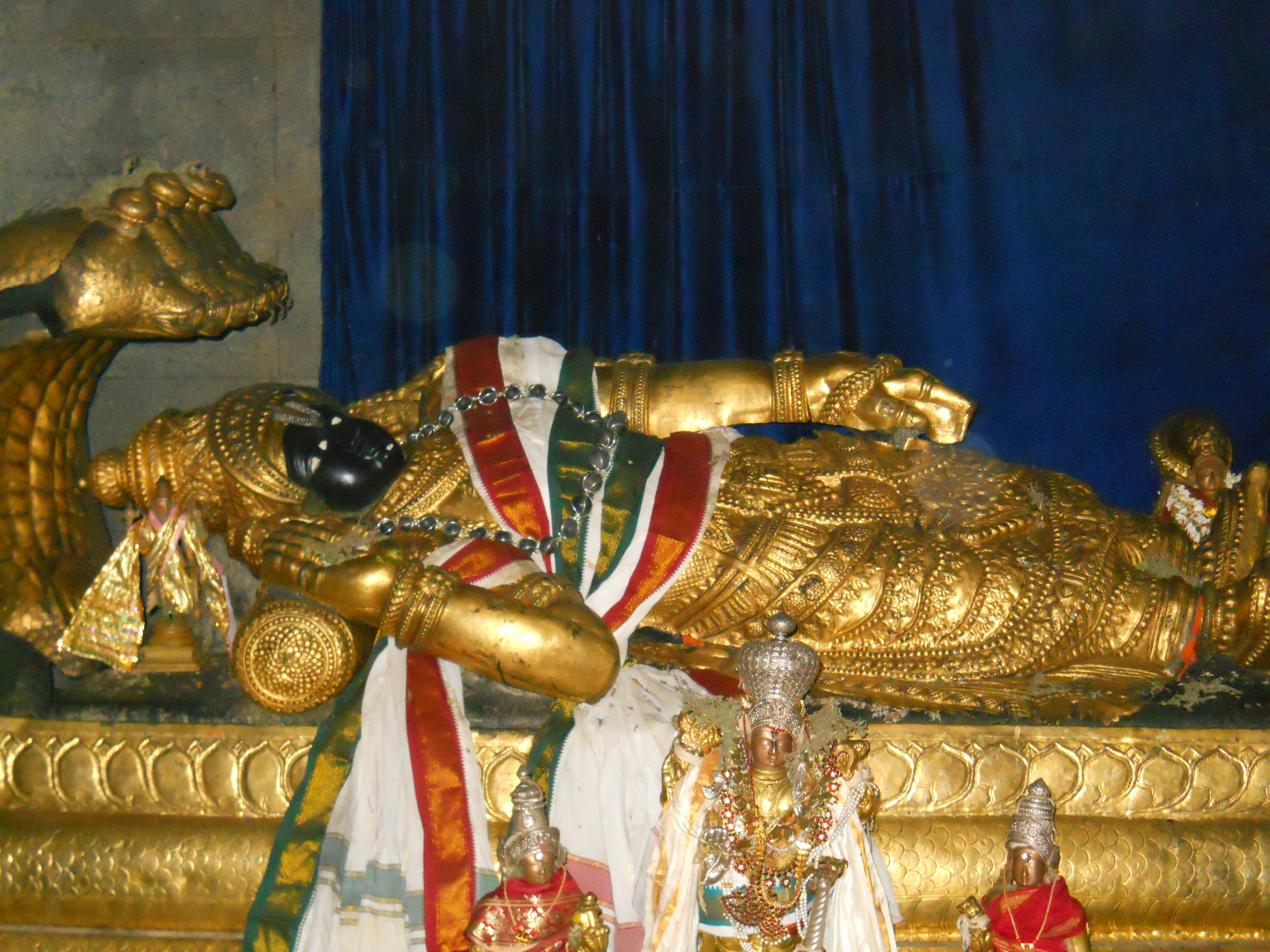
- Murti of Ranganatha, Madyaranga Ranganatha Temple
- Other names: Ranganathar, Rangan, Aranganathar, Sriranga, Tenarangathan
- Venerated in: Sri Vaishnavism
- Affiliation: Vishnu
- Abode: Vaikuntha, Kshira Sagara
- Mantra: Om Namo Narayanaya
- Weapon: Sudarshana Chakra and the Kaumodaki
- Mount: Garuda, Shesha
- Temple: Ranganathaswamy Temple, Srirangam
- Consorts: Ranganayaki as Sridevi, Bhudevi, Niladevi

Ranganatha (Sanskrit: रङ्गनाथ, romanized: Raṅganātha, Tamil: ரங்கநாதர், romanized: Raṅkanāthar) is a form of the Hindu god Vishnu, worshipped as the chief deity of the Ranganathaswamy Temple at Srirangam. This form of Vishnu is of particular importance to adherents of the Sri Vaishnava tradition.

According to this tradition, his chief consort is the goddess Lakshmi in the form of Ranganayaki, alongside her manifestations as Bhudevi and Niladevi.

== Etymology ==
The name Ranganatha (Sanskrit: रङ्गनाथ) is a compound of two Sanskrit terms: ranga, meaning "assembly, stage or arena", and nātha, meaning "lord, master or protector". Etymologically, it translates to "Lord of the Stage" or "Master of the Assembly". In a metaphysical and philosophical context, particularly within the Sri Vaishnava tradition, ranga refers symbolically to the universe (samsāra) as a cosmic stage upon which the divine play (lilā) unfolds.

Textually, the name and its iconic posture (Sayanamūrti) are elaborated in various Pancharatra Agamas and Puranas, such as the Brahmanda Purana, where Vishnu is depicted reclining on the serpent Ādishésha as the ultimate cosmic controller presiding over time and space.

== Iconography ==
The deity is generally depicted in a reclining form of Vishnu, smiling and resting upon Shesha, the king of the serpents, in the Ocean of Milk during the pralaya (the period of cosmic dissolution). This posture is believed to represent the deity's accessibility and his readiness to listen to the prayers and hardships of his devotees.

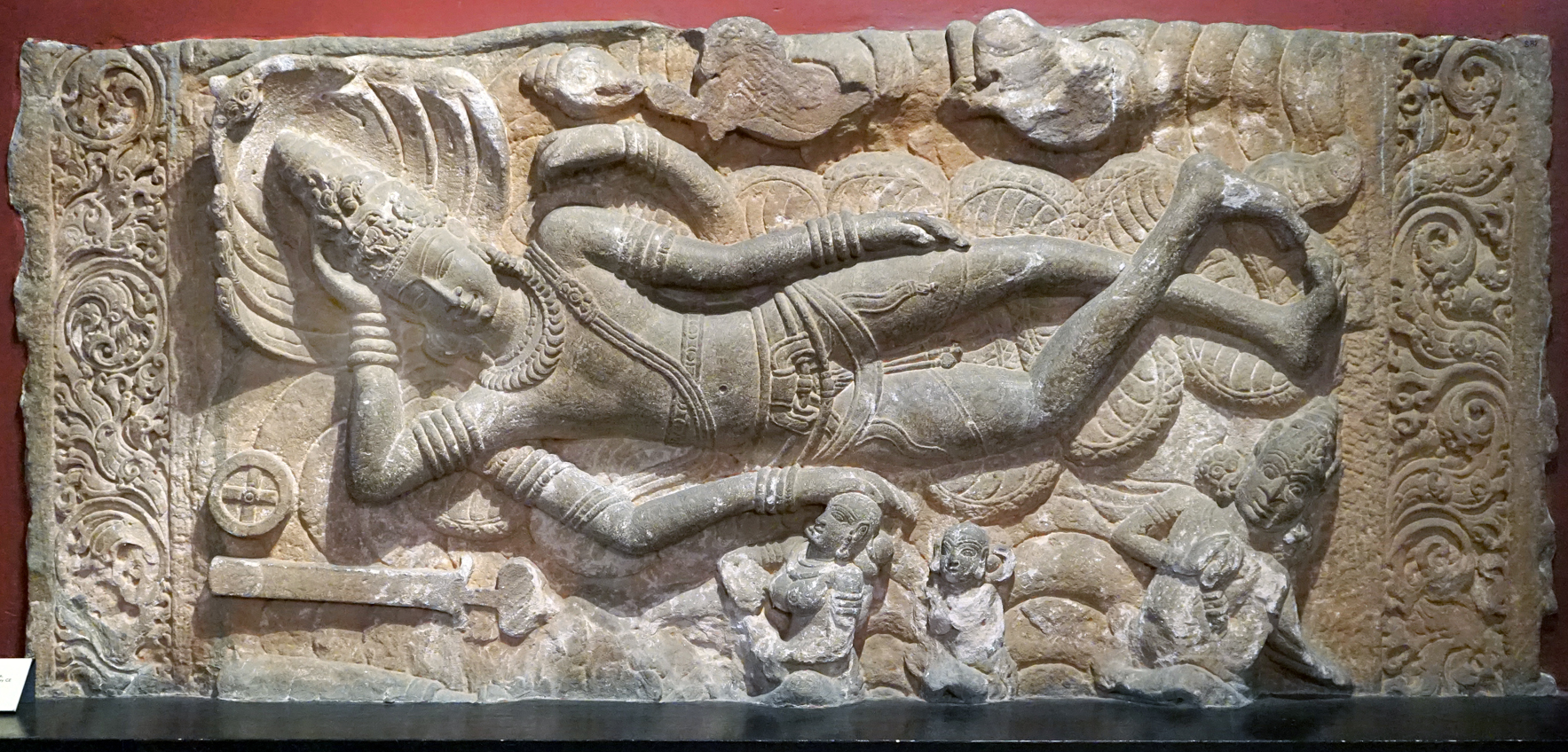
Sculpture of Vishnu as Ranganatha.

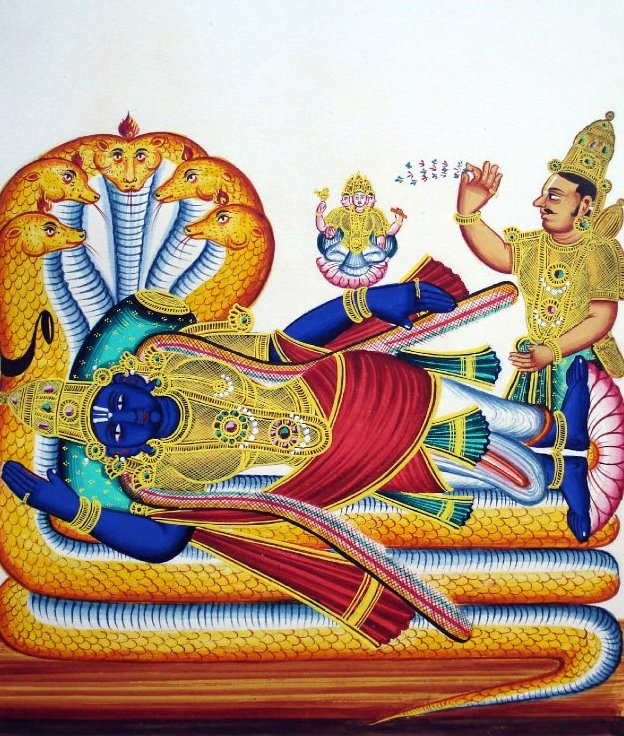
Artistic representation of Ranganatha

== Major Temples ==
The Pancharanga Kshetrams are a group of the five most sacred Ranganatha temples located on the banks of the Kaveri River. In order from upstream to downstream along the Kaveri River, these temples are:

The Ranganathaswamy Temple at Srirangapatna (Adi Ranga); the Ranganathaswamy Temple at Shivanasamudra (Madhya Ranga); the Ranganathaswamy Temple at Srirangam (Kasturi Ranga or Antya Ranga); the Appakkudathaan Perumal Temple at Koviladi (Tiruppernagar in Tamil Nadu); and The Parimala Ranganatha Perumal Temple at Mayiladuthurai (Vatarangam). The Sarangapani Temple at Kumbakonam is cited in place of Vatarangam in some traditional references.

The Ranganathaswamy Temple at Srirangam is considered the primary shrine among the Divya Desams (a group of 108 sacred Vaishnava temples extolled by the Alvars) and stands as the most significant religious centers of the Sri Vaishnava tradition propagated by Ramanuja.

== Sources ==
- Dalal, Roshen (5 October 2011). Hinduism: An Alphabetical Guide. Penguin Books India. pp. 339–. ISBN 978-0-14-341421-6.
- Deshpande, Aruna (2005). India: A Divine Destination. Crest Publishing House. pp. 264–265, 363–64, and 374–75. ISBN 81-242-0556-6.
