= Ranganayaki =

Form of Hindu goddess Lakshmi

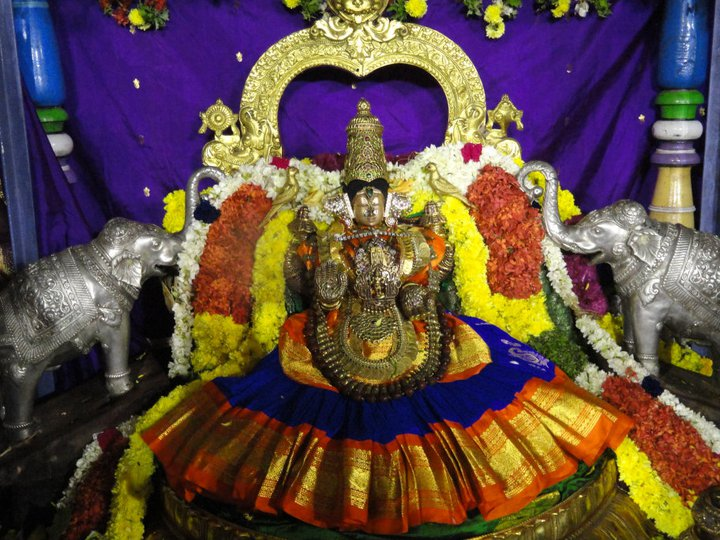
- Murti of Ranganayaki
- Other names: Periya Piratti, Tayar
- Venerated in: Sri Vaishnavism
- Affiliation: Lakshmi
- Abode: Vaikuntha
- Mount: Elephant
- Texts: Naalayira Divya Prabandham
- Temple: Ranganathaswamy Temple, Srirangam
- Festivals: Vaikuntha Ekadashi
- Consort: Ranganatha

Ranganayaki (Tamil: ரங்கநாயகி, Sanskrit: रङ्गनायकी, romanized: Raṅganāyakī, lit. 'Queen/Consort of Ranganatha'), also known by her epithet Tayar, (Tamil: தாயார், romanized: Tāyār, lit. 'Mother') is a Hindu goddess. She is the presiding goddess of the Ranganathaswamy Temple at Srirangam. She is the chief consort of Ranganatha, the tutelary deity of Srirangam, and is a form of Lakshmi, while Ranganatha is considered a form of Vishnu.

== Temple ==
The shrine of the Ranganathaswamy temple has two main idols (mula murtis) and one processional idol (utsava murti), due to the fact that the processional idol was buried under a bilva tree near her shrine during the invasion of the temple by Malik Kafur of the Khalji Dynasty in the year 1323 CE. A wall was erected and her murti was moved from her shrine so that it would not be desecrated. After the plunder, the idol was not found, and the priest of the shrine hastily ordered for a new idol to be created. This idol was the second main idol (mula murti) in the shrine. According to local legend, the goddess appeared in a dream of a devotee and told him where her procession idol (utsava murti) was. The idol was dug up by the devotee and re-installed. The wall covering the original idol was broken and the original idol and the replacement idols are now worshipped grandly. In local belief, the original idol represents Goddess Sridevi and the second idol represents Goddess Bhudevi, the consorts of Vishnu. Unlike other temples, the processional idol of Ranganayaki never leaves her sanctum (garbhagriha). It is a temple custom that the goddess of the temple takes her place beside the god of the temple during processions. In Srirangam, however, the processional idol of Ranganatha is ritually carried by adherents to her sanctum, symbolically representing a husband visiting his beloved wife.

Once a year, on the occasion of Panguni Uttiram, the day in the Tamil month of Panguni when the star Uttiram is in ascension, the divine procession idols (utsava murtis) of Ranganatha and Ranganayaki, come together for a day. They are known together as the divya-dampatigal, (divine couple) existing beyond mortal confines or limitations..
