= Medha Sūktam =

Vedic hymn

Medha Suktam (Sanskrit: मेधासूक्तम्, romanized: Medhasūktam) is a suktam (set of mantras contained in the Vedas) addressed to Medha (wisdom), personified as a goddess. Because goddess Medha is considered as a form of Saraswati, Medha Suktam is quite popular as a hymn to goddess Saraswati; as a prayer seeking wisdom and capability to learn.

There are at least two popular versions of Medha Suktam. One version is a set of six verses from Mahanarayana Upanishad, which forms part of Taittiriya Aranyaka in Krishna Yajurveda. There is one more version comprising nine mantras, which appears as a khila sukta (khilani) to the Rig Veda. There is one more set of five verses in the Atharva Veda, which too reads like a hymn to goddess Medha, but this is not popularly recognized or chanted as such. In essence, Medha Suktam relates to the worship of knowledge visualized as a goddess, and has been commonly chanted as a prayer to Saraswati.

The meaning of the world Medha (in the feminine gender, as used in Medha Suktam) is "power of understanding endowed with consciousness". The other meaning of Medha (in the masculine gender) is Yajna, which is not applicable in this context.

== Content ==
Medha suktam from the Mahanarayana Upanishad is a collective prayer, i.e., the supplicants refer to themselves in the plural. The context suggests that it is recited by a group of students who are pursuing education, spiritual education in particular. It praises the benevolent nature of goddess Medha. It then describes how with the blessings of goddess Medha, one could become a rishi or a brahmajnani (knower of Brahman). The hymn also beseeches Indra, Agni, the two Ashvins, Surya, and also goddess Saraswati to grant Medha (wisdom).

Another popular version of Medha Suktam, which is a supplementary sukta to the Rig Veda, is an individual prayer. It requests sage Angiras, the Saptarishis, Indra, Agni, Brahma, Varuna, the Ashvins, and goddess Saraswati to bestow Medha.

The five verses from Atharvaveda too address a goddess called Medha, and also seek Medha (wisdom) from Agni, Varuna, and Vayu.

The Medha Suktam from the Vedas are from the centuries before the common era, when the conceptualization of Saraswati as the goddess of knowledge. Though the two popular versions of Medha Suktam explained above also invoke a goddess called Saraswati, the emphasis is more on goddess Medha and on Medha (knowledge) itself. However, as goddess Medha commands the same role as Saraswati, the verses from the Vedas referred to as Medha Suktam, have been popularly accepted and recited as prayers to goddess Saraswati since millennia, with appropriate invocation and conclusive verses added to them.

== See also ==
- Historical Vedic religion
- List of suktas and stutis
- Nasadiya Sukta (Hymn of Creation)
- Agganna Sutta — a Buddhist critique
- Varna (Hinduism) and Caste system in India

== Sources ==
- Koller, John M. (2006), The Indian Way: An Introduction to the Philosophies & Religions of India (2nd ed.), Pearson Education, ISBN 0131455788
- Visvanathan, Meera (2011), "Cosmology and Critique: Charting a History of the Purusha Sukta", in Roy, Kumkum (ed.), Insights and Interventions: Essays in Honour of Uma Chakravarti, Delhi: Primus Books, pp. 143–168, ISBN 978-93-80607-22-1
