= List of suktas and stutis =

This article contains a list of Hindu hymns, known as suktas, stotras, or stutis.

== Sūktas ==
=== Main Sūktas ===
- Ā no Bhadrāh Sūktam
- Bhagya Sūktam / Pratah Sūktam
- Brahmanaspati Sūktam
- Agni Sūktam
- Devī Sūktam
- Dhruva Sūktam
- Durga Sūktam
- Ganapati Sūktam / Ganesha Sūktam
- Gosamūha Sūktam
- Gostha Sūktam
- Hanumana Sūktam
- Hiranyagarbha Sūktam
- Krityapaharana Sūktam / Bagalamukhi Sūktam
- Kumāra Sūktam
- Lakshmi Sūktam
- Manyu Sūktam
- Medha Sūktam
- Nakshatra Suktam
- Narasimha Nakha Stuti
- Nārāyaṇa Sūktam
- Nasadiya Sūktam
- Nashta Dravya Prapti Sūktam
- Navagraha Sūktam
- Oshadhi Sūktam
- Pavamana Sūktam
- Pitru Sūktam
- Pṛithvī Sūktam / Bhumi Sūktam
- Puruṣa Sūktam
- Rakshoghna Sūktam
- Rashtra Sūktam
- Ratri Sūktam
- Samjnana Sūktam
- Samvada Sūktam / Akhyana Sūktam
- Sarasvatī Sūktam
- Sarpa Sūktam
- Shraddha Sūktam
- Śivasaṅkalpa Sūktam
- Surya Sūktam / Saura Sūktam
- Śrī Sūktam
- śrīviṣṇu stuti
- Svasti Sūktam
- Tantroktadevi Sūktam
- Trisuparna Sūktam
- Varuna Sūktam
- Vastu Sūktam
- Vishwakarma Sūktam
- Vishnu Sūktam

=== Other Sūktas ===
- Aksha Kitana Ninda Sūktam (RV X.34)
- Aghamarshana Sūktam
- Ayushya Sūktam
- Balitha Sūktam
- Bhu Sūktam
- Brahma Sūktam
- Ekamatya Sūktam
- Go Suktam
- Krimi-samhara Suktam
- Mritasanjeevana Sūktam
- Mrittika Sūktam
- Mrityu Sūktam
- Nadistuti Sūktam
- Nīla Sūktam
- Parjanya Sūktam
- Rishabha Sūktam
- Roga Nivarana Sūktam
- Rudra Sūktam
- Sannyāsa Sūktam
- Shanna Sūktam
- Uttaranarayana Anuvaka
- Vāc Suktam

== Stutis ==
- Dashavatara Stuti
- Durga Stuti
- Ganesha Stuti
- Hari Stuti
- Krishna Stuti
- Lakshmi Stuti
- Nakha Stuti
- Narasimha Stuti
- Ramesha Stuti
- Sahasrara Stuti
- Shiva Stuti
- Shree Ram Stuti
- Shri Rudram
- Sri Stuti
- Srinivasa Stuti
- Vayu Stuti
- Vishnu Stuti
- Vyasa Stuti

== Stotras ==
- Annapurna Stotra
- Ashtalakshmi Stotra
- Asitakrutam Shivastotram
- Bhaktāmara Stotra
- Dakshinamurti Stotra
- Dvadasha Stotra
- Hayagriva Stotra
- Hari Stotra
- Kanakadhara Stotra
- Khadgamala Stotra
- Mahishasura Mardini Stotra
- Markandeya Stotra
- Maruti Stotra
- Nataraja Stotra
- Rama Raksha Stotra
- Shiva Mahimna Stotra
- Shiva Tandava Stotra
- Shiva Panchakshara Stotra
- Uvasaggaharam Stotra
