= Sri Vidya Temple =

Coordinates: 42°59′51.6″N 77°42′14.0″W

Sri Vidya Temple Sri Rajarajeswari Peetam
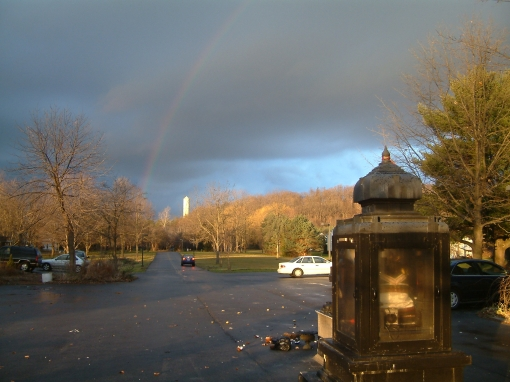

Religion
- Affiliation: Hinduism
- Deity: Rajarajeswari (Tripura Sundari)

Location
- Location: Rush
- State: New York
- Country: United States
- Interactive map of Sri Vidya Temple; Sri Rajarajeswari Peetam

Website
- https://www.srividya.org/sri-rajarajeswari-temple/

The Rajarajeswari Peetam in Rush, New York is a Sanathana Dharma temple that practices the teachings of Shri Vidya. It is managed by the Sri Vidya Temple Society. Sri Chaitanyananda Natha Saraswathi (known as Aiya) is the peetathipathy of the temple along with his wife Gnanamba (Amma). Aiya is a disciple of Sri Amritananda Natha Saraswathi, the peetathipathy of the Devipuram temple.

Rajarajeswari Peetam was founded in Zambia, then moved to the Aiya's home in Rush in New York state before the current temple was constructed. The temple and its community have been the subject of a monograph by Corrine Dempsey, American professor of religion.

== Gallery ==
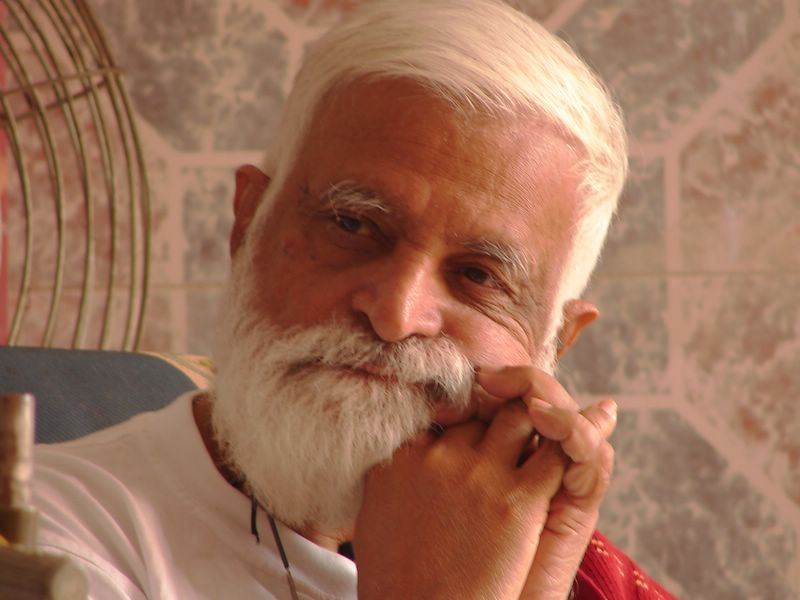
This is Sri Amritananda Natha Saraswathi

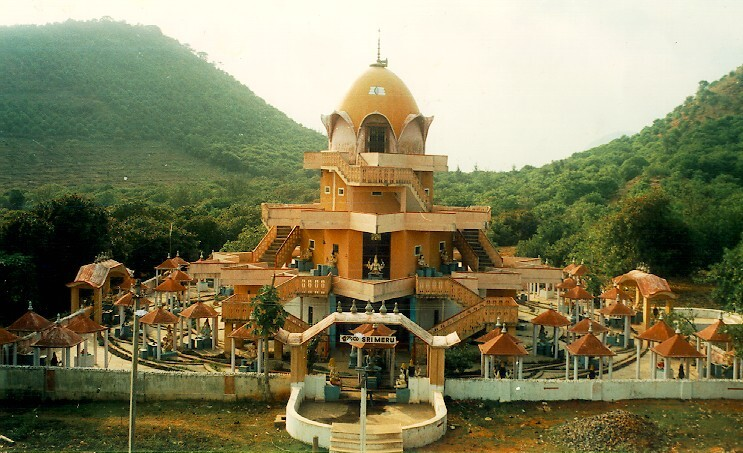
This is the Devipuram Temple

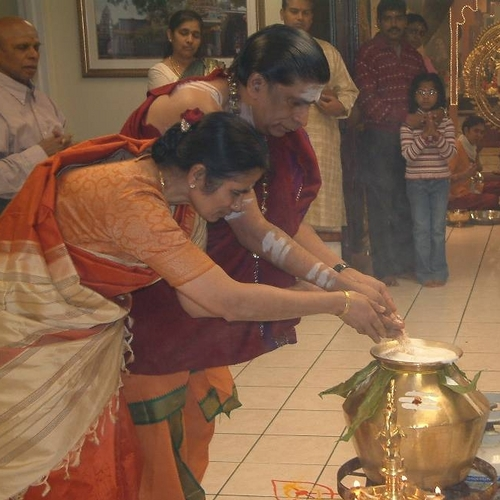
This is Aiya and Amma doing Puja

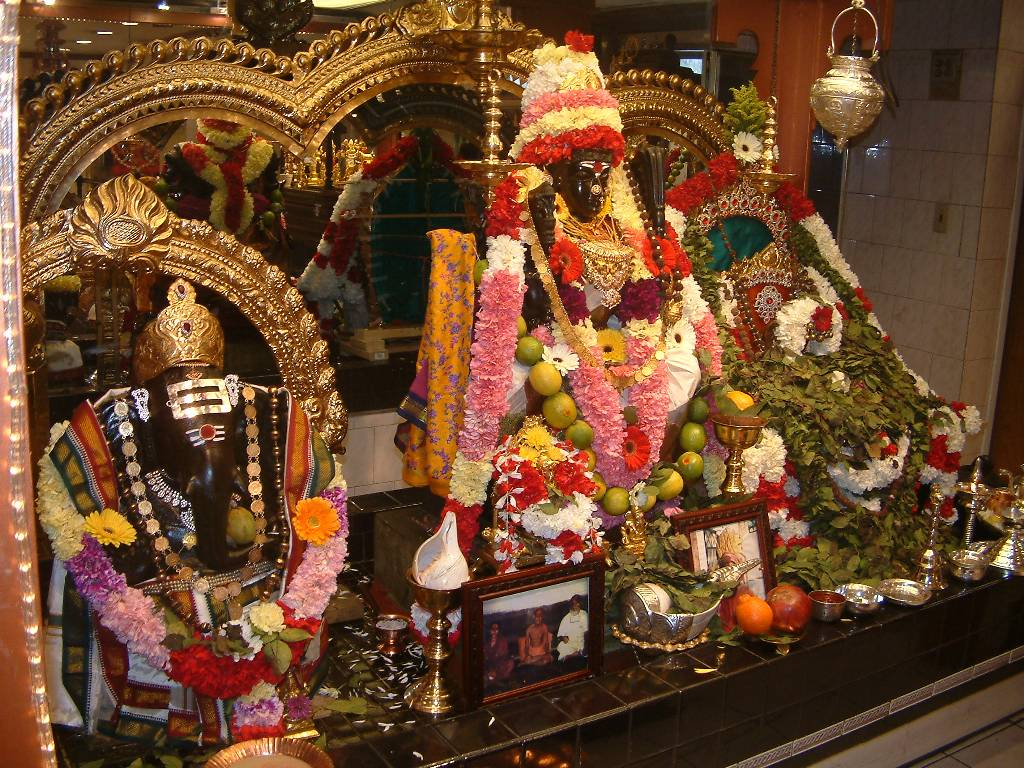
These are the main deities in the temple

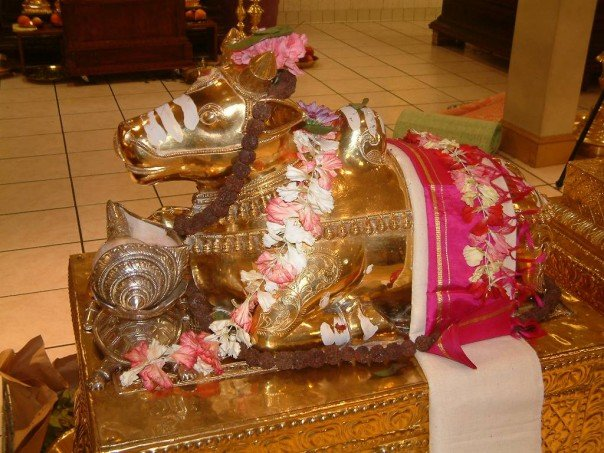
This the Nandi at the Temple

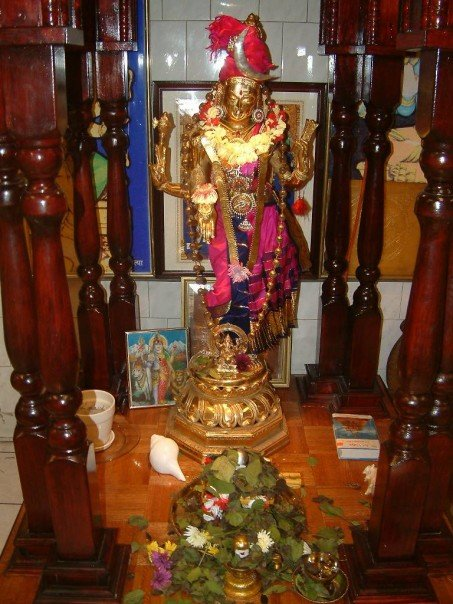
This is the Ardinareswara at the temple

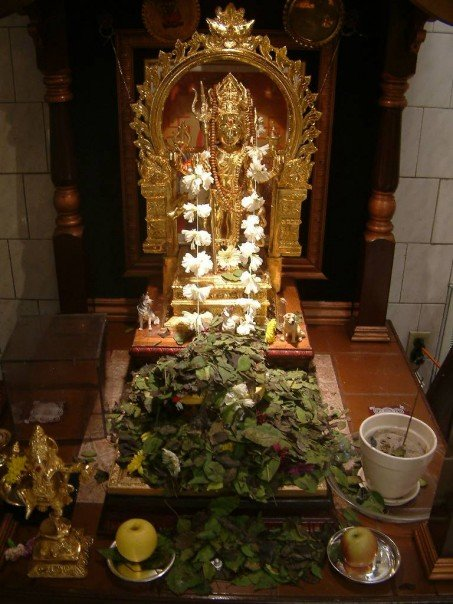
This is the Bhairava at the temple

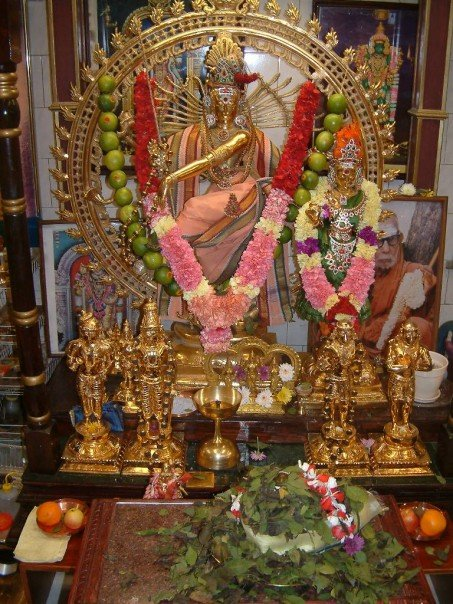
This is the Nataraja and Sivakami along with 4 saints under them at the temple

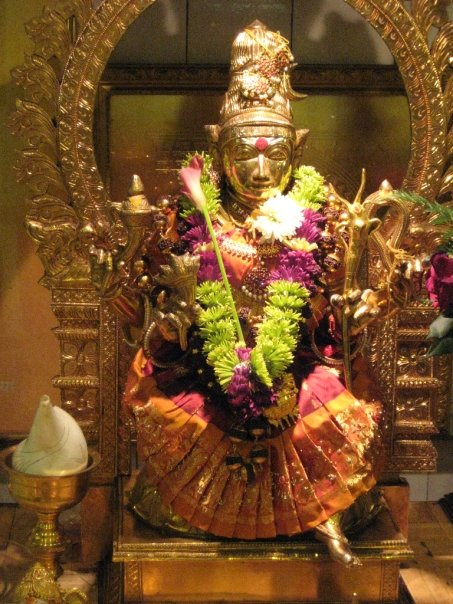
This is the Devi that goes out, during festivals

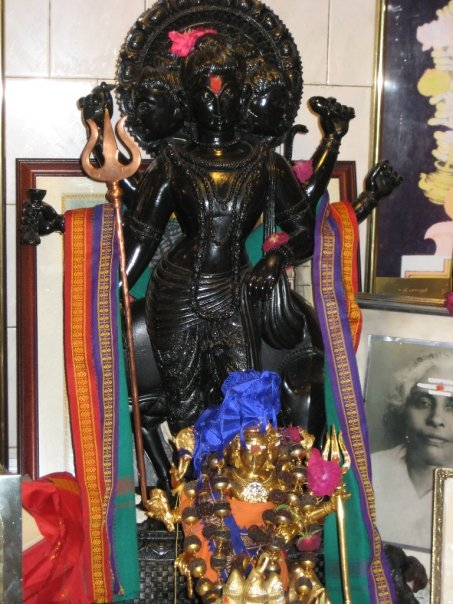
This is the Dattatreya at the temple

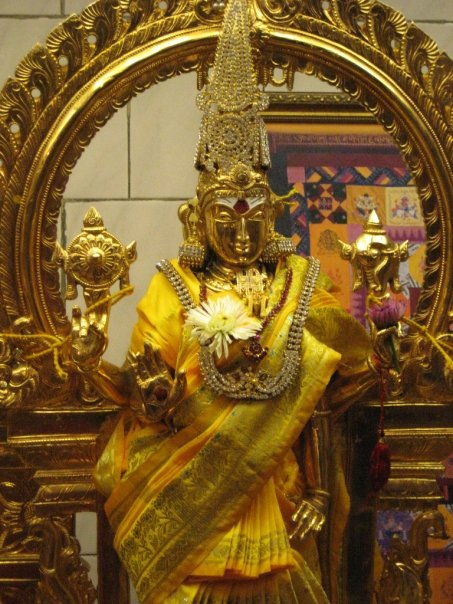
This is the Vishnu Durga at the temple

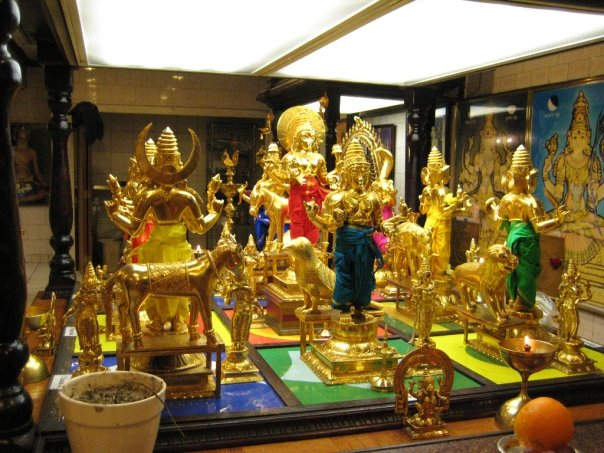
These are the Navagrahas at the temple

This is the Shanmuga at the temple

This is the Kamadenu at the temple, she is the Vahana of the devi

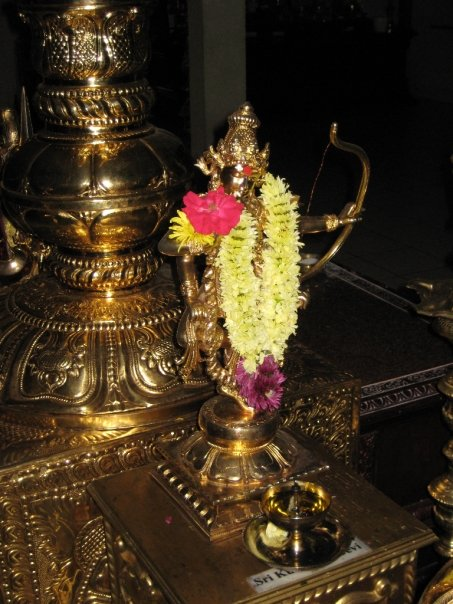
This is the Kurukulla Devi at the temple

This is the Shiva at Kasi, in the temple

This is the Devi being taken outside, during a festival

These are the saints in the temple

This is the Srichakra at the temple

== See also ==
- Devi
- Devipuram
- Hindu Gods
- Sri Chakra
