= Rigvedic dialogue hymns =

The Rigveda contains a number of dialogue hymns (saṃvāda-sūktas) in the form of dialogues, representing the earliest surviving sample of this genre. It can be argued to be an early precursor of Indian classical drama. They are found in the youngest part of the Rigveda (RV 1 and RV 10), dating to roughly the 12th to 10th centuries BC, with the exception of the older River hymn (RV 3.33), where the rivers answer in reply to Vishvamitra's prayer.

- 1.165 Indra, Maruts and Agastya
- 1.170 Indra and Agastya
- 1.179 Agastya and Lopamudra (5 trishtubhs, 1 brhati)
- 3.33 Vishvamitra and the Rivers (12 trishtubhs, 1 anushtubh)
- 10.10 Yama and Yami (12 anushtubhs)
- 10.51 Agni and the gods (9 trishtubhs)
- 10.86 Indrani, Indra, the "he-ape" Vrshakapi and his wife
- 10.95 Pururavas and Urvashi (18 trishtubhs)
- 10.108 Sarama and Panis
- 10.183 sacrificer and his wife (3 trishtubhs)

== See also ==
- Gambler's Lament (a Rigvedic "monologue" hymn)
