= Mandala 10 =

Tenth book of the Rigveda

The tenth mandala, or chapter, of the Rigveda contains 191 hymns. Together with Mandala 1, it forms the latest part of the Rigveda, containing material, including the Purusha Sukta (10.90) and the dialogue of Sarama with the Panis (10.108), and notably containing several dialogue hymns.

== Topics ==
The subjects of the hymns cover a wider spectrum than in the other books, dedicated not only to deities or natural phenomena, including deities that are not prominent enough to receive their own hymns in the other books (Nirrti 10.59, Asamati 10.60, Ratri 10.127, Aranyani 10.146, Indrani 10.159), but also to objects like dice (10.34), herbs (10.97), press-stones (for Soma, 10.94, 175) and abstract concepts like liberality (towards the rishi, 10.117), creation (10.129 (the Nasadiya Sukta), 130, 190), knowledge (10.71), speech, spirit (10.58), faith (10.151), a charm against evil dreams (10.164).

10.15, dedicated to the forefathers, contains a reference to the emerging rite of cremation in verse 14, where ancestors "both cremated (agnidagdhá-) and uncremated (ánagnidagdha-)" are invoked.

10.47 to 50 are to Indra Vaikuntha, "Indra son of Vikuntha". Vikuntha was an Asuri whom Indra had allowed to become his second mother. The rishi of 10.47 is called Saptagu, while that of 10.48–50 is likewise called Indra Vaikuntha.

10.85 is a marriage hymn, evoking the marriage of Suryā, daughter of Surya (the Sun), another form of Ushas, the prototypical bride.

RV 10.121 (the Hiranyagarbha Sukta) is another hymn dealing with creation, containing elements of monotheism. It has a recurring pada "what God shall we adore with our oblation?", in verse 1 named Hiranyagarbha "the golden egg" or Cosmic egg, later a name of Brahma, in verse 10 addressed as Prajapati.

10.129 (the Nasadiya Sukta) and 130 are creation hymns, probably the best known Rigvedic hymns in the west, especially 10.129.7:

He, the first origin of this creation, whether he formed it all or did not form it, / Whose eye controls this world in highest heaven, he verily knows it, or perhaps he knows not. (Griffith)

These hymns exhibit a level of philosophical speculation very atypical of the Rigveda, which for the most part is occupied with ritualistic invocation.

10.145 is attributed to Indrani. It is a spell for a jealous wife to get rid of more favoured rival. Atypical of the Rigveda, similar spells are found in the Atharvaveda.

10.154 is a funeral hymn, asking for that the departed may join those who attained heaven through tapas. Padas 1 cd is reminiscent of the Norse concept of Valhalla:

To those for whom the meath flows forth, even to those let him depart. (Griffith)

10.155 is against the "one-eyed limping hag" Arayi.

10.166, attributed to Anila, is a spell for the destruction of rivals, similar to 10.145, but this time to be uttered by men who want to be rid of male rivals.

10.173 and 174 are benedictions of a newly elected king.

The rishis of the 10th Mandala are divided into Shudrasuktas and Mahasuktas, that is, sages who have composed "small" vs. "great" hymns.

== Selected hymns ==
Sukta	Name	Deity	Rishi	Metre	Incipit
10 13		Havirdhanas			yujé vām bráhma pūrviyáṃ námobhir
10 75	Nadistuti Sukta	Rivers			prá sú va āpo mahimânam uttamáṃ
10 81	Vishwakarma Sukta	Vishvakarman	Vishwakarma		yá imâ víśvā bhúvanāni júhvad
10 83	Manyu Sukta	Manyu			yás te manyo ávidhad vajra sāyaka
10 90	Purusha Sukta	Purusha			sahásraśīrṣā púruṣaḥ
10 95		Urvashi and Pururavas			hayé jâye mánasā tíṣṭha ghore
10 107		Dakṣiṇā			āvír abhūn máhi mâghonam eṣāṃ
10 108		Sarama and the Panis			kím ichántī sarámā prédám ānaḍ
10 121	Hiranyagarbha Sukta	Hiranyagarbha/Prajapati			hiraṇyagarbháḥ sám avartatâgre
10 123		Vena			ayáṃ venáś codayat pŕśnigarbhā
10 129	Nasadiya Sukta	Creation			nâsad āsīn nó sád āsīt tadânīṃ
10 136		Keśin			keśî agníṃ keśî viṣáṃ
10 145		Sapatnibadhana	Indrani		imâṃ khanāmi óṣadhiṃ
10 178		Tarkshya			tiyám ū ṣú vājínaṃ devájūtaṃ
10 183		the sacrificer and his wife	Prajavan		ápaśyaṃ tvā mánasā cékitānaṃ

== See also ==
- Rigvedic dialogue hymns
- Gambler's Lament
