= Nasadiya Sukta =

One hymn of the Rigveda which concerned with cosmology and the origin of the universe

The Nāsadīya Sūkta (after the incipit ná ásat, or "not the non-existent"), also known as the Hymn of Creation, is the 129th hymn of the 10th mandala of the Rigveda (10:129). It is concerned with cosmology and the origin of the universe. The Nāsadīya Sūkta has been the subject of extensive scholarly attention.

There are numerous translations and interpretations of the text. Nasadiya Sukta begins with the statement: "Then, there was neither existence, nor non-existence." It ponders when, why, and through whom the universe came into being in a contemplative tone, and provides no definite answers. Rather, it concludes that the gods too may not know, as they came after creation, and that even the surveyor of that which has been created, in the highest heaven may or may not know. To this extent, the conventional English title Hymn of Creation is perhaps misleading, since the verse does not itself present a cosmogony or creation myth akin to those found in other religious texts, instead provoking the listener to question whether one can ever know all the details of origins of the universe.

Nasadiya Sukta (Hymn of Eternity, origin of universe):

There was neither non-existence nor existence then;
Neither the realm of space, nor the sky which is beyond;
What stirred? Where? In whose protection?

There was neither death nor immortality then;
No distinguishing sign of night nor of day;
That One breathed, windless, by its own impulse;
Other than that there was nothing beyond.

Darkness there was at first, by darkness hidden;
Without distinctive marks, this all was water;
That which, becoming, by the void was covered;
That One by force of heat came into being;

Who really knows? Who will here proclaim it?
Whence was it produced? Whence is this creation?
Gods came afterwards, with the creation of this universe.
Who then knows whence it has arisen?

Whether God's will created it, or whether He was mute;
Perhaps it formed itself, or perhaps it did not;
The Supreme Brahman of the world, all pervasive and all knowing
He indeed knows, if not, no one knows

— Rigveda 10.129 (Abridged, Tr: Kramer / Christian)

== Interpretations ==
The hymn has attracted a large body of literature of commentaries both in Indian darsanas and in Western philology. The hymn, as Mandala 10 in general, is late within the Rigveda Samhita, and expresses thought more typical of later Vedantic philosophy. Even though untypical of the content of the Vedic hymns, it is one of the most widely received portions of the Rigveda. An atheist interpretation sees the Creation Hymn as one of the earliest accounts of skeptical inquiry and agnosticism. Astronomer Carl Sagan quoted it in discussing India's "tradition of skeptical questioning and unselfconscious humility before the great cosmic mysteries."

The text begins by paradoxically stating, "not the non-existent existed, nor did the existent exist then" (ná ásat āsīt ná u sát āsīt tadânīm), which is paralleled in verse 2 by "then not death existed, nor the immortal" (ná mṛtyúḥ āsīt amŕtam ná tárhi). However verse 2 already mentions that there was "breathing without breath, of its own nature, that one" ânīt avātám svadháyā tát ékam). In verse 3, being unfolds, "from heat (tapas) was born that one" (tápasaḥ tát mahinâ ajāyata ékam). Verse 4 mentions desire (kāma) as the primal seed, and the first poet-seers (kavayas) who "found the bond of being within non-being with their heart's thought".

Karel Werner describes the author's source for the material as one not derived from reasoning, but a "visionary, mystical or Yogic experience put into words."

Brereton (1999) argues that the reference to the sages searching for being in their spirit is central, and that the hymn's gradual procession from non-being to being in fact re-enacts creation within the listener (see sphoṭa), equating poetic utterance and creation (see śabda).

== Metre ==
Nasadiya Sukta consists of seven trishtubhs, although para 7b is defective, being two syllables short,

yádi vā dadhé yádi vā ná
"if he has created it; or if not [...]"

Brereton (1999) argues that the defect is a conscious device employed by the rishi to express puzzlement at the possibility that the world may not be created, parallel to the syntactic defect of pada 7d, which ends in a subordinate clause without a governing clause:

só aṅgá veda yádi vā ná véda
"he verily knows; or maybe he does not know [...]"

== Text and translation ==
Devanagari

नास॑दासी॒न्नो सदा॑सीत्त॒दानीं॒ नासी॒द्रजो॒ नो व्यो॑मा प॒रो यत् ।
किमाव॑रीव॒: कुह॒ कस्य॒ शर्म॒न्नम्भ॒: किमा॑सी॒द्गह॑नं गभी॒रम् ॥१॥
न मृ॒त्युरा॑सीद॒मृतं॒ न तर्हि॒ न रात्र्या॒ अह्न॑ आसीत्प्रके॒तः ।
आनी॑दवा॒तं स्व॒धया॒ तदेकं॒ तस्मा॑द्धा॒न्यन्न प॒रः किं च॒नास॑ ॥२॥
तम॑ आसी॒त्तम॑सा गू॒ळ्हमग्रे॑ऽप्रके॒तं स॑लि॒लं सर्व॑मा इ॒दम् ।
तु॒च्छ्येना॒भ्वपि॑हितं॒ यदासी॒त्तप॑स॒स्तन्म॑हि॒नाजा॑य॒तैक॑म् ॥३॥
काम॒स्तदग्रे॒ सम॑वर्त॒ताधि॒ मन॑सो॒ रेत॑: प्रथ॒मं यदासी॑त् ।
स॒तो बन्धु॒मस॑ति॒ निर॑विन्दन्हृ॒दि प्र॒तीष्या॑ क॒वयो॑ मनी॒षा ॥४॥
ति॒र॒श्चीनो॒ वित॑तो र॒श्मिरे॑षाम॒धः स्वि॑दा॒सी३दु॒परि॑ स्विदासी३त् ।
रे॒तो॒धा आ॑सन्महि॒मान॑ आसन्त्स्व॒धा अ॒वस्ता॒त्प्रय॑तिः प॒रस्ता॑त् ॥५॥
को अ॒द्धा वे॑द॒ क इ॒ह प्र वो॑च॒त्कुत॒ आजा॑ता॒ कुत॑ इ॒यं विसृ॑ष्टिः ।
अ॒र्वाग्दे॒वा अ॒स्य वि॒सर्ज॑ने॒नाऽथा॒ को वे॑द॒ यत॑ आब॒भूव॑ ॥६॥
इ॒यं विसृ॑ष्टि॒र्यत॑ आब॒भूव॒ यदि॑ वा द॒धे यदि॑ वा॒ न ।
यो अ॒स्याध्य॑क्षः पर॒मे व्यो॑म॒न्त्सो अ॒ङ्ग वे॑द॒ यदि॑ वा॒ न वेद॑ ॥७॥

IAST

1. nā́sad āsīn nó sád āsīt tadā́nīṃ
nā́sīd rájo nó víomā paró yát
kím ā́varīvaḥ kúha kásya śármann
ámbhaḥ kím āsīd gáhanaṃ gabhīrám
2. ná mr̥tyúr āsīd amŕ̥taṃ ná tárhi
ná rā́triyā áhna āsīt praketáḥ
ā́nīd avātáṃ svadháyā tád ékaṃ
tásmād dhānyán ná paráḥ kíṃ canā́sa
3. táma āsīt támasā gūháḷam ágre
apraketáṃ saliláṃ sárvam ā idám
tuchyénābhú ápihitaṃ yád ā́sīt
tápasas tán mahinā́jāyataíkam
4. kā́mas tád ágre sám avartatā́dhi
mánaso rétaḥ prathamáṃ yád ā́sīt
sató bándhum ásati nír avindan
hr̥dí pratī́ṣyā kaváyo manīṣā́
5. tiraścī́no vítato raśmír eṣām
adháḥ svid āsī́d upári svid āsīt
retodhā́ āsan mahimā́na āsan
svadhā́ avástāt práyatiḥ parástāt
6. kó addhā́ veda ká ihá prá vocat
kúta ā́jātā kúta iyáṃ vísr̥ṣṭiḥ
arvā́g devā́ asyá visárjanena
áthā kó veda yáta ābabhū́va
7. iyáṃ vísr̥ṣṭir yáta ābabhū́va
yádi vā dadhé yádi vā ná
yó asyā́dhyakṣaḥ paramé vyoman
só aṅgá veda yádi vā ná véda.

English (Basham 1954)

1. Then even non-existence was not there, nor existence,
There was no air then, nor the space beyond it.
What covered it? Where was it? In whose keeping?
Was there then cosmic fluid, in depths unfathomed?
2. Then there was neither death nor immortality
nor was there then the torch of night and day.
The One breathed windlessly and self-sustaining.
There was that One then, and there was no other.
3. At first there was only darkness wrapped in darkness.
All this was only unillumined cosmic water.
That One which came to be, enclosed in nothing,
arose at last, born of the power of knowledge.
4. In the beginning desire descended on it -
that was the primal seed, born of the mind.
The sages who have searched their hearts with wisdom
know that which is, is kin to that which is not.
5. And they have stretched their cord across the void,
and know what was above, and what below.
Seminal powers made fertile mighty forces.
Below was strength, and over it was impulse.
6. But, after all, who knows, and who can say
Whence it all came, and how creation happened?
the gods themselves are later than creation,
so who knows truly whence it has arisen?
7. Whence all creation had its origin,
the creator, whether he fashioned it or whether he did not,
the creator, who surveys it all from highest heaven,
he knows — or maybe even he does not know.

== See also ==
- Creation myth
- Creatio ex nihilo
- God in Hinduism
- Hindu cosmology
- Hiranyagarbha
- Indian logic
- List of suktas and stutis
- Narayana sukta
- Neti neti
- Purusha Sukta

== Sources ==
- Lisman, J.W. (2013). Cosmogony, Theogony and Anthropogeny in Sumerian texts. Ugarit-Verlag.
