= Narayana sukta =

Hindu hymn of the Yajurveda

Narayana Sukta

"Whatever all this universe is,
seen or heard of—pervading all this,
from inside and outside alike,
stands supreme the Ultimate Reality (Narayana).

The Narayana Sukta or Narayana Suktam (Sanskrit: नारायणसूक्तम्, romanized: Nārāyaṇasūktam) is a Hindu hymn propitiating Narayana (Vishnu), featured in the 13th anuvaka (section) of the 10th prapathaka (chapter) of Taittiriya Aranyaka, which is part of the Krishna Yajurveda. In this hymn, Vishnu is extolled as the Ultimate Reality.

It is venerated as one among the five hymns from the Vedas called the Pancha Sukta by Vaishnavites, the other four usually being the Purusha Sukta, the Sri Sukta, the Bhu Sukta, and the Nila Sukta. Some commentators see it as a mystical appendix to the Purusha Sukta.

== Description ==
The first verse of Narayana sukta mentions the words "paramam padam", which literally means "highest position", commonly understood as the "supreme abode for all the souls". This status is not given to any other god other than Vishnu (the all-pervading) in the Vedas. In this hymn, Narayana is described to be the one with a thousand heads, the one who watches and illuminates all. The deity is stated to pervade all of existence, be indestructible and eternal, the heart of all things, and the one who does good to all. He is also stated to be the Absolute, and the supreme meditation. A simile of the hymn compares the heart to an inverted lotus bud, equidistant between the collarbone and the navel. At the centre of this heart, a great fire with flames that radiate all sides is said to burn. This fire is described to assimilate food and distribute this energy from the head to the foot of the body. Another simile compares the flame to a flash of lightning in a blue-black cloud and a sprout of barley husk, one that is as tiny as an atom and ever conscious. At the centre of this flame, the Supreme Being is described to reside, called Brahma, Shiva, Hari as well as Indra, that which is transcendent and existence itself.

== See also ==
- List of suktas and stutis
