= Hiraṇyagarbha Sūkta =

Hymn of the tenth mandala of the Rigveda

The Hiranyagarbha Suktam (Sanskrit: हिरण्यगर्भ सूक्तम्) is the 121st hymn of the tenth mandala of the Rigveda. In this sukta, Hiranyagarbha is mentioned as the God of the gods and there is no one like Him. The Hiranyagarbha Sukta declares that Brahman manifested Himself from the beginning as the Creator of the universe, including everything, including His own everything, the collective totality, as it were, to make it the chief intelligence of the whole creation.

Sage Hiranyagarbha is the author of Hiranyagarbha Sukta. The deity of the hymn is the Prajāpati. The Upanishad calls it the Soul of the Universe or Brahman. It is composed of ten riks of trishtup rhythm.
