= Purusha Sukta =

Rigvedic hymn dedicated to Purusha

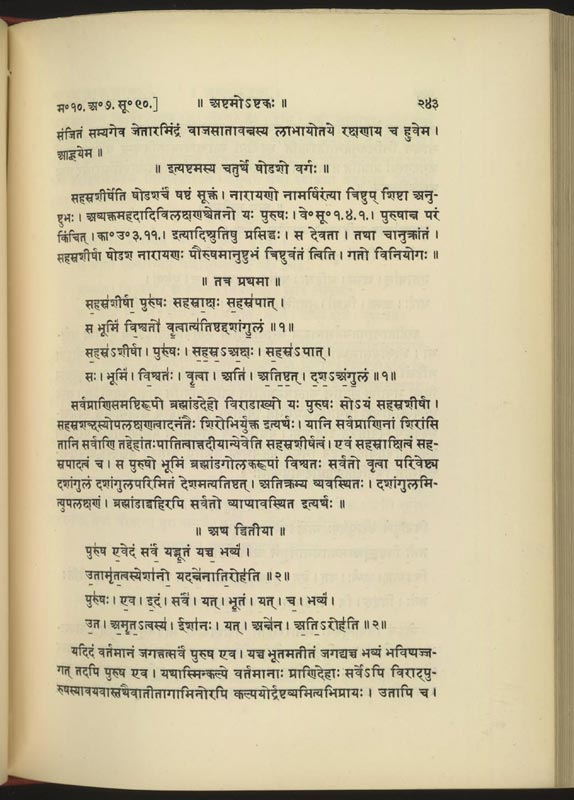
The first two verses of the Purusha sukta, with Sayanacharya's commentary. Page of Max Müller's Rig-Veda-samhita rendered into the devanagari script, the Sacred Hymns of the Brahmans (reprint, London 1974).

Purusha Sukta (पुरुषसूक्तम्, IAST: Puruṣasūktam) is a hymn in the Rigveda (X.90), dedicated to the Purusha, the "Cosmic Being". It is considered to have been a relatively late addition to the scripture — probably, to accord theological sanction to an increasingly unequal Kuru polity — and is the only hymn to mention the four varnas in explicit, alluding to a hierarchical division of the society. The hymn is also found in the three other Vedas but in slightly different forms.

== Contents ==
The Purusha Sukta gives a description of the spiritual unity of the universe. It presents the nature of Purusha, or the cosmic being, as both immanent in the manifested world and yet transcendent to it. From this being, the Sukta holds, the original creative will (identified with Vishvakarma, Hiranyagarbha or Prajapati) proceeds which causes the projection of the universe in space and time. The Purusha Sukta, in the seventh verse, hints at the organic connectedness of the various classes of society.

=== Purusha ===
The Purusha is defined in verses 2 to 5 of the Sukta. He is described as a being who pervades everything conscious and unconscious universally. He is poetically depicted as a being with thousand heads, eyes and legs, enveloping not just the earth, but the entire universe from all sides and transcending it by ten fingers length – or transcending in all 10 dimensions. All manifestations, in past, present and future, is held to be the Purusha alone. It is also proclaimed that he transcends his creation. The immanence of the Purusha in manifestation and yet his transcendence of it is similar to the viewpoint held by panentheists. Finally, his glory is held to be even greater than the portrayal in this Sukta.

=== Creation ===
Verses 5–15 hold the creation of the Rig Veda. Creation is described to have started with the origination of Virat, or the astral body from the Purusha. In Virat, omnipresent intelligence manifests itself which causes the appearance of diversity. In the verses following, it is held that Purusha through a sacrifice of himself, brings forth the avian, forest-dwelling, and domestic animals, the three Vedas, the meters (of the mantras). Then follows a verse that states that from his mouth, arms, thighs, and feet the four varnas (categories) are born.

After the verse, the Sukta states that the moon takes birth from the Purusha's mind and the sun from his eyes. Indra and Agni descend from his mouth and from his vital breath, air is born. The firmament comes from his navel, the heavens from his head, the earth from his feet and quarters of space from his ears. Through this creation, underlying unity of human, cosmic and divine realities is espoused, for all are seen arising out of same original reality, the Purusha.

=== Yajna ===
The Purusha Sukta holds that the world is created by and out of a Yajna or exchange of the Purusha. All forms of existence are held to be grounded in this primordial yajna. In the seventeenth verse, the concept of Yajna itself is held to have arisen out of this original sacrifice. In the final verses, yajna is extolled as the primordial energy ground for all existence.

== Context ==
The Sukta gives an expression to immanence of radical unity in diversity and is therefore, seen as the foundation of the Vaishnava thought, Bhedabheda school of philosophy and Bhagavata theology.

The Purusha Sukta is repeated with some variations in the Atharva Veda (19.6). Sections of it also occur in the Panchavimsha Brahmana, the Vajasaneyi Samhita and the Taittiriya Aranyaka. Among Puranic texts, the Sukta is elaborated in the Bhagavata Purana (verses 2.5.35 to 2.6.1–29) and in the Mahabharata (Mokshadharma Parva, Chapter 351 and 352).

Commentaries to Purusha Sukta have been written by Sayanacharya, Battabaskara, Rangaramanuja Muni, Maheedhara, and Uvatar.

== Authenticity ==
The verses about social estates in the Purusha Sukta are considered to belong to the latest layer of the Rigveda by scholars such as Vijaya Nagarajan, Stephanie W. Jamison and Joel P. Brereton. V. Nagarajan believes that it was an "interpolation" to give "divine sanction" to an unequal division in society that was in existence at the time of its composition. He states "The Vedic Hymns had been composed before the Varna scheme was implemented. The Vedic society was not organized on the basis of varnas. The Purusha Sukta might have been a later interpolation to secure Vedic sanction for that scheme". Jamison and Brereton, professors of Sanskrit and Religious studies, state, "there is no evidence in the Rigveda for an elaborate, much-subdivided and overarching caste system", and "the varna system seems to be embryonic in the Rigveda and, both then and later, a social ideal rather than a social reality". Suvira Jaiswal, an Indian historian, also states that the Purusha Sukta is an interpolation in the Rig Veda and that it's connected with the non-Vedic Narayana containing 16 verses. Ambedkar also regarded the Purusha sukta as an interpolation, referring to "Max Muller and others."

== See also ==
- Śrī Sūkta
- Historical Vedic religion
- List of suktas and stutis
- Nasadiya Sukta (Hymn of Creation)
- Agganna Sutta — a Buddhist critique
- Varna (Hinduism) and Caste system in India

== Sources ==
- Koller, John M. (2006), The Indian Way: An Introduction to the Philosophies & Religions of India (2nd ed.), Pearson Education, ISBN 0131455788
- Visvanathan, Meera (2011), "Cosmology and Critique: Charting a History of the Purusha Sukta", in Roy, Kumkum (ed.), Insights and Interventions: Essays in Honour of Uma Chakravarti, Delhi: Primus Books, pp. 143–168, ISBN 978-93-80607-22-1
- Rosen, Steven (2006), Essential Hinduism, Greenwood Publishing Group, ISBN 978-0275990060
