= Devipuram =

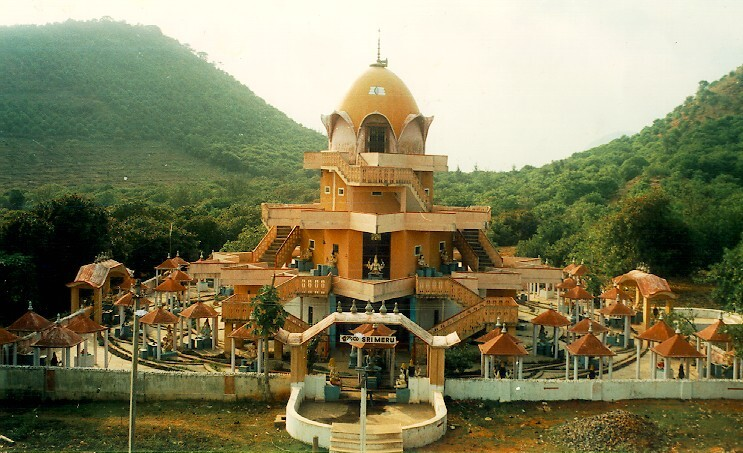
- Sahasrakshi Meru Temple

- Location Visakhapatnam

Religion
- Affiliation: Hinduism
- District: Anakapalli
- Deity: Shakti as Sahasrakshi

Location
- State: Andhra Pradesh
- Country: India
- Coordinates: 17°45′55.32″N 83°4′58.64″E

Architecture
- Type: South Indian Architecture
- Creator: N. Prahalada Sastry
- Completed: 1985-1994
- Temple: 4

Website
- devipuram.com

Devipuram is a Hindu temple complex located near Visakhapatnam, Andhra Pradesh, India. Belonging primarily to the Shakta school of Hinduism, it is dedicated to the goddess Sahasrakshi (lit., "she who has a infinite eyes", a form of Lalita Tripurasundari or Parvati), and her consort Kameshwara (a form of Shiva).

== Overview ==
Devipuram's primary focus is the Sahasrakshi Meru Temple, a unique three-story structure built in the shape of a Sri Meru Yantra; i.e., three-dimensional projection of the sacred Hindu diagram known as Sri Chakra, which is central to Srividya upasana (an ancient and intricate form of Tantric Shakta worship). Measuring 108 feet (33 m) square at its base and rising 54 feet (16 m) high, the temple has become an increasingly popular pilgrimage destination over the past decade. Two other shrines, the Kamakhya Peetham and Sivalayam, are located on hills adjacent to the main temple.

The sanctum sanctorum of the Sahasrakshi Meru Temple is reached by circumambulating inward and upward, past more than 100 life-sized murthis of various shaktis or yoginis (deities expressing essential aspects of the Devi) who are, in Srividya cosmology, said to inhabit and energize the Sri Chakra. Their exact locations are "mapped" in an elaborate ritual called the Navavarana Puja ("Worship of the Nine Enclosures"), which was in turn condensed into a mantric composition called the Sri Devi Khadgamala Stotram ("Hymn to the Auspicious Goddess's Garland of Swords"), forming the basis of the temple's layout.

This temple is unconventional in its practice of allowing devotees to perform puja to the Devi themselves, without regard to caste, creed or gender. This may be an emulation of the Kamakhya temple complex in Assam, which has the same open policy for worship. The fact that many of the temple's murthis are portrayed as "sky-clad," or nude, has also, over the years, gained Devipuram considerable attention.

== History ==
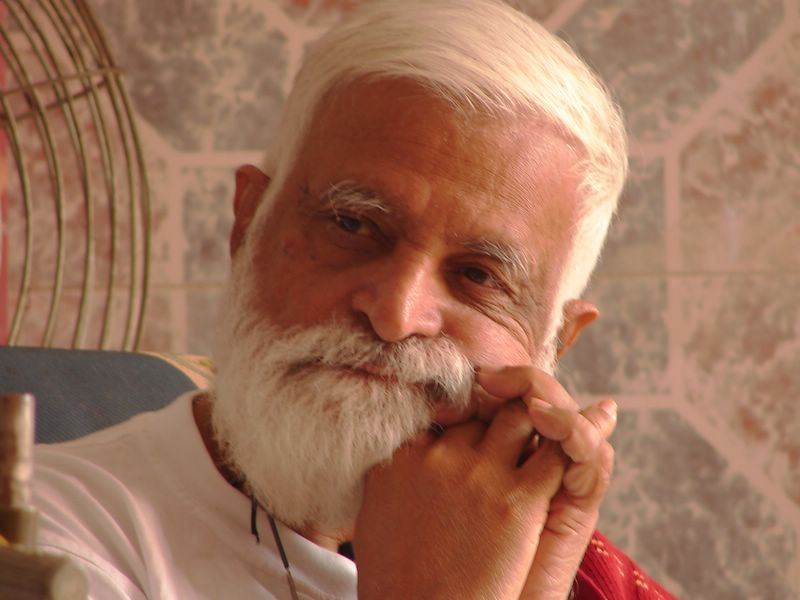
Dr. N. Prahalada Sastry (Sri Amritananda Natha Saraswati), founder of Devipuram, in 2007.

Construction of the Sahasrakshi Meru Temple in Devipuram began in 1985, and its completion and consecration (kumbha-abhishekam) took place in 1994. In accordance with Hindu tradition, the temple was re-consecrated for its twelfth anniversary in February 2007.

The founder of Devipuram is Dr. N. Prahalada Sastry (1934—2015), a former university professor and nuclear physicist who left a successful 23-year career with the Tata Institute of Fundamental Research in Mumbai to begin work on the Devipuram temple in 1983. Now a noted spiritual guru, better known as Sri Amritananda Natha Saraswati (and generally addressed as "Guruji"), Sastry reports that his creation of Devipuram was based on several visions of the Divine Mother, which specified both the design and mission of the temple complex. Each of the many murthis within the Sahasrakshi Meru Temple was individually sculpted to Sastry's specifications, physically manifesting his meditative visions of these deities.

According to Devipuram's official history: "In 1983, during Devi Yajna, Guruji was approached by the brothers of the Putrevu family with a request to build a temple for the Divine Mother. In addition to the 3 acres (12,000 m^{2}) of land that they had donated, Guruji bought the adjoining 10 acres (40,000 m^{2}) and it was registered as land for the Devi temple." The history continues:

"Having acquired the land, Guruji was looking for divine guidance, a sign of approval to commence construction of the temple. In the vicinity of the donated land, there was a small hillock where Guruji would often spend time in meditation. On the slopes of the hillock, he noticed a formation [i.e., a cleft rock forming a natural yoni] very similar to that of the Kamakhya Peetam in Assam. One day while in meditation he experienced himself lying on the peetam [holy site], while four others performed a homa, with flames emanating from his body. And during purnahuthi [the final round of ritual offerings], he felt a heavy object being placed on his heart. Awakening from his meditative state, Guruji was prompted to dig that site. Unearthed from that very spot, he found a Sri Chakra Maha Meru made of panchaloha. It was later discovered that a huge yajna had been performed in that area more than 250 years earlier."

Soon afterward, "Guruji had visions of the Devi as a 16-year-old girl. With her blessings, he built the Kamakhya Peetam on the hillock and a Siva temple on the peak in 1984. Construction of the Sahasrakshi Meru Temple in Devipuram was started in 1985." A recent Devipuram publication reflected, "Even a fleeting glance at what has been accomplished around what used to be a no-man's land is enough to astound anyone."

Subba Rao Kompella and Wijayaharan were among the first people to be initiated by Guruji. Guruji initiated Subba Rao in 1978 while he was still at TIFR in Bombay and gave deekshanama as Guru Karunamaya. Wijayaharan was initiated by Guruji in 1979 in Zambia and was given deekshanama as Sri Chaitanyananda Natha Saraswathi.

== Mission & Activities ==
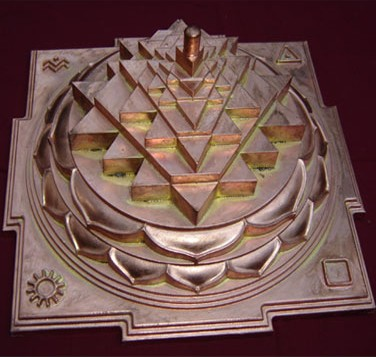
A Sri Meru Yantra produced by Devipuram, based on the original unearthed by Dr. N. Prahalada Sastry at the site of the Sahasrakshi Meru Temple.

In addition to providing regular religious services and other spiritual functions, Devipuram produces and distributes spiritual aids (most specifically related to Srividya upasana), such as high-precision Meru yantras, animated presentations, audio/video aids and other educational materials for spiritual aspirants.

Devipuram has also become a hub for spiritual and rural empowerment workshops and seminars. For this purpose, Sastry founded the Sri Vidya Trust, a not-for-profit, non-governmental organization headquartered at Devipuram. Through the trust, Sastry – along with other staff and volunteers at Devipuram – has undertaken a number of developmental initiatives focused on non-formal education, empowerment of women and low-cost housing for the rural poor. A cooperative thrift society, sponsored by the trust and called Jagruti, offers micro-financing services to local villagers. Low-cost, fire-retardant, geodesic dome-houses for pilgrims and other visitors have been erected at Devipuram, using appropriate technologies to demonstrate the viability of such designs in rural India. Devipuram has also conducted many rural empowerment programs in the surrounding countryside, relating to health, hygiene, family planning, literacy, energy generation and energy conservation.

== Future plans ==
In furtherance of Sastry's vision, Devipuram has ambitious plans to become a "global resource for goddess worship."

In 2005, news reports noted that a spiritual retreat would be developed at Devipuram. In 2010, as part of that development, the Sri Villa guest house was completed, featuring rooms of many sizes, a large cafeteria, an event hall accommodating 200 plus several smaller halls, and air-conditioned suites for families. In 2013, at age 78, Sastry announced that, upon his departure or passing, "Devi's padukas [symbolic of the goddess] will be in charge of Devipuram, not any human being. There will be no more peethadhipatis [human spiritual leaders] here; only administrators of the Sri Vidya Trust to look after all matters concerning Devipuram."
