= Khadgamala =

Mantra that names the Devi Hindu goddesses

The Khadgamala (Khaḍgamālā, Sanskrit: खड्गमाला, "Garland of the Sword") is an invocational mantra that names each of the Devi Hindu goddesses according to their place in the Sri Yantra or in the Maha Meru. This list of divine names is described poetically as a "garland" (Sanskrit: mālā). The sword (Sanskrit: khaḍga) is an epithet for the Devi's "power to strike down desire, hatred, and delusion".

== See also ==
- Kundalini energy
- List of suktas and stutis
- Litany
- Shakti
- Shaktism
- Stotra
