= Gambler's Lament =

Hymn of the Hindu Rigveda

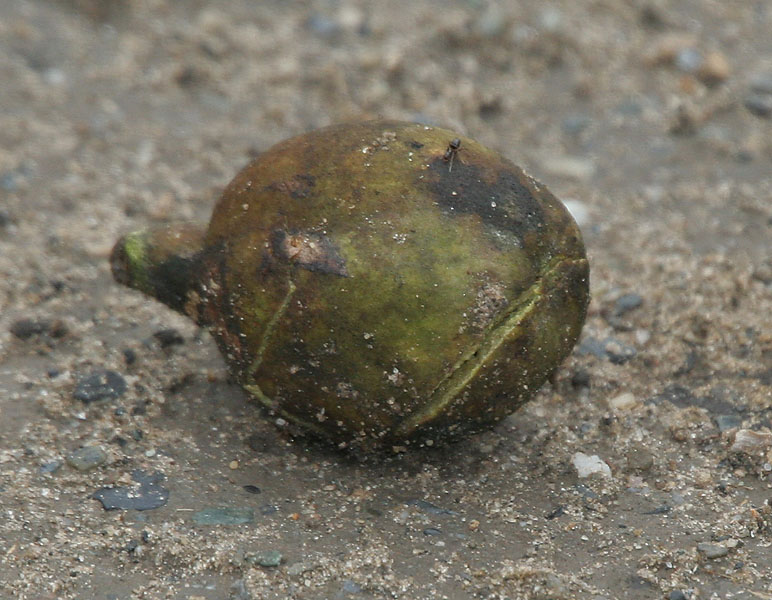
Fallen fruit of Terminalia bellirica (Vibhīdaka), which was used to make dice in ancient India

The Aksha Sukta (अक्षसूक्तम्, IAST: Akṣasūktam, Gambler's lament or "Gamester's lament") is one of the hymns of the Rigveda which do not have any direct cultic or religious context. It is found in the late Tenth Book (RV 10.34), where most of such hymns on "miscellaneous" topics are found, suggesting a date of compilation corresponding to the early Indian Iron Age. The hymn was composed by either Kanvasha Ailusha or Aksha Maujavant.

Moriz Winternitz considered the poem to be the "most beautiful among the non–religious poems of the Rig Veda." Arthur Anthony Macdonell writes the following about the poem: "Considering that it is the oldest composition of the kind in existence, we cannot but regard this poem as the most remarkable literary product."

The poem consists of a monologue of a repentant gambler who laments the ruin brought on him because of addiction to dice. The poem is didactic in nature and shows early indications of the proverbial and sententious poetry in later Hindu texts. Arthur Llewellyn Basham believed that Gambler's lament was originally constructed as a spell to ensure victory in a game of dice, which was later converted into a cautionary poem by an anonymous poet.

The poem testifies to the popularity of gambling among all classes of Vedic people, however it was most important among the kings and ruling class. In the middle Vedic Rajasuya ritual (consecration of a king), a ritual dice game is played in which the game is rigged so that the king-to-be wins. In the later Hindu epic, the Mahabharata, Yudhiṣṭhira gambles away his kingdom, brothers, wife, and himself to his cousins. The Mahabharata also mentions the story of Nala and Damayanti, in which Nala gambles away his kingdom. The dharmic texts, which also date to a later period, consider gambling to be a typical trait and vice of kings.

The gambling dice (akșa) were made from nuts of Terminalia bellirica (Vibhīdaka), into an oblong shape with four scoring sides— kŗta (four), tretā (trey), dvāpar (deuce), kali (ace). The gambler who drew a multiple of four won the game.

== Contents ==
The hymn consists of 14 verses in the tristubh meter. In verses 2–3, the narrator describes how the dice have ruined his domestic life (trans. Stephanie W. Jamison and Joel P. Brereton, 2014:

2. She did not oppose me, nor did she get angry; she was gracious to my comrades and to me.; I, on account of one die too many, have pushed away my avowed wife.	na mā mimetha na jihīḷa eṣā śivā sakhibhya uta mahyamāsīt akṣasyāhamekaparasya hetoranuvratāmapa jāyāmarodham	न मा मिमेथ न जिहीळ एषा शिवा सखिभ्य उत मह्यमासीत | अक्षस्याहमेकपरस्य हेतोरनुव्रतामप जायामरोधम ||
3. My mother-in-law [=her mother] hates me; my wife pushes me away. A man in distress finds no one to pity him.; "I find no more use for a gambler than for an old nag up for sale," (so they say).	dveṣṭi śvaśrūrapa jāyā ruṇaddhi na nāthito vindatemarḍitāram aśvasyeva jarato vasnyasya nāhaṃ vindāmikitavasya bhogham	दवेष्टि शवश्रूरप जाया रुणद्धि न नाथितो विन्दतेमर्डितारम | अश्वस्येव जरतो वस्न्यस्य नाहं विन्दामिकितवस्य भोगम ||

The poem then describes the lure of the dice:

5. When I resolve, "I will not play with them," I am bereft of my comrades, who go off (without me).; And as soon as, scattered down, the brown (dice) have raised their voice, I just go to their appointed place, like a girl with a lover.	yadādīdhye na daviṣāṇyebhiḥ parāyadbhyo.ava hīyesakhibhyaḥ nyuptāśca babhravo vācamakratanemīdeṣāṃ niṣkṛtaṃ jāriṇīva	यदादीध्ये न दविषाण्येभिः परायद्भ्यो.अव हीयेसखिभ्यः | नयुप्ताश्च बभ्रवो वाचमक्रतनेमीदेषां निष्क्र्तं जारिणीव ||

The dice are referred to as "the brown ones", as they were made from the brown nuts of Terminalia bellirica.

In the following verses the dice are described as "deceptive, hot and burning" and being similar to children in that "they give and take again". In verse 13, the poet addresses the gambler in an attempt to reform him, invoking the god Savitr.

13 [Savitar:] "Don't keep playing with dice; just plow your own plowland.Be content in your possessions, thinking them much. There are your cows, o gambler, there your wife." In this way does Savitar here, protector of the stranger, watch out for me.	akṣairmā dīvyaḥ kṛṣimit kṛṣasva vitte ramasva bahumanyamānaḥ tatra ghāvaḥ kitava tatra jāyā tan me vicaṣṭe savitāyamaryaḥ	अक्षैर्मा दीव्यः कर्षिमित कर्षस्व वित्ते रमस्व बहुमन्यमानः | तत्र गावः कितव तत्र जाया तन मे विचष्टे सवितायमर्यः ||

== See also ==
- Rigvedic dialogue hymns
- Gambler's conceit
- Problem gambling
