= Aggañña Sutta =

27th Sutta in the Digha Nikaya, Pāli Canon

Aggañña Sutta is the 27th sutta of the Dīgha Nikāya collection (Pāli version). The sutta describes a discourse imparted by the Buddha to two brahmins, Bhāradvāja and Vāseṭṭha, who left their family and varna to become monks. The two brahmans are insulted and maligned by their own caste for their intention to become members of the Sangha. The Buddha explains that varna (class) and lineage cannot be compared to the achievement of morality practice and the Dhamma, as anyone from the four varnas can become a monk and reach the state of Arahant. Then, he explains about the beginning and destruction of the world, a process determined by karma and devoid of a supreme being. The Buddha then explains the birth of social order and its structure, including the varnas. He emphasizes the message of universality in the Dhamma and how the Dhamma is the best of all things.

== The Beginning ==
The Sutta begins when the Buddha is staying in Savatthi, in the temple donated by Visākhā, the mother of Migāra. At that time, two brahmins, Bhāradvāja and Vāseṭṭha, are training with the monks (bhikkhu) and aim to be a member of the Sangha. As usual in the evening, the Buddha rises from his meditation and strolls in the open yard near his dwelling. Vāseṭṭha sees his Teacher strolling, tells his friend, Bhāradvāja, and suggests that they meet the Buddha to see if they can hear a Dhamma exposition from the Buddha.

They both approach the Buddha and after some formal proprieties, the Buddha asks the two if they received insults and denigration when they left their caste and layman's life in order to join the order. Vāseṭṭhaand Bhāradvāja answer that they did receive a 'flood of insults'. They say that the other Brahmins maintain that the Brahmin caste is the best, as the Brahmins are of high social status and authority, pure-bred, have radiant complexions, and are born from the mouth of their god Brahma, unlike the other lower castes. So, by the opinion of the other Brahmins, how can Vāseṭṭha and Bhāradvāja leave this good class and status, thus joining with fraudulent ascetics with shaven heads from other classes, lower in status as they are born from the feet of Brahma?

To this remark, the Buddha tells them that the Brahmins have indeed forgotten about their past if they said such things. The fact is that the women in the Brahmin class can get pregnant, give birth, and take care of their children. But the Brahmins still say that they are born from the mouth of the god Brahma and other (classes) are born from Brahma's feet. Thus, the Brahmins words are untrue. The Buddha said that the Brahmins are not speaking truthfully and they will reap a bad result from their own deeds.

The Buddha then elaborates that if any of the class does the following deeds: killing, taking anything that is not given, take part in sexual misconduct, lying, slandering, speaking rough words or nonsense, greedy, cruel, and practise wrong beliefs (miccha ditthi); people would still see that they do negative deeds and therefore are not worthy of respect. They will even get into trouble from their own deeds, whatever their class (Khattiya, Brahmin, Vessa, Sudda) might be.

While those who refrain from killing, taking anything that is not given, engage in sexual misconduct, lying, slandering, speaking rough words or nonsense, being greedy, cruel, and practising wrong beliefs (miccha ditthi), will be seen by people as positive and will earn respect from the people and the wise ones. They would be profiting from their deeds, no matter what their caste might be.

Logically, as the four classes can do either negative (demerit) or positive (merit) deeds, so will the wise reject the statement that only the Brahmins are the best class. Why? Because anyone from the four class, if they left the worldly affairs and became a monk, and due to their discipline and struggle, they become Arahant, people who conquered their mind's stains, have done whatever what must be done, have been relieved from the burden, have broken the bondage of birth, achieved freedom, freed due to achieved knowledge, then he is the best among others based on Truth (Dhamma).

The Buddha says, "Dhamma is the best thing for people in this life and the next as well."

Further, the Buddha proves that Dhamma is indeed the best thing of all things in life. He takes the example of King Pasenadi of the Kosala Kingdom, who has now conquered the Sakyans. The Sakyans revere, praise, and serve him with respect.

But, towards the Buddha, who came from the Sakyan people, King Pasenadi reveres, praises, and serves the Buddha with utmost respect. Even the monarch thinks like this: "The Samaṇa Gotama had perfect birth, while I am not perfect. The Samaṇa Gotama is mighty, while I am weak. The Samaṇa Gotama inspired awe and respect, while I do not. The Samaṇa Gotama is vastly influential and charming, while I only possess small influence." As even the King respects Dhamma, reveres Dhamma, and obeys Dhamma, therefore he bows and praises the Tathagatha.

The Buddha then advises Vāseṭṭha that whoever has strong, deep-rooted, and established belief in the Tathagatha, he can declare that he is the child of Bhagavan, born from the mouth of Dhamma, created from Dhamma, and the heir of Dhamma. Therefore, the titles of the Tathagatha are the Body of Dhamma, the Body of Brahma, the Manifestation of Dhamma, and the Manifestation of Brahma.

== The Beginning of Life in This World ==
In the second part of the Sutta, the Buddha tells the story of how human beings came to dwell in this world system.

The Buddha said that sooner or later, after a very long time, there would come a time when the world shrinks. At a time of contraction, beings are mostly born in the Abhassara Brahma world. And there they dwell, mind-made, feeding on delight, self-luminous, moving through the air, glorious — and they stay like that for a very long time. But sooner or later, after a very long period, this world begins to expand again. At a time of expansion, the beings from the Abhassara Brahma world, having died from there, are mostly reborn in this world. Here they dwell, mind-made, feeding on delight, self-luminous, moving through the air, glorious — and they stay like that for a very long time.

They floated above and around the earth. At this time, there were not yet seen the Moon and the Sun, there were not yet night and day, there were not yet names and identity or female or male. The creatures were only known as creatures.

At that period, Vāseṭṭha, there was just one mass of water, and all was darkness, blinding darkness.... And sooner or later, after a very long period of time, savory earth spread itself over the waters where those beings were. It looked just like the skin that forms itself over hot milk as it cools. It was endowed with color, smell, and taste. It was the color of fine ghee or heated butter and it was very sweet, like pure wild honey (1)

Some of the creatures of light (the Abbhasaras) who had curiosity and a greedy nature began to dive and taste the savory Earth's substance. At that moment, the creature found out that it tasted so delicious. Thus, greed started to seep in and it ate the substance voraciously, greedily, also calling its comrades (who were flying above and on earth) to join in the feast. Not long afterwards, the creatures began to eat greedily, and due to the huge amount of the mud substance they could feed on it for a very long time.

As they ate and ate, their luminous body began to be coated by the mud substance, formed a coarser body, then suddenly, the sun and moon were seen, so were the stars, and also Night and Day began on Earth. The logical explanation of this was that the creatures were the self-illuminating, so blinding and luminous that they didn't notice the Sun. The Earth was covered in their light. So, when the materialization took place, the light faded inside their newly conceived 'body' of mud and thus the night and day became apparent to them. Then, as the night and day became apparent, seasons and years also appeared.

Their body was still coarse and roughly shaped. Thus, after a very long time, the mud-like substance began to be exhausted. Then, mushroom-like plants began to grow so fast that they replaced the mud-like ocean. The creatures began to devour them as well, and they also found it delicious, like sweet honey and milk. Their body hardened more and details began to turn finer.

After another very long time, the mushrooms also began to be exhausted, replaced by cassava or turnip-like plants. They also began to devour them night and day, and thus they began to notice differences amongst them. As the changes of their bodies varied between each other, the concept of difference arose. The concepts of the beautiful and the ugly were born. The beautiful scorns the ugly and they became arrogant because of their appearance.

Then, after the turnips, the earth was grown with rice plants. The first rice plants were without husk and kernels. The sweet and honey-like rice flourished seeds abundantly. The people consumed them for a very long time. But there are people who became greedy and lazy. They took more rice than they needed for one day's meals. They began to take two, four, eight, and sixteen days' of rice reserves as they were too lazy to take rice every day. Owing to this, many other creatures began to store and hoard the rice. The generation time for rice plants became slower and slower. Usually, it took only one night for the plant to grow and be ready to be consumed, but by the karmic power the plant began to grow more and more slowly. Also the rice grew in kernels and husks, scattered, which the creatures must work, nurse, maintain, harvest, and cook in order to obtain the white rice.

By this time, the body of the creatures had become finely evolved. There was already the distinction between male and female. The man became preoccupied with women and vice versa. Then, as they were deeply attracted to each another, passion and desire was aroused, and they engaged in sexual relationships. The people who saw a couple engaged in sexual activity scolded them, and usually the couple were forbidden from entering the village for a certain period of time. Owing to this, the indulgent couples built closed dwellings where they indulged in sexual activity.

== The Birth of Social Order ==
In the third part, the Buddha explained about the origin of vannas (classes), their titles, and their order in the society system which were still rigidly effective in Buddha's time.

=== The Khattiya Class (Rulers) ===
The rice plants, as mentioned earlier, began to grow in separate plots and people began to divide lands and tend each other's cluster of rice fief. They became preoccupied in tending their own field. Then, as the evil and greed were aroused, there were people who begin stealing others' crops. At first, the others only warned the culprit and the culprit promised that he would never repeat it again. But when it was repeated several times, the people began punishing him with fist, stones, and then sticks. That is the origin of punishment forms. Then, people began to think that they were too busy to heed every crime and abuse that happened in their society. They grieved on the rising of evil amongst their people. But most of their time had already been invested in tending their fief. So, they appointed someone to rectify what is right and what is wrong, give warnings to those who need it, give punishment to those who deserve it, and in return, they will give him a share of their rice. So, they went to the fairest, ablest, most likeable, and most intelligent person and appointed him to do the judging and passing out sentences on the reward of a share of rice. The appointed person thus agreed and the people bestowed upon him the title : 'Maha Sammata' meaning: The People's Choice. Then, they bestowed also the second title: 'Khattiya' meaning the 'Lord of the Rice Field', and finally the third title: 'Raja' which means 'Who gladdens people with Dhamma (or Truth)'. This order was created by the people's wish and need, based on the Dhamma and not from others. The Buddha stated again that Dhamma is indeed the best of all things.

=== The Brahman Class ===
Then, amongst the people, some of them begin to think like this: "Evil deeds have risen amongst us, such as: theft, lies, murders, sexual abuses, punishment, and banishment. Now let us set aside evil, unuseful, and impolite things." The word Brahmans came, as it meant: "They who put aside Evil and unwholesome things" (1). They set up retreats and huts in the forests and meditated there. They came to the city at morning and evening only to gather food and after finishing gathering food, they returned to their huts and meditations. People noticed this and 'Those who meditated' were called 'Jhayanti' or 'Jhayaka'.

There are other people, who can't meditate or dwell in huts in the forest. So, they settled in the cities, did not meditate, but compiled books. The people called them 'Ajjhayaka' which meant 'They who don't meditate'. At first the Ajjhayaka were viewed lower than Jhayaka but in the Buddha's time, the Ajjhayaka had been viewed higher in status than the Jhayakas.

=== The Vessa (Traders) and the Sudda (Hunters) ===
Among the people who had settled and had family, some began to adopt various trades.

The remainder of these people preferred the work of hunting. The Shudra caste came from the word 'Shudra' which means: 'They Are Base Who Live By The Chase' [1].

All of the vannas from Khattiya, Brahman Vessa, and Sudda originated from these people, and not from others; in accordance to the Dhamma and not by others.

=== The Ascetics ===
But from the four vannas, there were people who were not satisfied with their living, left their home and became celibate ascetics. These are the origin of the fifth class formed from all the four class' people who left their lay life and became an ascetic.

== Buddha's Conclusion ==
The Buddha then concluded his discourse to Vāseṭṭha and Bhāradvāja: (Due to the governance of Dhamma which became the root of all class and people) anyone, from any the class, who did demerit and wrongdoings, lived a bad life of speech, thoughts, views, and wrongdoings, they would end up after their death, in the realm of sufferings, hell, loss, and torture.

But anyone, from any class, who did merit and good deeds, lived a good life of speech, thoughts, and deeds; had the right view, after their death, they would end in the realm of happiness and heaven.

Anyone, from any class, who did both merit and demerit, lived a good and bad life of speech, thoughts, and deeds; had either a right or a bad view, after their death, they could end in the realm of suffering or the realm of joy.

Anyone, from any class, who lived a life of disciplined deeds, speeches, thoughts, who had trained and developed himself in the seven factors of Enlightenment, then he would attain the eradication from the (stains/dust/dirt/filth) of mind in this current life.

Anyone, from four classes, who became a bhikku (Monk), arahant, who had eradicated stains of Mind, had done what must be done, had relieved himself from burden, who had attained freedom, who had broken the bondage of birth, who had been freed due to knowledge; then they would be declared as the best from all of them, in accordance to the Truth (Dharma) and not from the basis of not Truth (adhamma).

The Buddha quoted, "Dharma is the best thing for people In this life and the next as well."

The Buddha quoted the verses of Brahma Sandakumara: "The Khattiya is the best among those who maintain their lineage; He with knowledge and conduct is best of gods and men." then, the Buddha asserted that the verse is indeed true, according to the Dhamma, profitable, and true.

The Khattiya's best among those who value clan; He with knowledge and conduct is best of gods and men."

Thus the discourse ended with Vāseṭṭha and Bhāradvāja rejoicing in hearing the words of Buddha.

== Digging Deeper Into the Sutta ==
While the story of the world's beginning is considered a myth, on the other hand, the Buddhist doctrine requires a constant sceptical approach, where one must see and prove it before one believes it (ehipassiko). However, the profound insight of the Buddha in two major fields: science (cosmology) and social structure's origin indeed was revolutionary in his era.

On the science part, Buddha implied the theory of the Evolution of the Universe, where it is said to shrink and then expand in repeated cycles.

While on the social science part, the Buddha's words implied the equality of origin in the human race, whether by their sex, appearance, or by other categories which were founded later based on physiological differences. Buddha also emphasized that the social structure is formed voluntarily, based on righteousness and necessity, not based on Divine command as some theories stated.

The Monarchy is also formed voluntarily, and the people elect the most righteous and capable person, which implied the Democracy concept. The Monarch accepts a 'share of rice' as his reward to rectify the social order, which is the origin of voluntary reward which evolves into the taxation concept. However, the Buddha states that the Monarch is regarded worthy not because of his divine right but due to his righteousness in deeds.

The Buddha's message was clear, however, that the best thing in the world is Truth (Dhamma) and everything is created, measured, and valued based on Truth and not from something other.

According to Richard Gombrich, the sutta gives strong evidence that it was conceived entirely as a satire of Hindu claims regarding the divine nature of the varnashrama, showing that it is nothing but a human convention. According to Gombrich, the Buddha satirizes the Vedic "Hymn of the Cosmic Man" and etymologizes "reciter of the Veda" so as to make it mean "non-meditator" instead. Not all scholars agree with Gombrich's interpretation and his view is not unanimous.

Among those who disagree is Suwanda H J Sugunasiri, a Canadian Buddhist scholar, who most recently has presented a novel interpretation of the Sutta. Rejecting the view that the Sutta is a 'satire' (Gombrich) or 'good humoured irony' (Collins), he shows how "the Discourse is a historically and scientifically accurate characterization of the cyclical cosmic process" [2]. He compares the stages of cosmic, vegetation, human and linguistic evolution as indicated by the Buddha with those in western theory, beginning with 13.5 billion years ago of the Big Bang and ending with 150,000 years when 'anatomically modern humans' appear. The Big Bang, in this interpretation, marks not the beginning of the Evolutionary phase but the ending of the earlier Devolutionary phase, when there appears seven suns (as in a different Sutta), symbolic of intense heat. A critical point in Sugunasiri's reconstruction of the Buddha's universe is the novel take on the Abhassaras - as photons, translating the term Abhassara literally as 'hither-come-shining arrow' (ā + bhas + sara). In an expanded study, Sugunasiri points to two other Suttas (Brahmajala and Patika) in which the Buddha presents dimensions of the cosmic process. He also shows how the Buddha cuts through the Vedic myth of creation referred to in Gombrich.
