= Khilani =

The Khilani (Sanskrit: खिलानि, Khilāni) are a collection of 98 "apocryphal" hymns of the Rigveda, recorded in the Bāṣkala, but not in the Śākala shakha. They are late additions to the text of the Rigveda, but still belong to the "Mantra" period of Vedic Sanskrit, contemporary with the Atharvaveda, Yajurveda, and Samaveda, estimated to fall within the range of c. 1200–1000 BCE. The Khilāni hymns include the Śrī Sūkta, as well as the Kuntāpa hymns for the Mahāvrata ceremony, the New Year's festival of the early Kuru kingdom.

== Literature ==
- Isidor Scheftelowitz, Die Apokryphen des Rgveda, Breslau, 1906
- Usha R. Bhise, The Khila Suktas of the Rgveda: A Study, Bhandarkar Oriental Research Institute, Poona, 1995
