= Hiranyagarbha =

Golden womb or egg in Hindu cosmogony

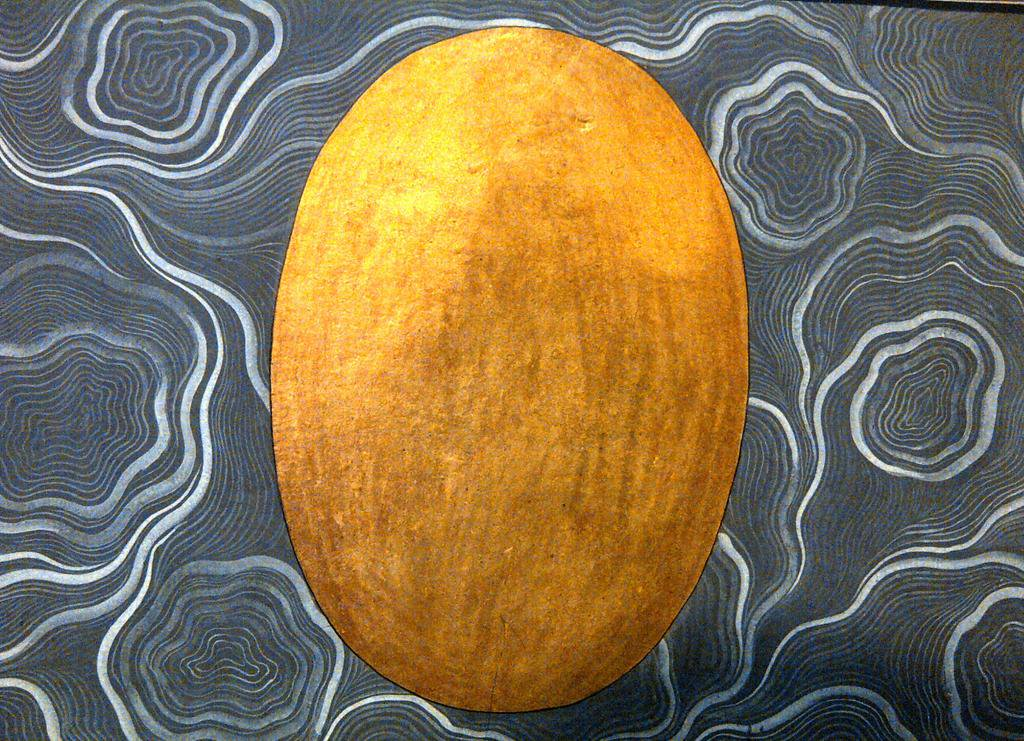
Pahari painting of golden cosmic egg Hiranyagarbha by Manaku, c. 1740

Hiranyagarbha (Sanskrit: हिरण्यगर्भ, lit. 'golden womb', IAST: Hiraṇyagarbha, poetically translated as 'universal womb') is the source of the creation of the universe or the manifested cosmos in Vedic philosophy. It finds mention in one hymn of the Rigveda (RV 10.121), known as the Hiraṇyagarbha Sūkta, suggesting a single creator deity (verse 8: yo deveṣv ādhi devā eka āsīt, Griffith: "He is the God of gods, and none beside him."), identified in the hymn as Prajāpati. The concept of the "golden womb" is first mentioned in the Vishvakarma Sūkta (RV 10.82.5,6) which picturized the "primeval womb" as being rested set upon the navel of Vishvakarma.

The Upanishad calls it the Soul of the Universe or Brahman, and elaborates that Hiraṇyagarbha floated around in emptiness and the darkness of the non-existence for about a year, and then broke into two halves which formed the Svarga and the Pṛthvi.

In classical Purāṇic Hinduism, Hiraṇyagarbha is the term used in the Vedanta for the "creator". Hiraṇyagarbha is also Brahmā, so called because it is said he was born in a golden egg (Manu Smṛti 1.9), while the Mahābhārata calls it the Manifest.

Some classical yoga traditions consider a person named Hiraṇyagarbha as the originator of yoga, though this may also be a name for Sage Kapila.

== Creation ==
The Matsya Purāṇa (2.25–30) gives an account of initial creation. After Mahāprālaya, the great dissolution of the Universe, there was darkness everywhere. Everything was in a state of sleep. There was nothing, either moving or static. Then Svayambhu, self-manifested being arose, which is a form beyond senses. It created the primordial waters first and established the seed of creation into it. The seed turned into a golden womb, Hiraṇyagarbha. Then Svayambhu entered into that egg.

The Nārāyaṇa Sūkta exclaims that everything that is, visible or invisible, all this is pervaded by Nārāyaṇa within and without.

The Īśvara Upaniṣad says that the universe is pervaded by Īśvara (God), who is both within and without it. He is the moving and the unmoving, He is far and near, He is within all these and without all these.

The Vedānta Sūtra further states that Brahman is That from Whom this Universe proceeds, in Whom it subsists, and to Whom, in the end, it returns.

The Saṃkhya school holds that there are only two primary principles, Puruṣa and Prākṛti, and creation is only a manifestation or evolution of the constituents of Prākṛti due to the action of Puruṣa's Consciousness.

The Bhagavata states that Nārāyaṇa alone was in the beginning, who was the pious of principles of creation, sustenance, and dissolution (also known as the Hindu Trinity of Brahmā, Viṣṇu and Shiva) - the Supreme god, multi-headed, multi-eyed, multi-footed, multi-armed, multi-limbed. This was the Supreme Seed of all creation, subtler than the subtlest, greater than the greatest, larger than the largest, and more magnificent than even the best of all things, more powerful, than even the wind and all the gods, more resplendent than the Sun and the Moon, and more internal than even the mind and the intellect. He is the Creator, the Supreme. The term can also mean as He who, having become first the Creator, has come to be considered as the womb of all objects.

The Hiraṇyagarbha Sūkta of the Rigveda declares that God manifested Himself in the beginning as the Creator of the Universe, encompassing all things, including everything within Himself, the collective totality, as it were, of the whole of creation, animating it as the Supreme Intelligence. In the Rigveda (RV 10.121) it is also mentioned that at the creation of the world the cosmic egg was separated in to two halves, one part became the sky and the other the sun.

== See also ==
- Amrita – Nectar of immortality in Hinduism and used as a metaphor in Buddhism
- Cosmic egg – Common motif in mythology and cosmogony
- Elixir of life – Alchemical potion that grants immunity, eternal youth and immortality to its drinker
- Ammavaru – Hindu goddess who laid the egg from which Brahma, Vishnu, and Shiva hatched according to South Indian tradition
