= Śrī Sūkta =

Rigvedic hymns dedicated to Lakshmi

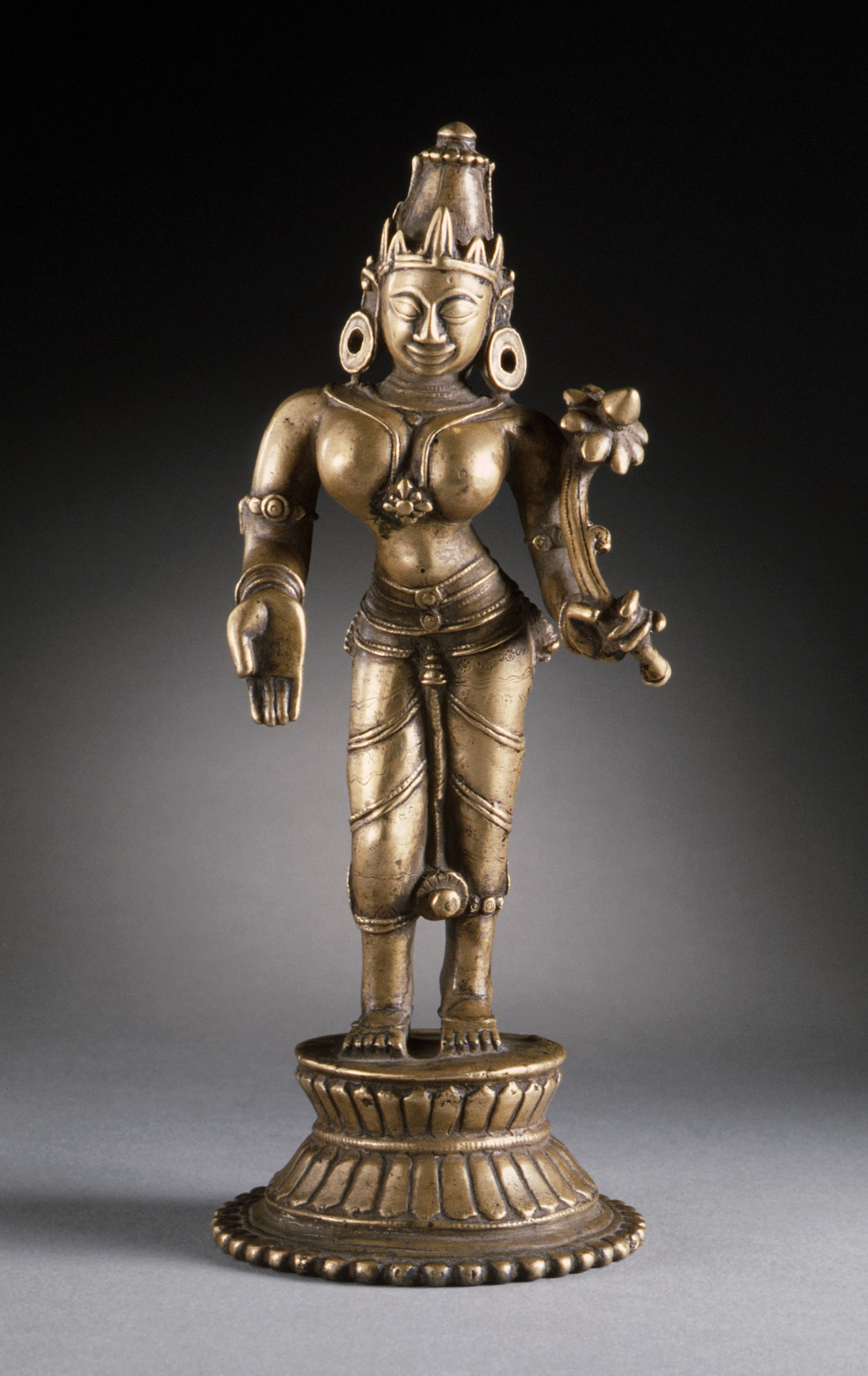
Statue of the goddess Shri-Lakshmi, 12-18th century, Odisha.

The Śrī Sūkta or Shri Sukta (Sanskrit: श्रीसूक्तम्, romanized: Śrīsūktam), also called the Shri Suktam, is the earliest recorded Sanskrit devotional hymns that revere Shri-Lakshmi, the Hindu goddess of wealth, prosperity, and fertility. The Shri Sukta is recited, with a strict adherence to Sanskrit prosody for the veneration of the goddess. This hymn is found in the Rigvedic khilani, which are appendices to the Rigveda that can be dated back to the pre-Buddhist era.

== Literary sources ==
The Shri Sukta forms part of the khilani or appendices to the Rigveda. These were late additions to the Rigveda, found only in the Bāṣkala śākhā, and the hymn exists in several strata that differ both in content and period of composition. For instance, according to J. Scheftelowitz, stratum 1 consists of verses 1–19 (with verses 3–12 addressed to the goddess Shri and 1–2 and 13–17 to Lakshmi), while the second stratum has verses 16–29 (i.e., the second version deletes verses 16–19 of the first). The third stratum, with verses beginning from number 23, similarly overlaps with the second version.

The first stratum is the most commonly attested and is usually appended to the Fifth Mandala of the Rigveda. Most of its verses were probably composed during the period of the Brahmanas, with a few added in the Upanishadic times. The second stratum post-dates the first; while the third is attested in a single, more recent, text.

== Text and symbolism ==
The goddess Shri appears in several earlier vedic hymns, and is the personification of auspicious and royal qualities. Shri Sukta is perhaps the first text in which the homology between Shri and Lakshmi is drawn, and the goddesses are further associated with the god of fire, Agni. Since the later epic period (ca 400 CE), Shri-Lakshmi is particularly associated with Vishnu as his wife or consort.

The Shri Sukta describes Shri as glorious, ornamented, royal, lustrous as gold, and radiant as fire, moon, and the sun. She is addressed as the bestower of fame, bounty and abundance in the form of gold, cattle, horses and food; and is entreated to banish her sister Alakshmi (misfortune), who is associated with need, hunger, thirst, and poverty. The hymn also associates Shri with (agrarian) fertility and she is described as the mother of kardama (mud), moist, perceptible through odour, and producing abundant harvest. This suktam also brings powerful healing energy to the manipura chakra (solar plexus chakra).

The Shri Sukta uses the motifs of lotus (padma or kamala) and elephant (gaja) – symbols that are consistently linked with the goddess Shri-Lakshmi in later references. The lotus is thought to be symbolic of purity, beauty, spiritual power, life, fertility, growth or, in Tantra, the entire created universe. It is a recurring motif in Hindu (as well as Buddhist and Jain) literature and a lotus growing from Vishnu's navel is said to mark the beginning of a new cosmic creation. The elephants are symbolic of royalty and, in Hindu mythology, are also related with cloud and rain; they thus reinforce Shri-Lakshmi's stature as the goddess of abundance and fertility.

Later Hindu iconography often represents Shri-Lakshmi in the form of Gaja-Lakshmi, standing on a lotus, flanked by two elephants that are shown showering her with water with their trunks.

== Recital in Tirumala ==
The Shri Sukta is one of the Pañca-Sūktam (five Suktams) recited during the 3-hour long Thirumanjanam of Venkateswara, at the famed ancient Hill Shrine of the Tirumala Venkateswara Temple in Andhra Pradesh, India. The Thirumanjanam to the main deity is performed every Friday. The Shri Suktam is also recited during the daily Arjitha Vasanthotsavam seva.
