= Adi Shankara =

8th-century Indian Vedic scholar

His Holiness Adi Shankara
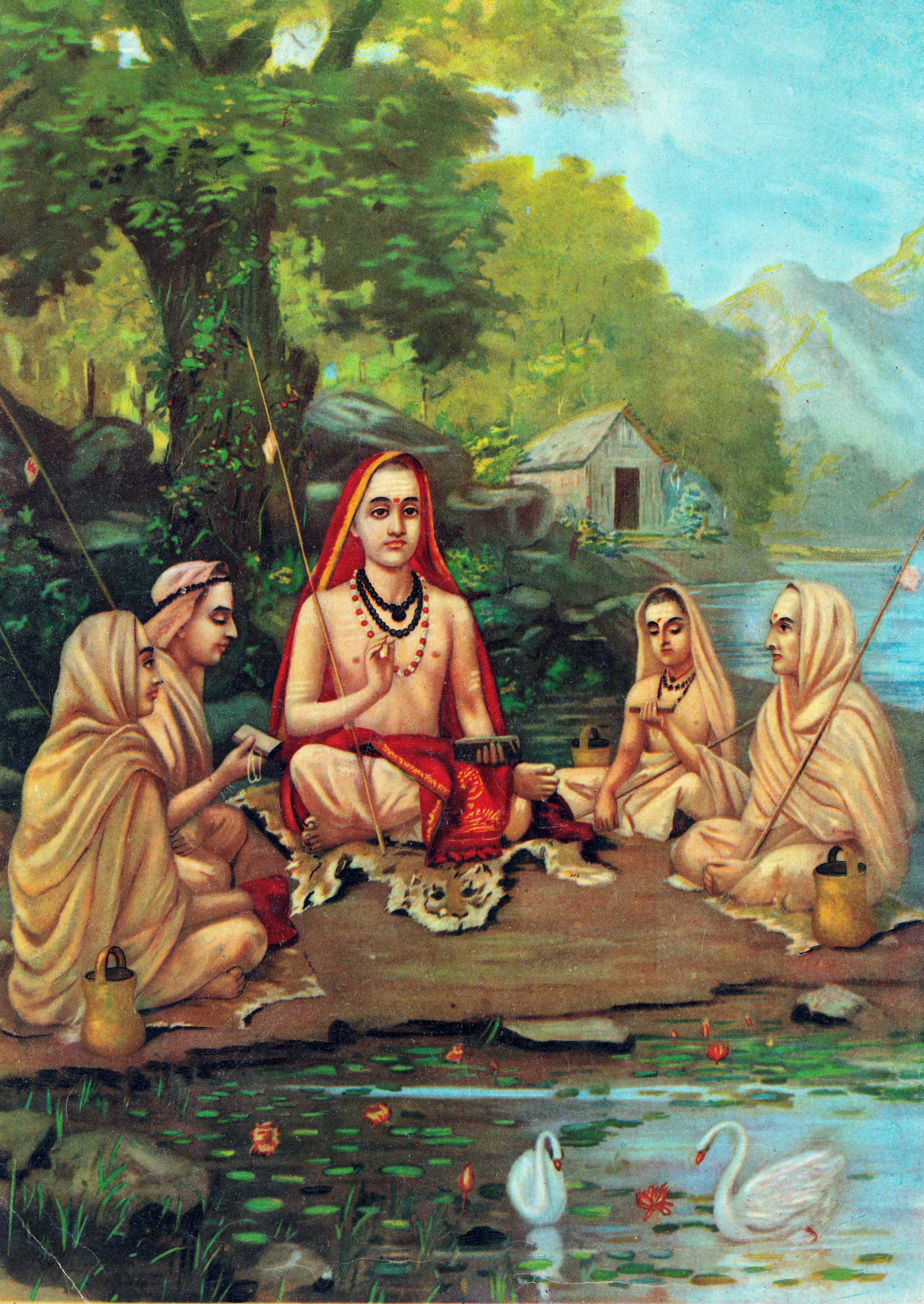
- Painting of Adi Shankara, exponent of Advaita Vedanta with his disciples by Raja Ravi Varma

Personal life
- Born: Shankara c. 700 CE (Note: Modern scholarship places Shankara in the earlier part of the 8th century CE (c. 700–750).(Koller 2013, p. 99, Comans 2000, p. 163, Mayeda 2015) Earlier generations of scholars proposed 788–820 CE.(Comans 2000, p. 163, Mayeda 2015 The cardinal Advaita matha's assign his dates as early as 509–477 BCE.)
- Died: c. 750 CE
- Known for: Expounded Advaita Vedanta
- Honors: Jagadguru

Religious life
- Religion: Hinduism
- Philosophy: Advaita Vedanta

Religious career
- Teacher: Govinda Bhagavatpada

Adi Shankara (8th c. CE), also called Adi Shankaracharya (Sanskrit: आदि शङ्कर, आदि शङ्कराचार्य, romanized: Ādi Śaṅkara, Ādi Śaṅkarācārya, lit. 'First Shankara', (Note: Adi means "first", to distinguish him from other Shankaras.) pronounced [aːd̪i ɕɐŋkɐraːt͡ɕaːrjɐ]), (Note: He is also known as Shankara Bhagavatpada (Śaṅkara Bhagavatpāda), Shankara Bhagavatpadacharya (Śaṅkara Bhagavatpādācārya) or Shankaracharya, sometimes spelled Sankaracharya.) was an Indian Vedic scholar-monk, philosopher, and teacher (acharya) of Advaita Vedanta. He wrote influential commentaries on the Brahma sutras and other texts, and in recent times is often revered as the most important Indian philosopher. Reliable information on Shankara's actual life is scant, and the historical influence of his works on Hindu intellectual thought has been questioned. The historical Shankara was probably relatively unknown and Vaishnava-oriented (Note: Vaishnava: Mayeda 1992, p. 4: "But his doctrine is far removed from Saivism and Saktism. It can be ascertained from his works that he had some faith in, or was favorable to, Vaishnavism.[13]" P.8 note 13 refers to Nakamura, Vedanta Tetsugaku no Hatten p.531, and Paul Hacker (1965), Relations of early Advaitins to Vaishnavism.; Clark 2006, p. 148: "Sankara, despite being projected as an incarnation of Siva in the hagiographies, was almost certainly a vaisnava, as were his immediate disciples."; Clark 2006, p. 167: "... it may be that he is best described as a refomed Pancaratrin or Bhagavata, Sankara-Bhagavat or Sankara-Bhagavatpada indeed being one of the names he uses to describe himself."; Clark 2006, p. 169: "It is apparent that Sankara was a vaisnava who seems to have been significantly informed by Pancaratra—as were Ramanuja and Madhva—yet Sankara's hagiographers project him as an 'orthodox' (Vedic) saiva. In the following chapter, it is proposed that Sankara's early hagiographies projected him as a Saiva in the image of their Viayanagara patrons who, beginning in the mid-fourteenth century, patronised what was essentially a 'reformed', 'orthodox' saiva tradition that included advaita saa matha-s and Vedic scholarship."; Nelson 2007, p. 313: "Indeed, as Hacker has shown, there is good evidence that Shankara and his early followers came from strong Vaishnava backgrounds."; See also J.G. Suthren Hirst (2005), Samkara's Advaita Vedanta: Suthren Hirst 2005, p. 28: "In this respect, it is telling that Samkara uses Visnu's relation to his image in a range of contexts, for example, to illustrate the use of Om in meditating on brahman, yet never mentions the lingam, the equivalent aniconic form of Siva. He refers specifically to the salagrama, the small round polished stone from the river Gandaki in which Visnu is worshipped. He also appears to sanction the temple-going and other activities of worship practised by Bhagavata Vaisnavas, though he disagrees with the Pañcaratra theology he discusses alongside this (BSBh 2.2.42–45). No such approbation is given of Saiva practices, the discussion of their theology being much briefer and linked with the refutation of Vaisesika and similar views (BSBh 2.2.37). In addition, his references to release by stages (kramamukti) have a Vaisnava background traceable to the earlier commentator on the Brahma sutras. These factors suggest at least familiarity with a Vaisnava milieu, which we will need to take into account in understanding his thought."; Suthren Hirst 2005, p. 130: "... the very frequency of Samkara's references to Visnu and his images cannot be ignored, though their context has to be carefully considered. Other Vaisnava clues are linked with quotations from the Katha Upanisad on the highest place of Visnu, moderate criticism of the Vaisnava Bhagavatas (unclearly distinguished from Pañcaratras) and expansion of passages in the Gita, itself a Vaisnava text. In the following, then, I am not arguing that Samkara is explicating Advaita for a specific Vaisnava community. Rather, I am suggesting that he draws on familiarity with a Vaisnava environment to help his pupils realize the truth of non-duality, a truth to which he himself may well have been drawn from a similar starting point.") and his true impact lies in the popular perception of him as a heroic religious leader who re-established traditional Hinduism. (Note: Folk-hero and digvijana: Sundaresan (2000, p. 154): "It should also be noted that the more scholastic focus on Sankara as a composer of bhasyas is limited to the core of the monastic tradition. In the popular perception, Sankara's fame has more to do with his reputation as a religious leader who harmonized the major Hindu traditions, visited various temples, and composed hymns."; Frank Whaling (1979), Sankara and Buddhism, Journal of Indian Philosophy Vol. 7, No. 1 (MARCH 1979), pp. 1-42: "Hindus of the Advaita persuasion (and others too) have seen in Sankara the one who restored the Hindu dharma against the attacks of the Buddhists (and Jains) and in the process helped to drive Buddhism out of India."; King (2001, pp. 129–130): "...even at a popular level, Hindus have been educated to believe that Sankara was a central figure in their cultural and intellectual history. Thus, Advaita has gained a significant degree of generalized cultural power in modern India as an iconic representation of Hindu religion and culture without necessarily being able to depend upon widespread adoption of or adherence to its fundamental belief system or traditions by Hindus."; Hacker (1995, p. 29): "By means of legends, which he [Vidyaranya] created, he made of Sankara, whose philosophy he followed but who could never become popular with his elevated, exacting thoughts, a divine folk-hero who spread his teaching through his digvijaya ("universal conquest") all over India like a victorious conqueror, and whom therefor the Hindu, in his struggles with the poweful drive of Islam, could look up to."; Kulke & Rothermund (1998, p. 177): "His brother Vidyaranya empgasized Shankara's philosophy which provided a unified ideology of Hinduism. It may be that he invented the story of Shankara's great tour of India and the establishment of the four great monasteries in the four corners of the country. If he did not invent it, he at last saw to it that it would gain universal currency and that the Shankaracaryas, as the abbots of the monasteries were called, would emerge as the guardians of the Hindu faith. The fact that Vidyaranya's monastery at Sringeri was supposed to be one of Shankara's four original establishments, coupled with its position close to the old Hoysala capital, was certainly of great importance for the legitimation of the new rulers favoured by Vidyaranya's blessing.") (Note: The BJP and Shankara: Viswanathan (2022): "the BJP will be taking one more step towards its plan to project Sankaracharya as an icon of cultural integration of Bharat [...] The BJP sees Sankaracharya as someone who had united the Hindus and it was former BJP president Amit Shah who gave momentum to the process by describing him as someone who “successfully united Hindus’’ in 2020."; Puniyani (2016): "... why is there an attempt to project Shankar as the philosopher who represents India? [...] it is on the agenda of the RSS-BJP, which is at present ruling the country, to turn India into a Hindu nation based on Hindutva. The ideology, Hindutva, in turn, is constructed around brahmanic values of hierarchy based on birth. Shankar is the strongest proponent of Brahmanic values. The politics in the name of religion is aimed at maintaining the status quo of cruel, exploitative social relations and is opposed to the values of liberty, equality and fraternity. Shankar provides the philosophical ground for this brand of politics."; Shaji (2022): "When Prime Minister Narendra Modi visits the Adi Shankara Janmabhoomi Temple at Kalady village near Cochin International Airport on Thursday, 1 September, it will herald an almost total Sangh Parivar appropriation of the rich legacy of the exceptional philosopher who propagated the Advaita ideal [...] For the RSS-BJP, Shankara’s “digvijaya” conquest is a solid foundation in which it develops its nationalistic project where faith, philosophy, and geography are blended together [...] the BJP wants its renewed focus on Shankara to help strengthen the Hindutva ideology at the national level [...] Sangh Parivar ideologues believe no other metaphor will work like Shankaracharya"; J. Nandakumar, "RSS ideologue and national convenor of Prajna Pravah, a Sangh think tank", quoted by Viswanathan (2022): "Sri Adi Sankaracharya is the symbol of Indian intellectual tradition. He was the great unifier of Bharat and he integrated the whole nation. The spiritual foundation laid down by Adi Sankaracharya helped Bharat to survive a series of brutal invasions. Hence, the PM’s visit to Adi Sankara’s birthplace at Kalady during Azadi Ka Amrit Mahotsav has a historical relevance."; Shivraj Singh Chouhan, quoted by Mohan J (2022b): "Endowed with self-knowledge, Acharya played a crucial role in reviving Sanatan Dharma, advocating for the philosophy of Advaita Vedanta and promoting cultural unity."; See also: Pattanaik (2020), "Who is a Hindu? - What they don’t tell you about Advaita"; Pattanaik (2024), "What do we really know about Adi Shankaracharya?", Deccan Herald; Arun Murthi (2025), "Opinion: How scholarship on Adi Shankaracharya ignores his sectarian views", The News Minute)

Until the 10th century Shankara was overshadowed by his older contemporary Maṇḍana Miśra, and there is no mention of him in concurrent Hindu, Buddhist or Jain sources until the 11th century. The legendary Shankara was created in the 14th century, centuries after his death, when Sringeri maṭha (monastery, temple-school) started to receive patronage from the emperors of the Vijayanagara Empire and shifted their allegiance from Advaitic Agamic Shaivism to Brahmanical Advaita orthodoxy. Hagiographies dating from the 14th-17th centuries deified him as a ruler-renunciate, travelling on a digvijaya (conquest of the four quarters) across the Indian subcontinent to propagate his philosophy, defeating his opponents in theological debates. These hagiographies also portray him as founding four mathas. Adi Shankara also came to be regarded as the organiser of the Dashanami monastic order, and the unifier of the Shanmata tradition of worship. The title of Shankaracharya, used by heads of certain monasteries in India, is derived from his name. Tradition also portrays him as the one who reconciled the various sects (Vaishnavism, Shaivism, and Shaktism) with the introduction of the Pañcāyatana form of worship, the simultaneous worship of five deities – Ganesha, Surya, Vishnu, Shiva, and Devi, arguing that all deities were but different forms of the one Brahman, the invisible Supreme Being.

Owing to his later fame over 300 texts are attributed to him, including commentaries (bhāṣya), introductory topical expositions (prakaraṇa grantha) and poetry (stotra). However, most of these are likely to have been written by admirers, or pretenders, or scholars with an eponymous name. Works widely accepted to have been written by Shankara himself are the Brahmasutrabhasya, his commentaries on ten principal Upanishads, his commentary on the Bhagavad Gita, and the Upadeśasāhasrī. The authenticity of Shankara as the author of the Vivekacūḍāmaṇi has been questioned and mostly rejected by scholarship.

His authentic works present a harmonizing reading of the shastras, with liberating knowledge of the self at its core, synthesizing the inherited Advaita Vedanta teachings of his time. (Note: Neil Dalal (2021), Shankara, Stanford Encyclopedia of Philosophy) The central concern of Shankara's writings was the liberating knowledge of the true identity of jīvātman (individual self) as Ātman-Brahman, emphasizing that "right knowledge arises at the moment of hearing" the mahāvākyas. These mahavakyas are found in the Upanishads, which Shankara saw as the authoritative means of knowledge, beyond the ritually oriented Mīmāṃsā-exegesis of the Vedas. (Note: Shankara, himself, had renounced all religious ritual acts. For an example of Shankara's reasoning "why rites and ritual actions should be given up", see Karl Potter on p. 220; Elsewhere, Shankara's Bhasya on various Upanishads repeat "give up rituals and rites", see for example Shankara's Bhasya on Brihadaranyaka Upanishad pp. 348–350, 754–757) (Note: Compare Mookerji 2011 on Svādhyāya (Vedic learning). Mookerji (2011, pp. 29–31) notes that the Rigveda, and Sayana's commentary, contain passages criticizing as fruitless mere recitation of the Ŗik (words) without understanding their inner meaning or essence, the knowledge of dharma and Parabrahman. Mookerji (2011, pp. 29, 34) concludes that in the Rigvedic education of the mantras "the contemplation and comprehension of their meaning was considered as more important and vital to education than their mere mechanical repetition and correct pronunciation." Mookerji (2011, p. 35) refers to Sayana as stating that "the mastery of texts, akshara-praptī, is followed by artha-bodha, perception of their meaning." (Artha may also mean "goal, purpose or essence," depending on the context. According to Mookerji (2011, p. 36), "the realization of Truth" and the knowledge of paramatman as revealed to the rishis is the real aim of Vedic learning, and not the mere recitation of texts.) Shankara's Advaita showed influences from Mahayana Buddhism, despite Shankara's critiques; and Hindu Vaishnava opponents have even accused Shankara of being a "crypto-Buddhist," (Note: King (1995, p. 183): "It is well-known that Sankara was criticized by later (rival) Vedantins as a crypto-Buddhist (pracchana bauddha).) a qualification which is rejected by the Advaita Vedanta tradition, highlighting their respective views on Atman, Anātman and Brahman. (Note: Atman versus anatman: (Isaeva 1993, pp. 60, 145–154); KN Jayatilleke (2010), Early Buddhist Theory of Knowledge, ISBN 978-81-208-0619-1, p. 246–249, from note 385 onwards; Steven Collins (1994), Religion and Practical Reason (Editors: Frank Reynolds, David Tracy), State Univ of New York Press, ISBN 978-0-7914-2217-5, p. 64: "Central to Buddhist soteriology is the doctrine of not-self (Pali: anattā, Sanskrit: anātman, the opposed doctrine of Ātman is central to Brahmanical thought). Put very briefly, this is the [Buddhist] doctrine that human beings have no soul, no self, no unchanging essence."; Edward Roer (Translator), Shankara's Introduction at Google Books; Javanaud (2013), "Is The Buddhist 'No-Self' Doctrine Compatible With Pursuing Nirvana?", Philosophy Now; John C. Plott et al. (2000), Global History of Philosophy: The Axial Age, Volume 1, Motilal Banarsidass, ISBN 978-81-208-0158-5, p. 63: "The Buddhist schools reject any Ātman concept. As we have already observed, this is the basic and ineradicable distinction between Hinduism and Buddhism".)

== Dating ==
Several different dates have been proposed for Shankara. While the Advaita tradition assigns him to the 5th century BCE, the scholarly-accepted dating places Shankara to be a scholar from the first half of the 8th century CE.

=== Matha datings ===
The prominent Advaita-mathas date Shankara to the 5th century BCE. This dating is based on records of the heads of Shankara's cardinal institutions Maṭhas. The exact dates of birth of Adi Shankaracharya believed by several monasteries are Kali 2593 (509 BCE) according to the Kanchipuram, (Note: The successive heads of the Kanchi and all other major Hindu Advaita tradition monasteries have been called Shankaracharya leading to some confusion, discrepancies and scholarly disputes. The chronology stated in Kanchi Matha texts recognizes five major Shankaras: Adi, Kripa, Ujjvala, Muka and Abhinava. According to the Kanchi Matha tradition, it is "Abhinava Shankara" that western scholarship recognizes as the Advaita scholar Shankara, while the monastery continues to recognize its 509 BCE chronology. Also, as per astronomical details given in books Shankara Satpatha, Shankara Vijaya, Brihat Shakara Vijaya and Prachina Shankara Vijaya, it is believed that Shankaracharya was born in 509 BCE. According to Kanhi Peetham, having established his divine mission, the incomparable Sankara attained his BrahmTbhava (identity with Brahman) at Kanchi, in the precincts of Sri Kamakshi, in his 32nd year, in 2625 Kali, in the cyclic year Raktakshi, corresponding to 476 B.C.) 507 BCE according to Govardhan Math, 491 BCE according to Dvarka (Dvārakā), (Note: Arun Kumar Upadhyay: "The copper-plate of King Sudhanwa, said to have been issued to Sankara and now in the possession of Government on behalf of Dwärká Mutt, bears the date as Yudhisthira Saka 2663, Åsvin Sukla 15. This gives us 476 B.C. as the relevant year of his death. The copper-plate seems to have been issued to Sankara right towards the end of his career. King Sudhanwa is referred to not only by Jinavijaya but also by biographers like Madhava and Sadánanda." Citsukha's Brhat-Sankara Vijaya also gives us the year of 2663 of Yudhi. Saka i.e., 476 B.C. as the year of Sankara's passing away.) 485 BCE according to Jyotirmath, 484 BCE according to Jagannatha Puri, and 483 BCE according to Sringeri.

The records of the Sringeri Matha state that Shankara was born in the 14th year of the reign of "Vikramaditya", but it is unclear to which king this name refers. Though some researchers identify the name with Chandragupta II (4th century CE), modern scholarship accepts the Vikramaditya as being from the Chalukya dynasty of Badami, most likely Vikramaditya II (733–746 CE).

=== Scholarly datings ===
- 788–820 CE: This was proposed by late 19th and early twentieth century scholars, following K.P. Tiele, (Note: Tiele based this dating on Yajnesvara Sastri's treatise Aryavidya-sudhakar ("The Moon of Noble Knowledge"), who in turn cited Bhatta Nilakantha's work Sankara-mandara-saurabha ("The fragrance of Sankara's paradise tree").) and was customarily accepted by scholars such as Max Müller, Macdonnel, Pathok, Deussen and Radhakrishna. Though the 788–820 CE dates are widespread in 20th-century publications, recent scholarship has questioned the 788–820 CE dates. (Note: The date 788–820 is also among those considered acceptable by Swami Tapasyananda, though he raises a number of questions.)
- c. 700 – c. 750 CE: Late 20th-century and early 21st-century scholarship tends to place Shankara's life in the first half of the 8th century. (Note: Koller 2013, p. 99: "the best recent scholarship argues that he was born in 700 and died in 750 CE.") This estimate is based on the probable earliest and latest limits for his lifetime. His works contains traces of debates with Buddhist and Mimansa authors from the 5th-7th century, setting the earliest limit at c. 650 CE. The latest limit is established by Vachaspati Mishra's commentary on Sankara's work, dated first half of the 9th century, thus setting the latest limit for Sankara at c. 800 CE.

=== Other datings ===
- 44–12 BCE: the commentator Anandagiri believed he was born at Chidambaram in 44 BCE and died in 12 BCE.
- 6th century CE: Telang placed him in this century. Sir R.G. Bhandarkar believed he was born in 680 CE.
- 805–897 CE: Venkiteswara not only places Shankara later than most, but also had the opinion that it would not have been possible for him to have achieved all the works apportioned to him, and has him live ninety-two years.

== Traditional and historical views on Shankara ==
=== Traditional views of Shankara ===
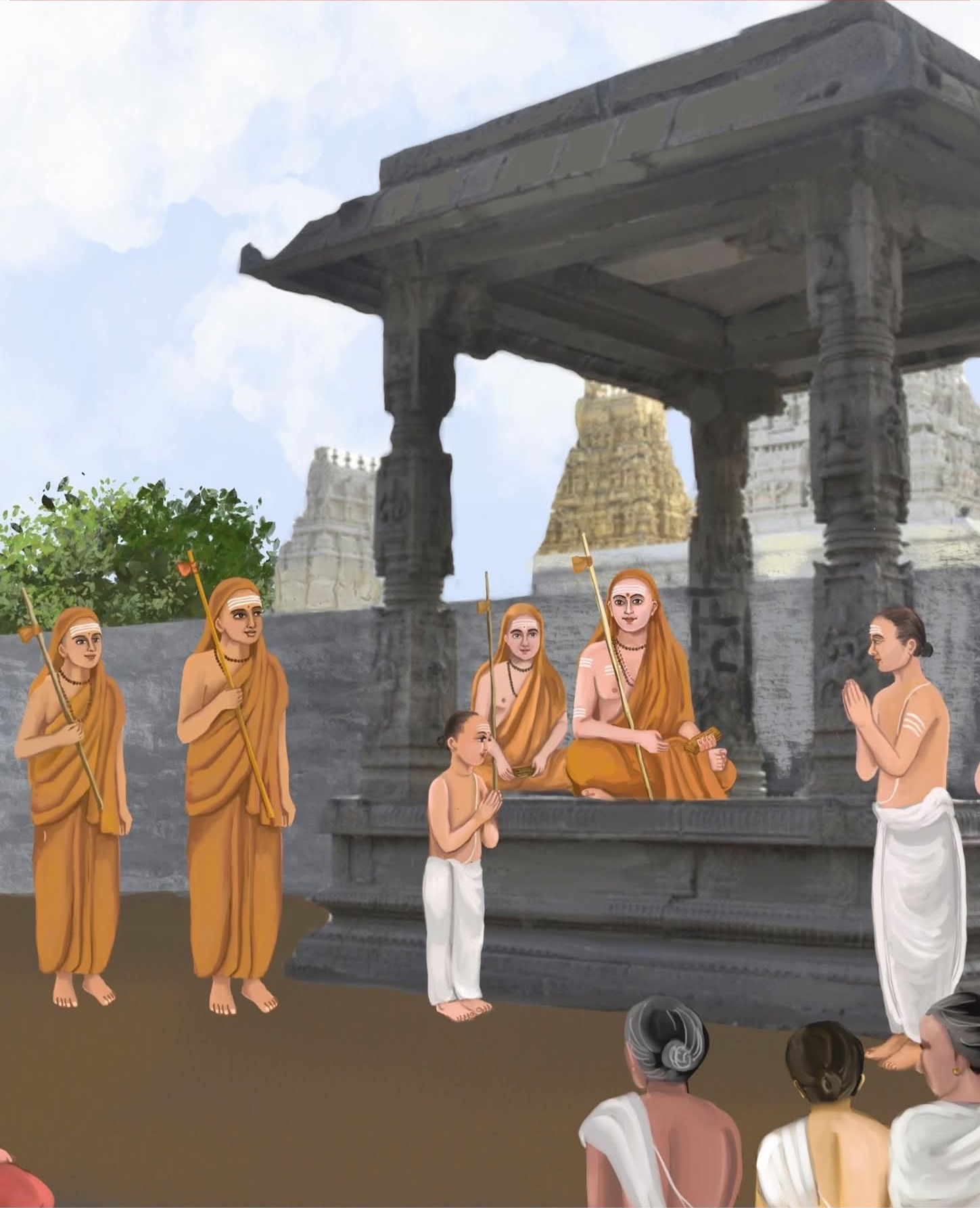

Shankara has an unparalleled status in the tradition of Advaita Vedanta. Hagiographies from the 14th-17th centuries portray him as a victor who travelled all over India to help restore the study of the Vedas. According to Frank Whaling, some Hindus, particularly those who follow Advaita, view Shankara as someone who defended Hindu dharma in response to Buddhist and Jain challenges and contributed to the decline of Buddhism in India. His teachings and tradition are central to Smartism and have influenced Sant Mat lineages. Tradition portrays him as the one who reconciled the various sects (Vaishnavism, Shaivism, and Shaktism) with the introduction of the Panchayatna form of worship, the simultaneous worship of five deities – Ganesha, Surya, Vishnu, Shiva, and Devi, arguing that all deities were but different forms of the one Brahman, the invisible Supreme Being, implying that Advaita Vedanta stood above all other traditions.

=== Historical Shankara and (lack of) early influence (until 10th century) ===
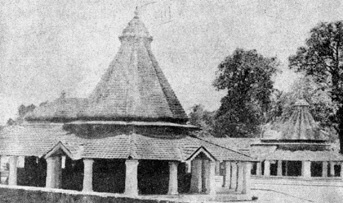
The birthplace of Adi Shankara at Kalady

Scholars have questioned Shankara's early influence in India. The Buddhist scholar Richard E. King states,

Although it is common to find Western scholars and Hindus arguing that Shankaracharya was the most influential and important figure in the history of Hindu intellectual thought, this does not seem to be justified by the historical evidence.

According to numerous scholars, Shankara and other early Advaitins were probably Vaishnavites, or at least teaching in a Vaishnava-oriented milieu, and Shankara may have had a Pancharatra background.

According to Clark, "Shankara was relatively unknown during his life-time, and probably for several centuries after, as there is no mention of him in Buddhist or Jain sources for centuries; nor is he mentioned by other important philosophers of the ninth and tenth centuries." According to King, until the 10th century, Shankara's works seem to have been overshadowed by his older contemporary Maṇḍana Miśra; (Note: King 2002, p. 128: "Although it is common to find Western scholars and Hindus arguing that Sankaracarya was the most influential and important figure in the history of Hindu intellectual thought, this does not seem to be justified by the historical evidence.") Roodurmun notes that Maṇḍana was considered the major representative of Advaita. Maṇḍana Miśra, a Mimansa scholar, follower of Kumarila Bhatta, and older contemporary of Shankara, wrote the Brahma-siddhi, a seminal text on Advaita that has survived into the modern era. The "theory of error" set forth in the Brahma-siddhi became the normative in later Advaita Vedanta discussion of error. His student Vachaspati Miśra, who is believed by Advaita tradition to have been an incarnation of Shankara to popularize the Advaita view, wrote the Bhamati (Bhāmatī), a commentary on Shankara's Brahma Sutra Bhashya, and the Brahmatattva-samiksa, a commentary on Mandana Mishra's Brahma-siddhi. His thought was mainly inspired by Mandana Mishra, and harmonises Shankara's thought with that of Mandana Mishra. The Bhamati school takes an ontological approach. It sees the jiva (jīva) as the source of avidya (avidyā). It sees meditation as the main factor in the attainment of liberation, while the study of the Vedas and reflection are additional factors. The later Advaita Vedanta tradition identified Maṇḍana Mishra with Sureśvara, Shankara's pupil, believing that Maṇḍana Mishra became a disciple of Shankara after a public debate which Shankara won.

According to Satchidanandendra Sarasvati, "almost all the later Vedantins were influenced" by Mandana Mishra and Bhaskara "in working out their own line of thought". Potter notes that modern interpreters of Advaita such as Satchidanandendra Sarasvati argue that most post-Shankara Advaita Vedanta actually deviates from Shankara, and that only his student Sureśvara - whose interpretation had little influence, represents Shankara correctly. In this view, Shankara's influential student Padmapada misunderstood Shankara, while his views were maintained by the Sureshvara school. (Note: Potter (2006, pp. 6–7): "...these modern interpreters are implying that most Advaitins after Samkara's time are confused and basically mistaken, and that 99% of the extant classical interpretive literature on Samkara's philosophy is off the mark. This is clearly a remarkably radical conclusion. Yet, there is good reason to think that it may well be true.)

=== Vaishnavite Vedanta (10th-14th century) ===
Hajime Nakamura states that prior to Shankara, views similar to his already existed, but did not occupy a dominant position within the Vedanta. Until the 11th century, Vedanta itself was a peripheral school of thought; Vedanta became a major influence when it was utilized by various sects of Hinduism to ground their doctrines. The early Vedanta scholars were from the upper classes of society, well-educated in traditional culture. They formed a social elite, "sharply distinguished from the general practitioners and theologians of Hinduism." Their teachings were "transmitted among a small number of selected intellectuals". Works of the early Vedanta schools do not contain references to Vishnu or Shiva. It was only after Shankara that "the theologians of the various sects of Hinduism utilized Vedanta philosophy to a greater or lesser degree to form the basis of their doctrines," whereby "its theoretical influence upon the whole of Indian society became final and definitive." Examples are Ramanuja (11th c.), who aligned bhakti, "the major force in the religions of Hinduism," with philosophical thought, meanwhile rejecting Shankara's views, (Note: Encyclopædia Britannica, Ramanajua) and the Nath-tradition.

=== Vijayanagara Empire and Vidyaranya (14th century) - creation of legendary (hagiographic) views ===
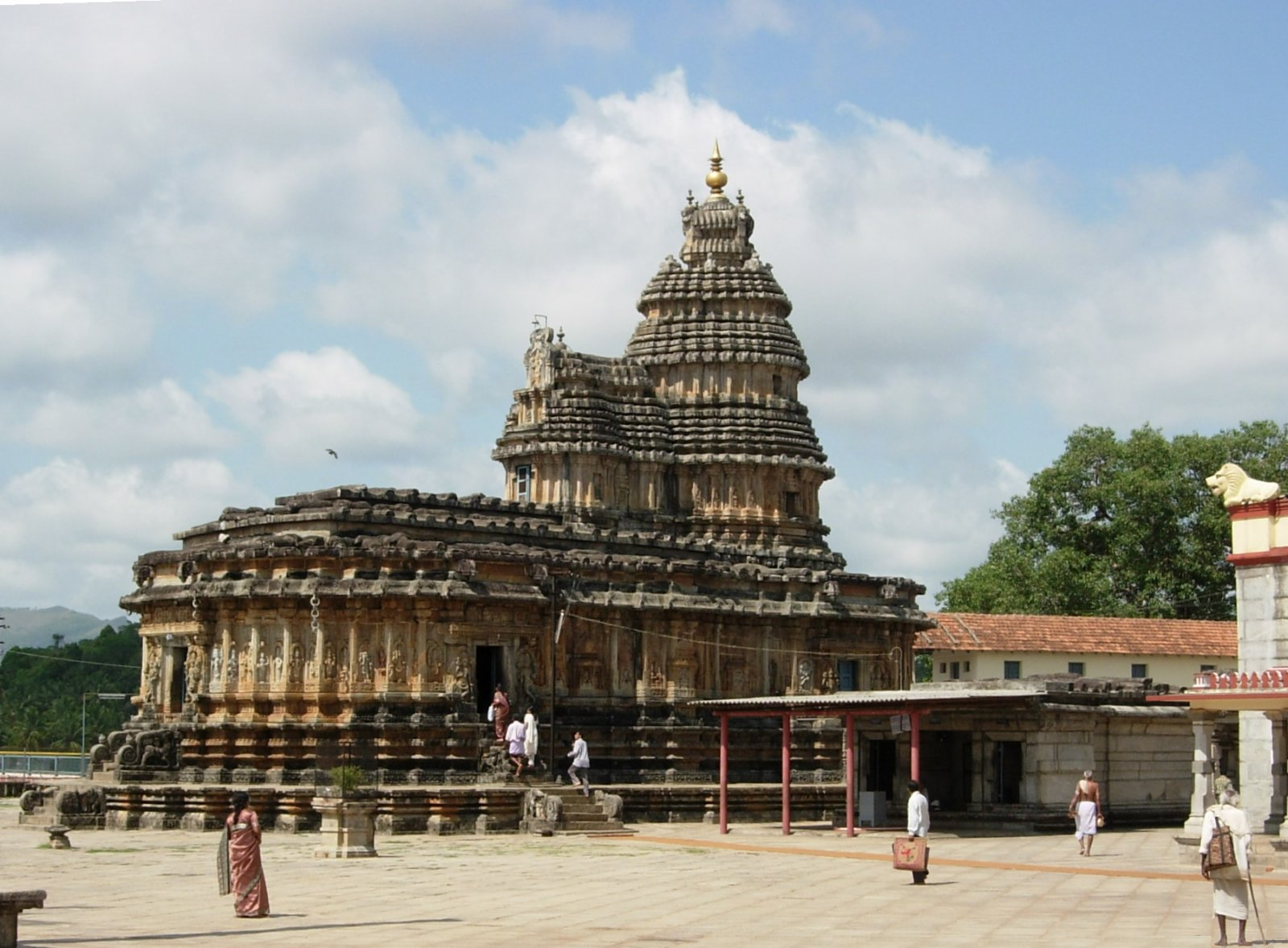
Vidyashankara temple at Sringeri Sharada Peetham, Shringeri

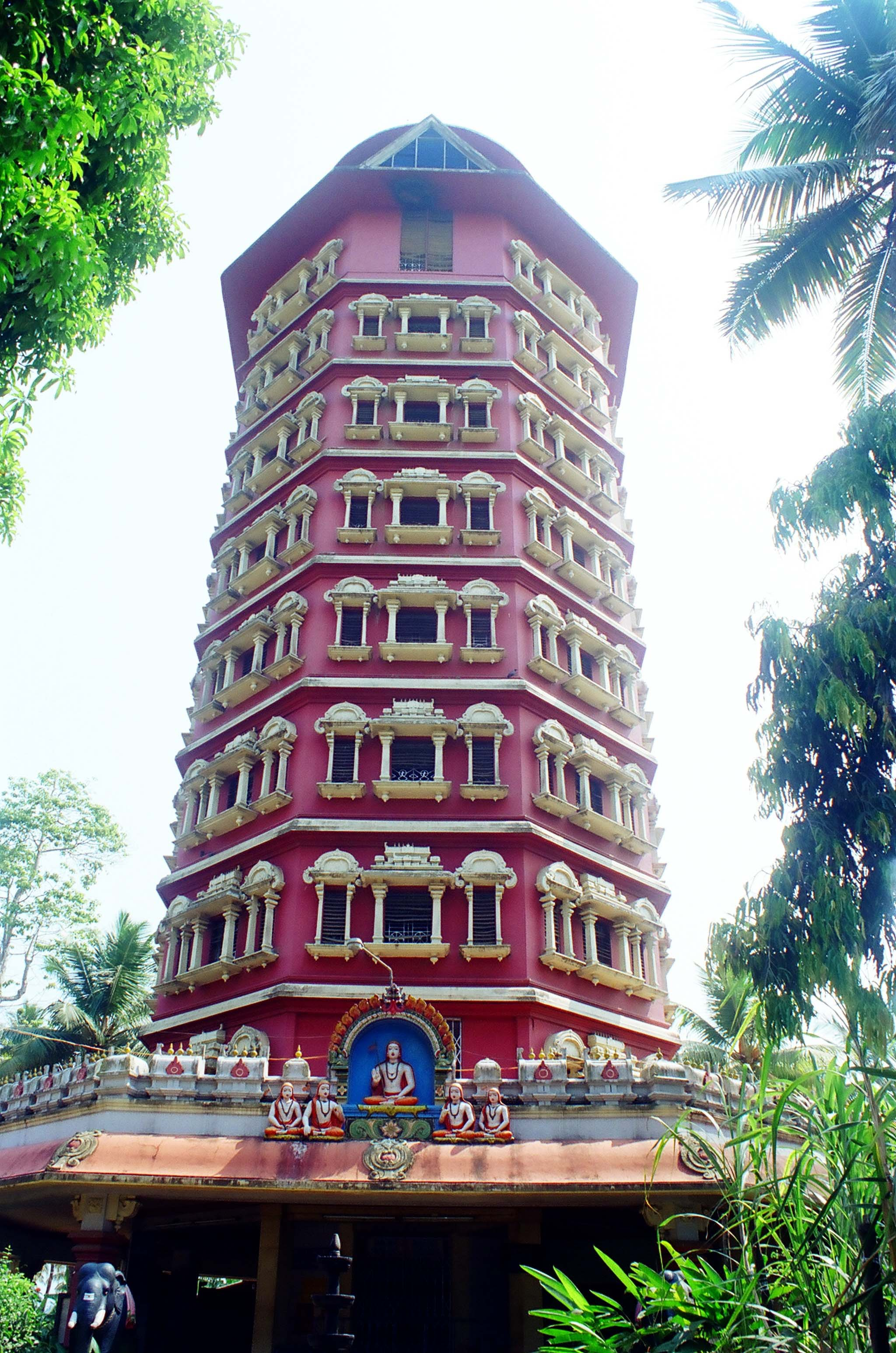
Adi Sankara Keerthi Sthampa Mandapam, Kalady, Kochi

In medieval times, Advaita Vedanta position as most influential Hindu darsana started to take shape, as Advaitins in the Vijayanagara Empire competed for patronage from the royal court, and tried to convert others to their sect. It is only during this period that the historical fame and cultural influence of Shankara and Advaita Vedanta was established. Many of Shankara's biographies were created and published in and after the 14th century, such as Vidyaranya's widely cited Śankara-vijaya. Vidyaranya, also known as Madhava, who was the 12th Jagadguru of the Śringeri Śarada Pītham from 1380 to 1386 and a minister in the Vijayanagara Empire, inspired the re-creation of the Hindu Vijayanagara Empire of South India. This may have been in response to the devastation caused by the Islamic Delhi Sultanate, but his efforts were also targeted at Sri Vaishnava groups, especially Visishtadvaita, which was dominant in territories conquered by the Vijayanagara Empire. Furthermore, sects competed for patronage from the royal court, and tried to convert others to their own sectarian system. Vidyaranya and his brothers, note Paul Hacker and other scholars, wrote extensive Advaitic commentaries on the Vedas and Dharma to make "the authoritative literature of the Aryan religion" more accessible. Vidyaranya was an influential Advaitin, and he created legends to turn Shankara, whose elevated philosophy had no appeal to gain widespread popularity, into a "divine folk-hero who spread his teaching through his digvijaya ("universal conquest," see below) all over India like a victorious conqueror." In his doxography Sarvadarśanasaṅgraha ("Summary of all views") Vidyaranya presented Shankara's teachings as the summit of all darsanas, presenting the other darsanas as partial truths which converged in Shankara's teachings, which was regarded to be the most inclusive system. The Vaishanava traditions of Dvaita and Visishtadvaita were not classified as Vedanta, and placed just above Buddhism and Jainism, reflecting the threat they posed for Vidyaranya's Advaita allegiance. Bhedabheda wasn't mentioned at all, "literally written out of the history of Indian philosophy." Such was the influence of the Sarvadarśanasaṅgraha, that early Indologists also regarded Advaita Vedanta as the most accurate interpretation of the Upanishads. And Vidyaranya founded a matha, proclaiming that it was established by Shankara himself. Vidyaranya enjoyed royal support, and his sponsorship and methodical efforts helped establish Shankara as a rallying symbol of values, spread historical and cultural influence of Shankara's Vedānta philosophies, and establish mathas to expand the cultural influence of Shankara and Advaita Vedānta.

=== Hagiographies: Digvijaya - "The conquests of Shankara" (14th-17th century) ===
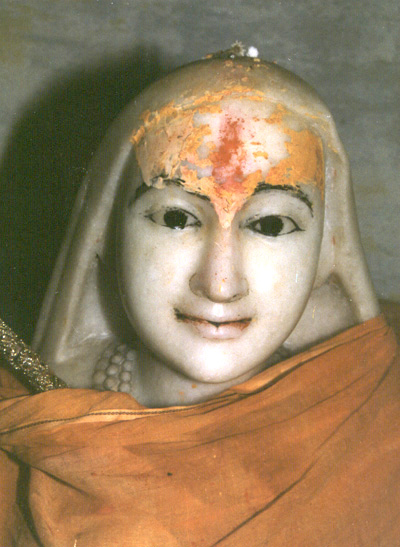
Murti of Shankara at his Samadhi Mandir, behind Kedarnath Temple, in Kedarnath, India

Reliable information on Shankara's actual life is scanty. His existing biographies are not historical accurate documents, but politically motivated hagiographies which were all written several centuries after his time and abound in legends and improbable events, creating the popular image of Shankara as "a religious leader who harmonized the major Hindu traditions, visited various temples, and composed hymns."

==== Sources ====
There are at least fourteen different known hagiographies of Adi Shankara's life. These, as well as other hagiographical works on Shankara, were written many centuries to a thousand years after Shankara's death, in Sanskrit and non-Sanskrit languages, and the hagiographies are filled with legends and fiction, often mutually contradictory. (Note: The hagiographies of Shankara mirror the pattern of synthesizing facts, fiction and legends as with other ancient and medieval era Indian scholars. Some hagiographic poems depict Shankara as a reincarnation of deity Shiva, much like other Indian scholars are revered as reincarnation of other deities; for example, Mandana-misra is depicted as an embodiment of deity Brahma, Citsukha of deity Varuna, Anandagiri of Agni, among others. See Isaeva (1993, pp. 69–72).)

Many of these are called the Śankara Vijaya ('The conquests (digvijaya) of Shankara'), while some are called Guruvijaya, Sankarabhyudaya and Shankaracaryacarita. Of these, the Brhat-Sankara-Vijaya by Citsukha is the oldest hagiography but only available in excerpts, while Sankaradigvijaya by Mādhava (17th c.) and Sankaravijaya by Anandagiri are the most cited. Other significant hagiographies are the Cidvilāsīya Śaṅkara Vijayaṃ (of Cidvilāsa, c. between the 15th and 17th centuries), and the Keraļīya Śaṅkara Vijayaṃ (of the Kerala region, extant from c. the 17th century).

Scholars note that one of the most cited Shankara hagiographies, Anandagiri's, includes stories and legends about historically different people, but all bearing the same name of Sri Shankaracarya or also referred to as Shankara but likely meaning more ancient scholars with names such as Vidya-sankara, Sankara-misra and Sankara-nanda. Some hagiographies are probably written by those who sought to create a historical basis for their rituals or theories.

==== Early life ====
According to the oldest hagiographies, Shankara was born in the southern Indian state of Kerala, in a village named Kaladi sometimes spelled as Kalati or Karati. (Note: This may be present day Kalady in central Kerala. The house he was born in is still maintained as Melpazhur Mana.) According to Anantanandagiri's hagiography, Shankara was born in Chidambaram. According to the narratives, his parents were an aged, childless, couple who led a devout life of service to the poor. They named their child Shankara, meaning "giver of prosperity". His father died while Shankara was very young. Shankara's upanayanam, the initiation into student-life, had to be delayed due to the death of his father, and was then performed by his mother.

==== Sannyasa ====
Shankara's hagiographies describe him as someone who was attracted to the life of Sannyasa (hermit) from early childhood. His mother disapproved. A story, found in every hagiography, describes Shankara at age eight going to a river with his mother, Sivataraka, to bathe, where he is caught by a crocodile. Shankara calls out to his mother to give him permission to become a Sannyasin (a religious ascetic), or else the crocodile will kill him. The mother agrees and Shankara is freed, and leaves his home for education. He reaches a Saivite sanctuary along a river in a north-central state of India, and becomes the disciple of a teacher named Govinda Bhagavatpada. The stories in various hagiographies diverge in details about the first meeting between Shankara and his Guru, where they met, as well as what happened later. Several texts suggest Shankara's schooling with Govindapada happened along the river Narmada in Omkareshwar, but a few place it along the River Ganges in Kashi (Varanasi) as well as Badari (Badrinath in the Himalayas).

The hagiographies vary in their description of where he went, whom he met and debated and many other details of his life. Most mention Shankara studying the Vedas, Upanishads and Brahmasutra with Govindapada, and Shankara authoring several key works in his youth, while he was studying with his teacher. It is with his teacher Govinda, that Shankara studied Gaudapadiya Karika, as Govinda was himself taught by Gaudapada. Most also mention a meeting with scholars of the Mimansa school of Hinduism namely Kumarila and Prabhakara, as well as Mandana and various Buddhists, in Shastrartha (an Indian tradition of public philosophical debates attended by large number of people, sometimes with royalty).

==== Travels (Digvijaya) and disciples ====
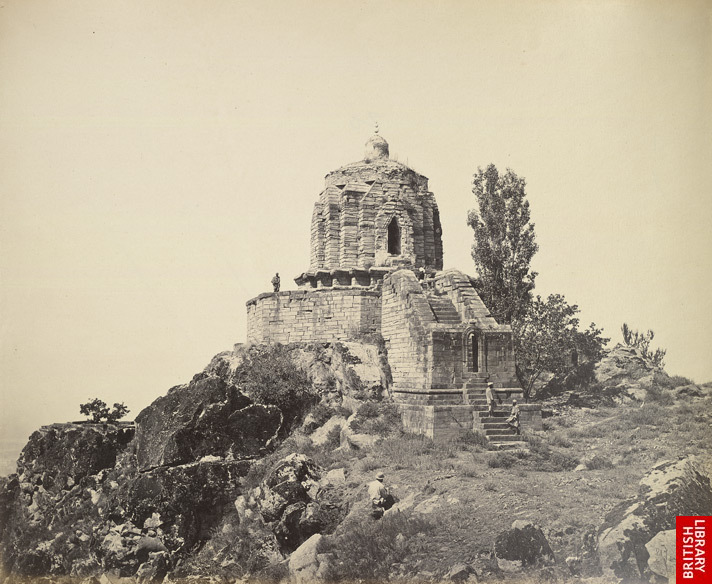
Takht-i-Suleiman, Srinugger Srinagar," a photo by Samuel Bourne, 1860's* (BL) The Shankaracharya hill where he is said to have meditated during his round of travels

Thereafter, the hagiographies about Shankara vary significantly. Different and widely inconsistent accounts of his life include diverse journeys, pilgrimages, public debates, installation of yantras and lingas, as well as the founding of monastic centers in north, east, west, and south India.

While the details and chronology vary, most hagiographies present Shankara as traveling widely within India, Gujarat to Bengal, and participating in public philosophical debates with different orthodox schools of Hindu philosophy, as well as heterodox traditions such as Buddhists, Jains, Arhatas, Saugatas, and Charvakas. The hagiographies credit him with starting several matha (monasteries), but this is uncertain. Ten monastic orders in different parts of India are generally attributed to Shankara's travel-inspired Sannyasin schools, each with Advaita notions, of which four have continued in his tradition: Bharati (Sringeri), Sarasvati (Kanchi), Tirtha and Asramin (Dvaraka). Other monasteries that record Shankara's visit include Giri, Puri, Vana, Aranya, Parvata and Sagara – all names traceable to the Ashrama system in Hinduism and Vedic literature.

Shankara had a number of disciple scholars during his travels, including Padmapadacharya(also called Sanandana, associated with the text Atma-bodha), Sureśvaracharya, Totakacharya, Hastamalakacharya, Chitsukha, Prthividhara, Chidvilasayati, Bodhendra, Brahmendra, Sadananda and others, who authored their own literature on Shankara and Advaita Vedanta.

==== Alleged deathplaces ====
According to a number of hagiographies, associated with the four cardinal maths, Adi Shankara died at Kedarnath, a Hindu pilgrimage site in the Himalayas, located in the northern Indian state of Uttarakhand. A 12-foot statue of Shankara was unveiled in 2021 at the reconstructed samadhi sthal (memorial site or tomb) at his alleged deathplace at Kedarnath.

According to the hagiographies related to the Kanchi Kamakoti Peetham Adi Shankara attained siddhi in Kanchi. The nearby Kamakshi Amman Temple of the Shaktism tradition has a shrine dedicated to this supposed final resting place of Adi Shankara. The Vyasacaliya, as well as the Madhaviya, state that Adi Shankara attained siddhi in Kashmir, after meeting Kumarila and Mandana at the Prayaga.

Pande also mentions Kerala as an alleged deathplace. According to the Tibetan Buddhist scholar Taranatha, Shankara ended his life by drowning himself in the Ganges.

=== Hagiographies: attribution of Mathas and Smarta tradition (14-17th century) ===
Traditionally, Shankara is regarded as the founder of the Daśanāmi Sampradāya of Hindu monasticism, and the Panchayatana puja and Ṣaṇmata of the Smarta tradition.

==== Dashanami Sampradaya and mathas ====
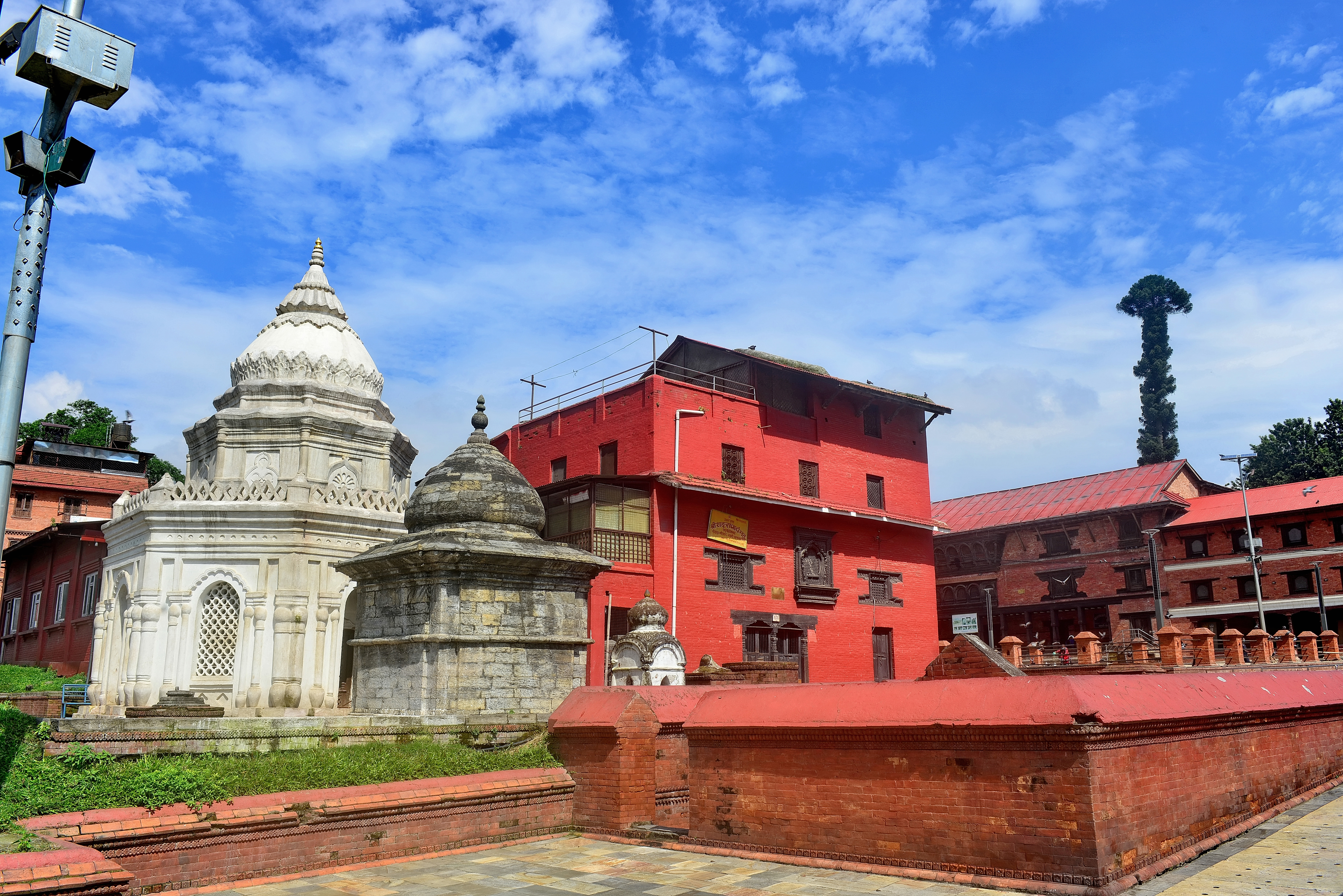
Adi Shankaracharya Math in Pashupatinath Temple, Nepal

Advaita Vedanta is, at least in the west, primarily known as a philosophical system. But it is also a tradition of renunciation. Philosophy and renunciation are closely related:

Most of the notable authors in the advaita tradition were members of the sannyasa tradition, and both sides of the tradition share the same values, attitudes and metaphysics.

In the 14th century an elaborate legend was created, presenting Shankara as an incarnation of Shiva to facilitate the adoption of his teachings by previously Shaiva (Śaiva)-oriented Mathas (Maṭhas) in the Vijayanagara Empire. From the 14th century onwards, hagiographies began to present Shankara as an incarnation of Shiva, portraying him as establishing the Daśanāmi Sampradaya, organizing a section of the Ekadandi monks under an umbrella grouping of ten names. Several other Hindu monastic and Ekadandi traditions, however, remained outside the organisation of the Dasanāmis.

According to tradition, Adi Sankara organised the Hindu monks of these ten sects or names under four mathas, with the headquarters at Dvārakā in the West, Jagannatha Puri in the East, Sringeri in the South and Badrikashrama in the North. Each matha was headed by one of his four main disciples, who each continues the Vedanta Sampradaya.

According to Paul Hacker, the system may have been initiated by Vidyaranya (14th c.), who may have founded a matha, proclaiming that it was established by Shankara himself, as part of his campaign to propagate Shankara's Advaita Vedanta. Vidyaranya enjoyed royal support, and his sponsorship and methodical efforts helped establish Shankara as a rallying symbol of values, spread historical and cultural influence of Shankara's Vedānta philosophies, and establish monasteries (mathas) to expand the cultural influence of Shankara and Advaita Vedānta.

==== Smarta Tradition ====
Traditionally, Shankara is regarded as the greatest teacher and reformer of the Smartism sampradaya, which is one of four major sampradaya of Hinduism. According to Alf Hiltebeitel, Shankara established the nondualist interpretation of the Upanishads as the touchstone of a revived smarta tradition:

Practically, Shankara fostered a rapprochement between Advaita and smarta orthodoxy, which by his time had not only continued to defend the varnasramadharma theory as defining the path of karman, but had developed the practice of pancayatanapuja ("five-shrine worship") as a solution to varied and conflicting devotional practices. Thus one could worship any one of five deities (Vishnu, Siva, Durga, Surya, Ganesa) as one's istadevata ("deity of choice").

Panchayatana puja (IAST Pañcāyatana pūjā) is a system of puja (worship) in the Smarta tradition. It consists of the worship of five deities set in a quincunx pattern, the five deities being Shiva, Vishnu, Devi, Surya, and an Ishta Devata such as Kartikeya, or Ganesha or any personal god of devotee's preference. Sometimes the Ishta Devata is the sixth deity in the mandala. while in the Shanmata system, Skanda, also known as Kartikeya and Murugan, is added. Panchayatana puja is a practice that became popular in medieval India, and has been attributed to Adi Shankara. However, archaeological evidence suggests that this practice long predates the birth of Adi Shankara. (Note: Many Panchayatana mandalas and temples have been uncovered that are from the Gupta Empire period, and one Panchayatana set from the village of Nand (about 24 kilometers from Ajmer) has been dated to belong to the Kushan Empire era (pre-300 CE). The Kushan period set includes Shiva, Vishnu, Surya, Brahma and one deity whose identity is unclear. According to James Harle, major Hindu temples from 1st millennium CE embed the pancayatana architecture very commonly, from Odisha to Karnataka to Kashmir; and the temples containing fusion deities such as Harihara (half Shiva, half Vishnu) are set in Panchayatana worship style.)

=== Neo-Vedanta (19-20th century) ===
Shankara's position was further established in the 19th and 20th-century, when neo-Vedantins and western Orientalists elevated Advaita Vedanta "as the connecting theological thread that united Hinduism into a single religious tradition," and became "an iconic representation of Hindu religion and culture," despite the fact that most Hindus do not adhere to Advaita Vedanta.

=== National icon of unity (21st century) ===
The BJP seeks to project Shankara as a national icon of unity and cultural integration of Bharat, and has supported the building of large statues honouring Shankara. (Note: According to Jain (2021, book synopsis), these and other statues, of Hindu, Buddhist, jain and secular icons, are an expression of political and religious forces, a "materialization" of the interplay between "new image technologies, neospiritual religious movements, Hindu nationalist politics, globalization, and Dalit-Bahujan verifications of equality and presence". According to Jain (2021, p. 2), these statues "have been increasingly deployed in "statue wars" in which politicians seek to outdo aone another in building spectacular statues for their electoral constituencies (known in India as vote banks), despite inevitable public criticism for squandering limited state resources on such symbolic projects". See also: Prasad (2019), "Why giant statues of Hindu gods and leaders are making Muslims in India nervous", The Conversation; Outlook News Desk (2022), "From Sages To Politicians, Why We Love Building Statues Of Prominent Figures", Outlook India; How Statue Wars Became A Prominent Feature Of Indian Political Landscape, OutlookIndia; World’s tallest statue opens amid surge in Indian mega-monuments, CNN; Ambade (2025), "Glorifying my gods: cultural politics of statue making, Hindu symbolism, and power iconography", Cultural Trends, Volume 34, 2025 - Issue 5) One of them is a 12-foot statue of Shankara at the reconstructed samādhi sthal (memorial site or tomb) dedicated to him at Kedarnath. (Note: 12-foot statue: Ambade (2025, p. 724-727): "... the current government in India aims to recreate Hindu nationalist iconography by creating and celebrating Hindu icons and symbols navigating Hindu identity [...] Following the BJP’s rise to power in India, statues of Hindu deities have become more prominent in public spaces [...] a 12-foot-high statue of Adi Shankaracharya in his samadhi sthal (burial place) at Kedarnath, Uttarakhand, a BJP-ruled state, was unveiled by Modi in November 2021. The statue honours the 8th-century Brahmin philosopher who played a crucial role in consolidating the Advaita Vedanta doctrine (Singh, 2021 ) [...] The BJP is known for its “Hindu Hindi Nationalism” (Jaffelot, 2021 ; Rai, 2001 ). Since its rule, it employed statues as signifiant political, cultural, and ideological apparatuses. However, the act is not merely to create “Hindu consciousness” (Jaffelot, 2021 ) but to subvert the secular iconography of public space. As Baru (2021 ) observes, the BJP’s Hindutva politics seeks to paper over the caste, class, and Hindi nationalism (Rai, 2001) divides to create pan-Indian Hindu consciousness and political constituency (p. 10)."; Viswanathan (2022): "the BJP will be taking one more step towards its plan to project Sankaracharya as an icon of cultural integration of Bharat [...] The BJP sees Sankaracharya as someone who had united the Hindus and it was former BJP president Amit Shah who gave momentum to the process by describing him as someone who “successfully united Hindus’’ in 2020. Following this, Prime Minister Narendra Modi had unveiled a 12-foot-high statue of Sri Sankaracharya at Kedarnath, the samadhi sthal of the seer, on November 5, 2021.") (Note: Kedarnath is one of the alleged places of death, according to some of the 14-17th century hagiographies.) The rebuilding of the samadhi, which was damaged in a deluge in 2013, was monitored by the office of the Prime Minister, and unveiled by BJP Prime Minister Narendra Modi. In similar vein, and despite financiel deficits and local opposition, a 108-foot statue of Adi Shankara, the statue of oneness, was built by the BJP-led Madhya Pradesh government near Omkareshwar Temple in Madhya Pradesh, (Note: Which he is said to have visited as a 12-year old child.) as part of a temple tourism project, and unveiled on 21 September 2023 by BJP Chief Minister Shivraj Singh Chouhan.

== Works ==
Adi Shankara is highly esteemed in contemporary Advaita Vedanta, and over 300 texts are attributed to his name, including commentaries (Bhāṣya), original philosophical expositions (Prakaraṇa grantha) and poetry (Stotra). However, most of these are not authentic works of Shankara, and are likely to be written by his admirers, or scholars whose name was also Shankaracharya. Piantelli has published a complete list of works attributed to Adi Sankara, along with issues of authenticity for most.

=== Authentic works ===
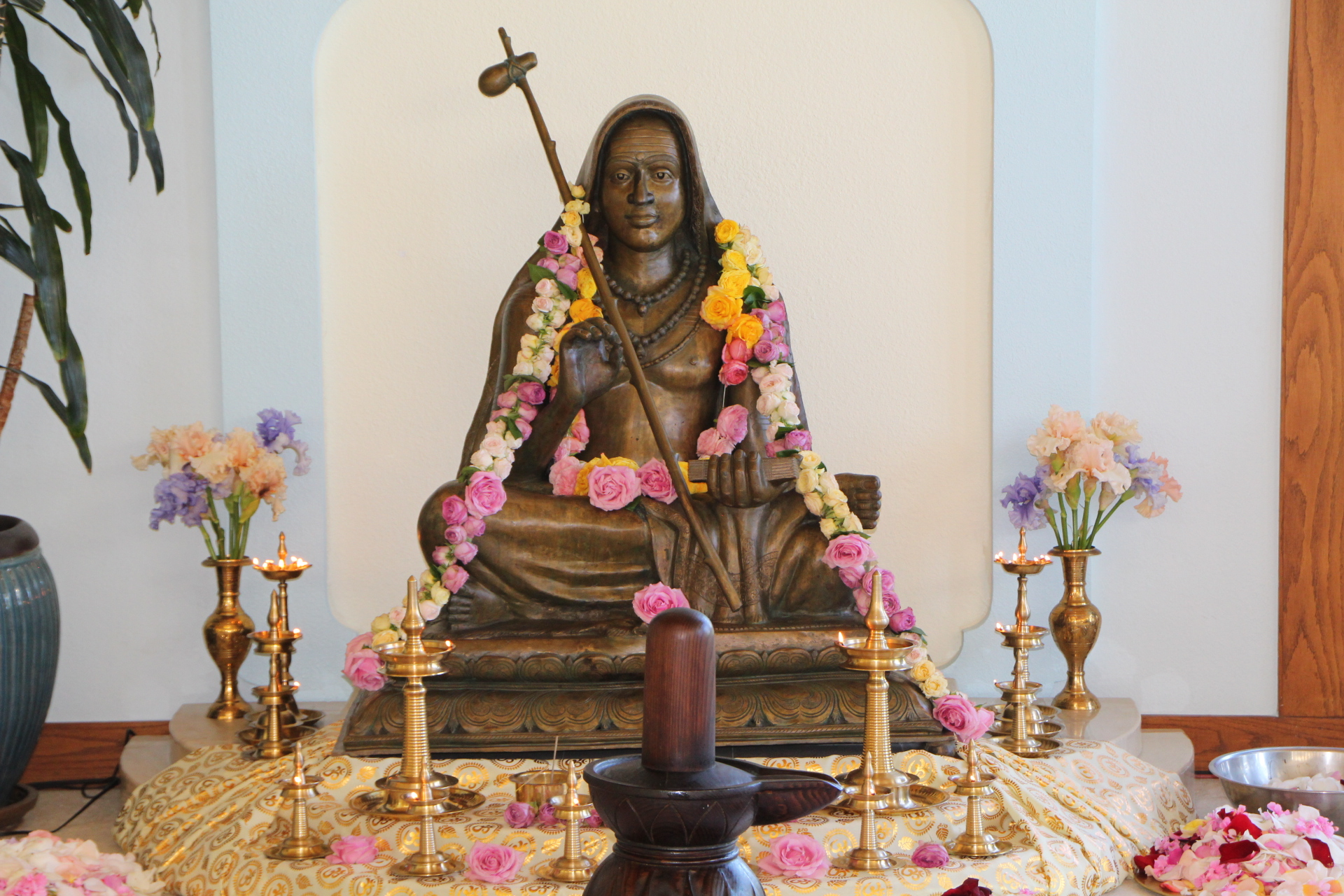
Murti of Shankara at the SAT Temple in Santa Cruz, California

Shankara is most known for his systematic reviews and commentaries (bhashyas) on ancient Indian texts. Shankara's masterpiece of commentary is the Brahmasutrabhashya (literally, commentary on Brahma Sutras). The Brahma Sutras are a fundamental text of the Vedanta school of Hinduism. Shankara refers to or cites some passages from works attributed to Gaudapada (the teacher of Shankara's teacher) in his commentaries, revealing a line of influence.

According to Flood, of the Upanishadic commentaries only his commentaries on the Brihadaranyaka Upanishad and the Taittiriya Upanishad are authentic. Hacker and Mayeda also accept as authentic the commentaries on the Chandogya Upanishad, the Aitareya Upanishad, the Kena Upanishad, (Note: Kena Upanishad has two commentaries that are attributed to Shankara – Kenopnishad Vakyabhasya and Kenopnishad Padabhasya; scholars contest whether both are authentic, several suggesting that the Vakyabhasya is unlikely to be authentic.) the Isha Upanishad, the Katha Upanishad, and the Prashna Upanishad. The authenticity of the commentary on the Mandukya Upanishad and Gaudapadas Madukya-karika has been questioned.

Other authentic works of Shankara include commentaries on the Bhagavad Gita (part of his Prasthana Trayi Bhasya). His Vivarana (tertiary notes) on the commentary by Vedavyasa on Yogasutras as well as those on Apastamba Dharma-sũtras (Adhyatama-patala-bhasya) are accepted by scholars as authentic works of Shankara. Among the Stotra (poetic works), the Dakshinamurti Stotra, the Mohamudgara Stotra(Bhaja govindam), the Shivanandalahari, the Carpata-panjarika, the Visnu-satpadi, the Harimide, the Dasha-shloki, and the Krishna-staka are likely to be authentic.

Shankara also authored Upadesasahasri, his most important original philosophical work. Of other original Prakaranas (प्रकरण, monographs, treatise), seventy-six works are attributed to Shankara. Modern era Indian scholars such as Belvalkar as well as Upadhyaya accept five and thirty-nine works respectively as authentic.

Shankara's stotras considered authentic include those dedicated to Krishna (Vaishnavism) and one to Shiva (Shaivism) – often considered two different sects within Hinduism. Scholars suggest that these stotra are not sectarian, but essentially Advaitic and reach for a unified universal view of Vedanta.

Shankara's commentary on the Brahma Sutras is the oldest surviving. However, in that commentary, he mentions older commentaries like those of Dravida, Bhartrprapancha and others which are either lost or yet to be found.

=== Works of doubtful authenticity or not authentic ===
Commentaries on Nrisimha-Purvatatapaniya and Shveshvatara Upanishads are attributed to Shankara, but their authenticity is highly doubtful. Similarly, commentaries on several early and later Upanishads attributed to Shankara are rejected by scholars to be his works, and are likely works of later scholars; these include: Kaushitaki Upanishad, Maitri Upanishad, Kaivalya Upanishad, Paramahamsa Upanishad, Sakatayana Upanishad, Mandala Brahmana Upanishad, Maha Narayana Upanishad, Gopalatapaniya Upanishad. However, in Brahmasutra-Bhasya, Shankara cites some of these Upanishads as he develops his arguments, but the historical notes left by his companions and disciples, along with major differences in style and the content of the commentaries on later Upanishad have led scholars to conclude that the commentaries on later Upanishads were not Shankara's work.

The authenticity of Shankara being the author of Vivekacūḍāmaṇi has been rejected by modern scholarship. (Note: See also IndiaDivine.org, Authorship of Vivekachudamani and arshabodha.org, Sri Sankara's Vivekachudamani, pp. 3–4, The Question of Authorship of Vivekachudamani) According to Grimes, "modern scholars tend to reject its authenticity as a work by Shankara," while "traditionalists tend to accept it." (Note: Nevertheless, Grimes argues that "there is still a likelihood that Śaṅkara is the author of the Vivekacūḍāmaṇi" (Grimes 2004, p. 23) noting that "it differs in certain respects from his other works in that it addresses itself to a different audience and has a different emphasis and purpose" (Grimes 2004, p. 13).)

The Aparokshanubhuti and Atma bodha are also attributed to Shankara, as his original philosophical treatises, but modern scholarship does not regard them to be composed by Shankara. (Note: With respect to both the Vivekacūḍāmaṇi and the Atma bodha, Shah-Kazemi, aiming to analyse "the doctrinal perspective associated with Shankara within Hinduism, [rather] than [...] the historical personage of that name" (Shah-Kazemi 2006, p. 1), argues that whilst modern scholars reject the attribution to Shankara, these two texts "are so closely woven into the spiritual heritage of Shankara' that without them an analysis of Shankara's philosophical perspective would be 'incomplete'" (Shah-Kazemi 2006, p. 4).)

Paul Hacker has also expressed some reservations that the compendium Sarva-darsana-siddhanta Sangraha was completely authored by Shankara, because of difference in style and thematic inconsistencies in parts. Similarly, Gayatri-bhasya is doubtful to be Shankara's work. Other commentaries that are highly unlikely to be Shankara's work include those on Uttaragita, Siva-gita, Brahma-gita, Lalita-shasranama, Suta-samhita and Sandhya-bhasya. The commentary on the Tantric work Lalita-trisati-bhasya attributed to Shankara is also unauthentic.

Shankara is widely credited with commentaries on other scriptural works, such as the Vishnu sahasranāma and the Sānatsujātiya, but both these are considered apocryphal by scholars who have expressed doubts. Hastamalakiya-bhasya is also widely believed in India to be Shankara's work and it is included in Samata-edition of Shankara's works, but some scholars consider it to be the work of Shankara's student.

== Philosophy and practice ==
Atma Shatakam (The song of the Self):

I am Consciousness, I am Bliss, I am Shiva, I am Shiva. (Note: Swami Vivekananda translates Shivoham, Shivoham as "I am he, I am he".)

Without hate, without infatuation, without craving, without greed;
Neither arrogance, nor conceit, never jealous I am;
Neither dharma, nor artha, neither kama, nor moksha am I;
I am Consciousness, I am Bliss, I am Shiva, I am Shiva.

Without sins, without merits, without elation, without sorrow;
Neither mantra, nor rituals, neither pilgrimage, nor Vedas;
Neither the experiencer, nor experienced, nor the experience am I,
I am Consciousness, I am Bliss, I am Shiva, I am Shiva.

Without fear, without death, without discrimination, without caste;
Neither father, nor mother, never born I am;
Neither kith, nor kin, neither teacher, nor student am I;
I am Consciousness, I am Bliss, I am Shiva, I am Shiva.

Without form, without figure, without resemblance am I;
Vitality of all senses, in everything I am;
Neither attached, nor released am I;
I am Consciousness, I am Bliss, I am Shiva, I am Shiva.

— Nirvana Shatakam, Hymns 3–6

According to Koller, Shankara, and his contemporaries, made a significant contribution in understanding Buddhism and the ancient Vedic traditions, then transforming the extant ideas, particularly reforming the Vedanta tradition of Hinduism, making it India's most important "spiritual tradition" for more than a thousand years. (Note: This includes also the dualistic Vaishna bhakti traditions, which have also commented on the Upanishads and the Brahma Sutras, but take a different stance.) Benedict Ashley credits Adi Shankara for unifying two seemingly disparate philosophical doctrines in Hinduism, namely Atman and Brahman.

According to Nakamura, Shankara was not an original thinker, but systematised the works of preceding philosophers. The central theme of Shankara's writings is the liberating knowledge of the true identity of the Self (jivĀtman) as Brahman. Moksha is attained in this life by recognizing this true identity, which is revealed by the Mahavakyas, especially Tat Tvam Asi, "That you are."

=== Historical context ===
Shankara lived in the time of the great "Late classical Hinduism", which lasted from 650 till 1100 CE. This era was one of political instability that followed the Gupta dynasty and King Harsha of the 7th century CE. Power became decentralised in India. Several larger kingdoms emerged, with "countless vassal states". (Note: Michaels (2004, p. 41): In the east the Pala Empire (770–1125 CE), in the west and north the Gurjara-Pratihara (7th–10th century), in the southwest the Rashtrakuta Dynasty (752–973), in the Dekkhan the Chalukya dynasty (7th–8th century), and in the south the Pallava dynasty (7th–9th century) and the Chola dynasty (9th century).) The kingdoms were ruled via a feudal system. Smaller kingdoms were dependent on the protection of the larger kingdoms. "The great king was remote, was exalted and deified", as reflected in the Tantric Mandala, which could also depict the king as the centre of the mandala.

The disintegration of central power also led to regionalisation of religiosity and religious rivalry. (Note: McRae (2003): This resembles the development of Chinese Chán during the An Lu-shan rebellion and the Five Dynasties and Ten Kingdoms Period (907–960/979), during which power became decentralised end new Chán-schools emerged.) Local cults and languages were enhanced, and the influence of "Brahmanic ritualistic Hinduism" was diminished. Rural and devotional movements arose, along with Shaivism, Vaisnavism, Bhakti and Tantra, though "sectarian groupings were only at the beginning of their development". Religious movements had to compete for recognition by the local lords, and Buddhism, Jainism, Islam and various traditions within Hinduism were competing for members. Buddhism in particular had emerged as a powerful influence in India's spiritual traditions in the first 700 years of the 1st millennium CE, but lost its position after the 8th century, and began to disappear in India. This was reflected in the change of puja-ceremonies at the courts in the 8th century, where Hindu gods replaced the Buddha as the "supreme, imperial deity". (Note: Inden (1998, p. 67): "Before the eighth century, the Buddha was accorded the position of universal deity and ceremonies by which a king attained to imperial status were elaborate donative ceremonies entailing gifts to Buddhist monks and the installation of a symbolic Buddha in a stupa ... This pattern changed in the eighth century. The Buddha was replaced as the supreme, imperial deity by one of the Hindu gods (except under the Palas of eastern India, the Buddha's homeland) ... Previously the Buddha had been accorded imperial-style worship (puja). Now as one of the Hindu gods replaced the Buddha at the imperial centre and pinnacle of the cosmo-political system, the image or symbol of the Hindu god comes to be housed in a monumental temple and given increasingly elaborate imperial-style puja worship.")

=== Systematizer of Advaita ===
According to Nakamura, comparison of the known teachings of the early Vedantins and Shankara's thought shows that most of the characteristics of Shankara's thought "were advocated by someone before Śankara". Shankara "was the person who synthesized the Advaita-vāda which had previously existed before him". According to Nakamura, after the growing influence of Buddhism on Vedānta, culminating in the works of Gauḍapāda, Adi Shankara gave a Vedantic character to the Buddhistic elements in these works, synthesising and rejuvenating the doctrine of Advaita.

According to Koller, using ideas in ancient Indian texts, Shankara systematized the foundation for Advaita Vedānta in the 8th century, reforming Badarayana's Vedānta tradition. According to Mayeda, Shankara represents a turning point in the development of Vedānta, yet he also notices that it is only since Deussens's praise that Shankara "has usually been regarded as the greatest philosopher of India." (Note: According to Isayeva (1993, pp. 4–5), Paul Deussen (1845–1919) laid the fundament for the study of Shankara in the west. In 1883 he published an overview of Shankara's teachings, and in 1887 a translation of Shankara's Brahmasutrabhasya. Thereafter studies by others followed.) Mayeda further notes that Shankara was primarily concerned with moksha, "and not with the establishment of a complete system of philosophy or theology," following Potter, who qualifies Shankara as a "speculative philosopher." Lipner notes that Shankara's "main literary approach was commentarial and hence perforce disjointed rather than procedurally systematic [...] though a systematic philosophy can be derived from Samkara's thought."

Shankara has been described as influenced by Shaivism and Shaktism, but his works and philosophy suggest greater overlap with Vaishnavism, influence of Yoga school of Hinduism, but most distinctly express his Advaitin convictions with a monistic view of spirituality, and his commentaries mark a turn from realism to idealism.

=== Moksha - liberating knowledge of Brahman ===
The central theme of Shankara's writings is the liberating knowledge of the true identity of jivatman (individual self) as Ātman-Brahman. (Note: Brahman is not to be confused with the personalised godhead Brahma.) One of Shankara's main concerns was establishing the Upanishads as an independent means of knowledge beyond the ritually oriented Mimansa exegesis of the vedas.

According to Shankara, the one unchanging entity (Brahman) alone is real, while changing entities do not have absolute existence. Shankara's primary objective was to explain how moksha is attained in this life by recognizing the true identity of jivatman as Atman-Brahman, as mediated by the Mahāvākyas, especially Tat Tvam Asi, "That you are." Correct knowledge of jivatman and Atman-Brahman is the attainment of Brahman, immortality, and leads to moksha (liberation) from suffering (Note: The suffering created by the workings of the mind entangled with physical reality) and samsara, the cycle of rebirth. This is stated by Shankara as follows:

I am other than name, form and action.
My nature is ever free!
I am Self, the supreme unconditioned Brahman.
I am pure Awareness, always non-dual.

— Adi Shankara, Upadesasahasri 11.7,

According to Joshua Anderson, liberation in Advaita Vedanta should be seen as 'psychological' rather than 'metaphysical'. That is to say, moksha is a 'shift in perspective' rather than 'an ontological change in being'. It alters how one experiences the phenomenal world rather than what one fundamentally is.

=== Pramanas - means of knowledge ===
Shankara recognized the means of knowledge, (Note: Mayeda refers to statements from Shankara regarding epistemology (pramana-janya) in section 1.18.133 of Upadesasahasri, and section 1.1.4 of Brahmasutra-bhasya. NB: some manuscripts list Upadesasahasri verse 1.18.133 as 2.18.133, while Mayeda lists it as 1.18.133, because of interchanged chapter numbering. See Upadesa Sahasri: A Thousand Teachings, S Jagadananda (Translator, 1949), ISBN 978-81-7120-059-7, Verse 2.8.133, p. 258; Karl H Potter (2014), The Encyclopedia of Indian Philosophies, Volume 3, Princeton University Press, ISBN 978-0-691-61486-1, p. 249) but his thematic focus was upon metaphysics and soteriology, and he took for granted the pramanas, that is epistemology or "means to gain knowledge, reasoning methods that empower one to gain reliable knowledge". According to Sengaku Mayeda, "in no place in his works [...] does he give any systematic account of them," taking Atman-Brahman to be self-evident (svapramanaka) and self-established (svatahsiddha), and "an investigation of the means of knowledge is of no use for the attainment of final release." Mayeda notes that Shankara's arguments are "strikingly realistic and not idealistic," arguing that jnana is based on existing things (vastutantra), and "not upon Vedic injunction (codanatantra) nor upon man (purusatantra).

According to Michael Comans (aka Vasudevacharya), Shankara considered perception and inference as a primary most reliable epistemic means, and where these means to knowledge help one gain "what is beneficial and to avoid what is harmful", there is no need for or wisdom in referring to the scriptures. In certain matters related to metaphysics and ethics, says Shankara, the testimony and wisdom in scriptures such as the Vedas and the Upanishads become important.

Merrell-Wolff states that Shankara accepts Vedas and Upanishads as a source of knowledge as he develops his philosophical theses, yet he never rests his case on the ancient texts, rather proves each thesis, point by point using the pramanas (means of knowledge) of reason and experience. Hacker and Phillips note that his insight into rules of reasoning and hierarchical emphasis on epistemic steps is "doubtlessly the suggestion" of Shankara in Brahma-sutra-bhasya, an insight that flowers in the works of his companion and disciple Padmapada.

==== Logic versus revelation ====
Stcherbatsky in 1927 criticized Shankara for demanding the use of logic from Madhyamika Buddhists, while himself resorting to revelation as a source of knowledge. (Note: Shcherbatsky 1927, pp. 44–45: "Shankara accuses them of disregarding all logic and refuses to enter in a controversy with them. The position of Shankara is interesting because, at heart, he is in full agreement with the Madhyamikas, at least in the main lines, since both maintain the reality of the One-without-a-second, and the mirage of the manifold. But Shankara, as an ardent hater of Buddhism, would never confess that. He therefore treats the Madhyamika with great contempt [...] on the charge that the Madhyamika denies the possibility of cognizing the Absolute by logical methods (pramana). Vachaspati Mishra in the Bhamati rightly interprets this point as referring to the opinion of the Madhyamikas that logic is incapable to solve the question about what existence or non-existence really are. This opinion Shankara himself, as is well known, shares. He does not accept the authority of logic as a means of cognizing the Absolute, but he deems it a privilege of the Vedantin to fare without logic, since he has Revelation to fall back upon. From all his opponents, he requires strict logical methods.") Sircar in 1933 offered a different perspective and stated, "Sankara recognizes the value of the law of contrariety and self-alienation from the standpoint of idealistic logic; and it has consequently been possible for him to integrate appearance with reality."

Recent scholarship states that Shankara's arguments on revelation are about apta vacana (Sanskrit: आप्तवचन, sayings of the wise, relying on word, testimony of past or present reliable experts). It is part of his and Advaita Vedanta's epistemological foundation. The Advaita Vedanta tradition considers such testimony epistemically valid, asserting that a human being needs to know numerous facts, and with the limited time and energy available, he can learn only a fraction of those facts and truths directly. Shankara considered the teachings in the Vedas and Upanishads as apta vacana and a valid source of knowledge. He suggests the importance of teacher-disciple relationship on combining logic and revelation to attain moksha in his text Upadeshasahasri. Anantanand Rambachan and others state that Shankara did not rely exclusively on Vedic statements, but also used a range of logical methods and reasoning methodology and other pramanas.

==== Anubhava ====
Anantanand Rambachan summarizes the widely held view on the role of anubhava in Shankara's epistemology as follows, before critiquing it:

According to these [widely represented contemporary] studies, Shankara only accorded a provisional validity to the knowledge gained by inquiry into the words of the Śruti (Vedas) and did not see the latter as the unique source (pramana) of Brahmajnana. The affirmations of the Śruti, it is argued, need to be verified and confirmed by the knowledge gained through direct experience (anubhava) and the authority of the Śruti, therefore, is only secondary.

==== Yoga and contemplative exercises ====
Shankara considered the purity and steadiness of mind achieved in Yoga as an aid to gaining moksha knowledge, but such yogic state of mind cannot in itself give rise to such knowledge. To Shankara, that knowledge of Brahman springs only from inquiry into the teachings of the Upanishads. The method of yoga, encouraged in Shankara's teachings notes Comans, includes withdrawal of mind from sense objects as in Patanjali's system, but it is not complete thought suppression, instead it is a "meditative exercise of withdrawal from the particular and identification with the universal, leading to contemplation of oneself as the most universal, namely, Consciousness". Describing Shankara's style of yogic practice, Comans writes:

the type of yoga which Sankara presents here is a method of merging, as it were, the particular (visesa) into the general (samanya). For example, diverse sounds are merged in the sense of hearing, which has greater generality insofar as the sense of hearing is the locus of all sounds. The sense of hearing is merged into the mind, whose nature consists of thinking about things, and the mind is in turn merged into the intellect, which Sankara then says is made into 'mere cognition' (vijnanamatra); that is, all particular cognitions resolve into their universal, which is cognition as such, thought without any particular object. And that in turn is merged into its universal, mere Consciousness (prajnafnaghana), upon which everything previously referred to ultimately depends.

Shankara rejected those yoga system variations that suggest complete thought suppression leads to liberation, as well the view that the Shrutis teach liberation as something apart from the knowledge of the oneness of the Self. Knowledge alone and insights relating to true nature of things, taught Shankara, is what liberates. He placed great emphasis on the study of the Upanisads, emphasizing them as necessary and sufficient means to gain Self-liberating knowledge. Sankara also emphasized the need for and the role of Guru (Acharya, teacher) for such knowledge.

==== Samanvayat Tatparya Linga ====
Shankara cautioned against cherrypicking a phrase or verse out of context from Vedic literature, and remarks in the opening chapter of his Brahmasutra-Bhasya that the Anvaya (theme or purport) of any treatise can only be correctly understood if one attends to the Samanvayat Tatparya Linga, that is six characteristics of the text under consideration: (1) the common in Upakrama (introductory statement) and Upasamhara (conclusions); (2) Abhyasa (message repeated); (3) Apurvata (unique proposition or novelty); (4) Phala (fruit or result derived); (5) Arthavada (explained meaning, praised point) and (6) Yukti (verifiable reasoning). While this methodology has roots in the theoretical works of Nyaya school of Hinduism, Shankara consolidated and applied it with his unique exegetical method called Anvaya-Vyatireka, which states that for proper understanding one must "accept only meanings that are compatible with all characteristics" and "exclude meanings that are incompatible with any".

=== The Mahāvākyas - true identity as Ātman-Brahman ===
Moksha, liberation from suffering and rebirth and attaining immortality, is attained by disidentification from the body-mind complex and gaining self-knowledge as being in essence Atman-Brahman. According to Shankara, the individual jivĀtman and Brahman seem different at the empirical level of reality, but this difference is only an illusion, and at the highest level of reality they are really identical. The real self is Sat, "the Existent," that is, Ātman-Brahman. (Note: Highest self: Shankara, Upadesasahasri I.18.3: "I am ever-free, the existent" (Sat). I.18.6: "The two [contradictory] notions "I am the Existent-Brahman" and "I act," have Atman as their witness. It is considered more reasonable to give up only [that one] of the two [notions] which arises from ignorance. I.18.7: "The notion, "I am the Existent," arises from right means of knowledge [while] the other notion has its origin in fallacious means of knowledge."; Sivananda 1993, p. 219: "Brahman (the Absolute) is alone real; this world is unreal; and the Jiva or individual soul is non-different from Brahman."; Deutsch 1973, p. 54: "[the] essential status [of the individual human person] is that of unqualified reality, of identity with the Absolute [...] the self (jiva) is only misperceived: the self is really Brahman."; Koller 2013, pp. 100–101: "Atman, which is identical to Brahman, is ultimately the only reality and [...] the appearance of plurality is entirely the work of ignorance [...] the self is ultimately of the nature of Atman/Brahman [...] Brahman alone is ultimately real."; Bowker 2000: "There is only Brahman, which is necessarily undifferentiated. It follows that there cannot even be a difference, or duality, between the human subject, or self, and Brahman, for Brahman must be that very self (since Brahman is the reality underlying all appearance). The goal of human life and wisdom must, therefore, be the realization that the self (ātman) is Brahman."; Menon 2012: "The experiencing self (jīva) and the transcendental self of the Universe (ātman) are in reality identical (both are Brahman), though the individual self seems different as space within a container seems different from space as such. These cardinal doctrines are represented in the anonymous verse "brahma satyam jagan mithya; jīvo brahmaiva na aparah" (Brahman is alone True, and this world of plurality is an error; the individual self is not different from Brahman)."; Hacker (1995, p. 88) notes that Shankara uses two groups of words to denote 'atman': "One group - principally jiva, vijnanatman, and sarira - expresses the illusory aspect of the soul [...] But in addition there are the two expressions atman and pratyagatman. These also designate the individual soul, but in its real aspect." Mayeda (1992, pp. 11, 14) uses the word pratyagatman; Sivananda (1993, p. 219), Deutsch (1973, p. 54), and Menon (2012) use the term jiva when referring to the identity of atman and Brahman.) Whereas the difference between Ātman and non-Ātman is deemed self-evident, knowledge of the true identity of jivĀtman as Brahman is revealed by the shruti, especially the Upanishadic statement tat tvam asi.

==== Mahāvākyas ====
According to Shankara, a large number of Upanishadic statements reveal the true identity of jivĀtman as Brahman. In the Advaita Vedānta tradition, four of those statements, the Mahāvākyas, which are taken literal, in contrast to other statements, have a special importance in revealing this identity. They are:

- तत्त्वमसि, tat tvam asi, Chandogya VI.8.7. Traditionally rendered as "That Thou Art" (that you are), with tat in Ch.U.6.8.7 referring to sat, "the Existent"); correctly translated as "That's how [thus] you are," with tat in Ch.U.6.12.3, it' original location from where it was copied to other verses, referring to "the very nature of all existence as permeated by [the finest essence]"
- अहं ब्रह्मास्मि, aham brahmāsmi, Brhadāranyaka I.4.10, "I am Brahman," or "I am Divine."
- प्रज्ञानं ब्रह्म, prajñānam brahma, Aitareya V.3, "Prajñānam (Note: "Consciousness", "intelligence", "wisdom") is Brahman." (Note: "the Absolute", "infinite", "the Highest truth")
- अयमात्मा ब्रह्म, ayamātmā brahma, Mandukya II, "This Atman is Brahman."

==== That you are ====
The longest chapter of Shankara's Upadesasahasri, chapter 18, "That Art Thou," is devoted to considerations on the insight "I am ever-free, the existent" (sat), and the identity expressed in Chandogya Upanishad 6.8.7 in the mahavakya (great sentence) "tat tvam asi", "that thou art." In this statement, according to Shankara, tat refers to Sat, "the Existent" Existence, Being, or Brahman, the Real, the "Root of the world," (Note: While the Vedanta tradition equates sat ("the Existent") with Brahman, the Chandogya Upanishad itself does not refer to Brahman. Deutsch & Dalvi (2004, p. 8): "Although the text does not use the term brahman, the Vedanta tradition is that the Existent (sat) referred to is no other than Brahman.") the true essence or root or origin of everything that exists. "Tvam" refers to one's real I, pratyagatman or inner Self, the "direct Witness within everything", the essence, Atman, which the individual at the core is. Shankara adds in another verse of the Upadesasahasri that the inner Self is "free from caste, family, and purifying ceremonies." As Shankara states in the Upadesasahasri:

Up.I.174: "Through such sentences as "Thou art That" one knows one's own Atman, the Witness of all the internal organs." Up.I.18.190: "Through such sentences as "[Thou art] the Existent" [...] right knowledge concerning the inner Atman will become clearer." Up.I.18.193-194: "In the sentence "Thou art That" [...] [t]he word "That" means inner Atman."

The statement "tat tvam asi" sheds the false notion that Atman is different from Brahman. According to Nakamura, the non-duality of atman and Brahman "is a famous characteristic of Sankara's thought, but it was already taught by Sundarapandya" (c. 600 CE or earlier). Shankara cites Sundarapandya in his comments to Brahma Sutra verse I.1.4:

When the metaphorical or false atman is non-existent, [the ideas of my] child, [my] body are sublated. Therefore, when it is realized that 'I am the existent Brahman, atman', how can anyduty exist?

From this, and a large number of other accordances, Nakamura concludes that Shankar was not an original thinker, but "a synthesizer of existing Advaita and the rejuvenator, as well as a defender, of ancient learning."

==== Meditation on the Mahāvākya ====
In the Upadesasahasri Shankara, Shankara is ambivalent on the need for meditation on the Upanishadic mahavyaka. He states that "right knowledge arises at the moment of hearing," and rejects prasamcaksa or prasamkhyana meditation, that is, meditation on the meaning of the sentences, and in Up.II.3 recommends parisamkhyana, separating Atman from everything that is not Atman, that is, the sense-objects and sense-organs, and the pleasant and unpleasant things and merit and demerit connected with them. Yet, Shankara then concludes with declaring that only Atman exists, stating that "all the sentences of the Upanishads concerning non-duality of Atman should be fully contemplated, should be contemplated." As Mayeda states, "how they [prasamcaksa or prasamkhyana versus parisamkhyana] differ from each other is not known."

Prasamkhyana was advocated by Mandana Misra, the older contemporary of Shankara. "According to Mandana, the mahavakyas are incapable, by themselves, of bringing about brahmajnana. The Vedanta-vakyas convey an indirect knowledge which is made direct only by deep meditation (prasamkhyana). The latter is a continuous contemplation of the purport of the mahavakyas. Vācaspati Miśra, a student of Mandana Misra, agreed with Mandana Misra, and their stance is defended by the Bhamati-school, founded by Vācaspati Miśra. In contrast, the Vivarana school founded by Prakasatman (c. 1200–1300) follows Shankara closely, arguing that the mahavakyas are the direct cause of gaining knowledge.

==== Renouncement of ritualism ====
Shankara, in his text Upadesasahasri, discourages ritual worship such as oblations to Deva (God), because that assumes the Self within is different from the Brahman. The "doctrine of difference" is wrong, asserts Shankara, because, "he who knows the Brahman is one and he is another, does not know Brahman". The false notion that Atman is different from Brahman is connected with the novice's conviction that (Upadeshasahasri II.1.25)

...I am one [and] He is another; I am ignorant, experience pleasure and pain, am bound and a transmigrator [whereas] he is essentially different from me, the god not subject to transmigration. By worshipping Him with oblation, offerings, homage and the like through the [performance of] the actions prescribed for [my] class and stage of life, I wish to get out of the ocean of transmigratory existence. How am I he?

Recognizing oneself as "the Existent-Brahman," which is mediated by scriptural teachings, is contrasted with the notion of "I act," which is mediated by relying on sense-perception and the like. According to Shankara, the statement "Thou art That" "remove[s] the delusion of a hearer," "so through sentences as "Thou art That" one knows one's own Atman, the witness of all internal organs," and not from any actions. (Note: Up.I.18.219: "The renunciation of all actions becomes the means for discriminating the meaning of the word "Thou" since there is an [Upanisadic] teaching, "Having become calm, self-controlled [..., one sees Atman there in oneself]" (Bhr. Up. IV, 4, 23).") With this realization, the performance of rituals is prohibited, "since [the use of] rituals and their requisites is contradictory to the realization of the identity [of Atman] with the highest Atman."

However, Shankara also asserts that Self-knowledge is realized when one's mind is purified by an ethical life that observes Yamas such as Ahimsa (non-injury, non-violence to others in body, mind and thoughts) and Niyamas. Rituals and rites such as yajna (a fire ritual), asserts Shankara, can help draw and prepare the mind for the journey to Self-knowledge. He emphasizes the need for ethics such as Akrodha and Yamas during Brahmacharya, stating the lack of ethics as causes that prevent students from attaining knowledge.

=== Īśvara ===
Shankara, while rejecting empirical reality due to his position of nonduality, still attributes value to the universe as it identifies with Īśvara. He sometimes blurs the distinction between Īśvara and Brahman, using various terms for both. However, he generally separates Īśvara, associated with the universe and its attributes, from the absolute nondual Brahman. In his commentary on the Brahmasutra, Shankara uses the term Īśvara or Parameśvara (highest Īśvara) to refer to absolute Brahman. Drawing from the Upanishads, Shankara sees Īśvara as the universe's material and intelligent cause, emanating it through the power of maya, thereby making the universe sentient and self-aware. In relation to the Mandukya Upanishad, Shankara compares the universe's unmanifest state to Īśvara in a deep dreamless cosmic state.

Shankara's conception of Brahman as the cause of the world does not invoke creation in the literal sense but vivartta (manifoldness without transformation), distinct from satkaryavada (actual transformation). Shankara argues that insentient matter cannot act purposefully and rejects any actual transformation of Brahman.

== Influences of Mahayana Buddhism ==
Shankara's Vedanta shows similarities with Mahayana Buddhism; opponents have even accused Shankara of being a "crypto-Buddhist," a qualification which is rejected by the Advaita Vedanta tradition, given the differences between these two schools. According to Shankara, a major difference between Advaita and Mahayana Buddhism are their views on Atman and Brahman. According to both Loy and Jayatilleke, more differences can be discerned. Suthren Hirst and others have also noted that Shankara's advaita may stem from a Vaishnavite Advaita tradition.

=== Similarities and influences ===
Despite Shankara's criticism of certain schools of Mahayana Buddhism, Shankara's philosophy shows strong similarities with the Mahayana Buddhist philosophy which he attacks. According to S.N. Dasgupta,

Shankara and his followers borrowed much of their dialectic form of criticism from the Buddhists. His Brahman was very much like the sunya of Nagarjuna [...] The debts of Shankara to the self-luminosity of the Vijnanavada Buddhism can hardly be overestimated. There seems to be much truth in the accusations against Shankara by Vijnana Bhiksu and others that he was a hidden Buddhist himself. I am led to think that Shankara's philosophy is largely a compound of Vijnanavada and Sunyavada Buddhism with the Upanisad notion of the permanence of self superadded.

According to Mudgal, Shankara's Advaita and the Buddhist Madhyamaka view of ultimate reality are compatible because they are both transcendental, indescribable, non-dual and only arrived at through a via negativa (neti neti). Mudgal concludes therefore that

... the difference between Sunyavada (Mahayana) philosophy of Buddhism and Advaita philosophy of Hinduism may be a matter of emphasis, not of kind.

Some Hindu scholars criticized Advaita for its Maya and non-theistic doctrinal similarities with Buddhism. Ramanuja, the founder of Vishishtadvaita Vedānta, accused Adi Shankara of being a Prachanna Bauddha, that is, a "crypto-Buddhist", and someone who was undermining theistic Bhakti devotionalism. The non-Advaita scholar Bhaskara of the Bhedabheda Vedānta tradition, similarly around 800 CE, accused Shankara's Advaita as "this despicable broken down Mayavada that has been chanted by the Mahayana Buddhists", and a school that is undermining the ritual duties set in Vedic orthodoxy.

=== Differences ===
The qualification of "crypto-Buddhist" is rejected by the Advaita Vedanta tradition, highlighting their respective views on Atman, Anatta and Brahman. There are differences in the conceptual means of "liberation." Nirvana, a term more often used in Buddhism, is the liberating 'blowing out' of craving, aided by the realization and acceptance that there is no Self (anatman) as the center of perception, craving, and delusion. Moksha, a term more common in Hinduism, is the similar liberating release from craving and ignorance, yet aided by the realization and acceptance that one's inner Self is not a personal 'ego-self', but a Universal Self.

== Films ==
- Shankaracharya (1927), Indian silent film about Shankara by Kali Prasad Ghosh.
- Jagadguru Shrimad Shankaracharya (1928), Indian silent film by Parshwanath Yeshwant Altekar.
- Jagadguru Shankaracharya (1955), Indian Hindi film by Sheikh Fattelal.
- In 1977 Jagadguru Aadisankaran, a Malayalam film directed by P. Bhaskaran was released in which Murali Mohan plays the role of Adult Aadi Sankaran and Master Raghu plays childhood.
- In 1983 a film directed by G.V. Iyer named Adi Shankaracharya was premiered, the first film ever made entirely in Sanskrit language in which all of Adi Shankaracharya's works were compiled. The movie received the Indian National Film Awards for Best Film, Best Screenplay, Best Cinematography and Best Audiography.
- On 15 August 2013, Jagadguru Adi Shankara was released in an Indian Telugu-language biographical film written and directed by J. K. Bharavi and was later dubbed in Kannada with the same title, by Upendra giving narration for the Kannada dubbed version

== See also ==
- Dakshinamurti Stotra
- Dwarka Kalika Pitha (West), Dwarka, Gujarat
- Adi Shri Gauḍapādāchārya
- Govardhan Peetham (East), Puri, Odisha
- Shri Govinda Bhagavatpadacharya
- Jnana Yoga
- Jyotirmath Peetham (North), Jyotirmath, Badrikashram, Uttarakhand
- Shri Kanchi Kamakoti Peetham, Kanchipuram, Tamil Nadu
- Pātañjalayogaśāstravivaraṇa
- Śānkarasmṛti (Laghudharmaprakrāśikā)
- Shivananda Lahari
- Shri Gaudapadacharya Math
- Soundarya Lahari
- Shri Sringeri Sharada Peetham (South), Sringeri, Karnataka
- Swami Vivekananda
- Vairagya
- Vivekachudamani
- Eka shloki

== Sources ==
Printed sources

- Allen, Charles (2017). Coromandel: A Personal History of South India. Little, Brown Book Group. ISBN 978-1-4087-0540-7.
- Ambade, Dhiraj B. (2025). "Glorifying my gods: cultural politics of statue making, Hindu symbolism, and power iconography". Cultural Trends. 34 (5): 722–738. doi:10.1080/09548963.2024.2436569.
- Bader, Jonathan (2001), Conquest of the Four Quarters. TYraditional Accounts of the Life of Shankara, Australian National University
- Bhatawadekar, Sai (2013), "The Tvat Tam Asi Formula and Schopenhauer's 'Deductive Leap'", in Fuechtner, Veronika; Rhiel, Mary (eds.), Imagining Germany Imagining Asia: Essays in Asian-German Studies, Boydell & Brewer
- Biderman, Shlomo (1978). "Śankara and the Buddhists". Journal of Indian Philosophy. 6 (4). doi:10.1007/BF00218430. S2CID 170754201.
- Black, Brian (2012), The Character of the Self in Ancient India: Priests, Kings, and Women in the Early Upanisads, SUNY, ISBN 9780791480526
- Blake Michael, R. (1992), The Origins of Vīraśaiva Sects, Motilal Banarsidass, ISBN 978-81-208-0776-1
- Bowker, John (2000), "Advaita Vedanta", The Concise Oxford Dictionary of World Religions, Oxford University Press
- Braue, Donald A. (1984), Māyā in Radhakrishnanʾs Thought: Six Meanings Other Than Illusion, Motilall Banarsidass
- Brereton, Joel P. (1986), "'Tat Tvam Ast' in Context", Zeitschrift der Deutschen Morgenländischen Gesellschaft, 136 (1): 98–109
- Cenkner, William (1995), A Tradition of Teachers: Śaṅkara and the Jagadgurus Today, Motilall Banarsidas
- Chattopadhyaya, Shyama Kumar (2000). The Philosophy of Sankar's Advaita Vedanta. New Delhi: Sarup & Sons. ISBN 81-7625-222-0.
- Clark, Matthew (2006), The Daśanāmī-saṃnyāsīs. The Integration Of Ascetic Lineages Into An Order, BRILL
- Comans, Michael (2000), The Method of Early Advaita Vedānta: A Study of Gauḍapāda, Śaṅkara, Sureśvara, and Padmapāda, Delhi: Motilal Banarsidass
- Dasgupta, S. N. (1997). History of Indian Philosophy. Vol. 1.
- Deutsch, Eliot (1973), Advaita Vedanta: A Philosophical Reconstruction, University of Hawaii Press, ISBN 978-0-8248-0271-4
- Deutsch, Eliot; Dalvi, Rohit (2004), The Essential Vedanta: A New Source Book of Advaita Vedanta, World Wisdom, Inc., ISBN 9780941532525
- Doniger, Wendy (1999). Merriam-Webster's Encyclopedia of World Religions. Merriam-Webster. p. 1017. ISBN 978-0-87779-044-0. "smarta sect."
- Feuerstein, Georg (1978). Handboek voor Yoga (Dutch translation; English title "Textbook of Yoga"). Ankh-Hermes.
- Goodding, Robert A. (2013), "A Theologian in a South Indian Kingdom: The Historical Context of the Jivanmuktiviveka of Vidyaranya", in Lindquist, Steven E. (ed.), Religion and Identity in South Asia and Beyond: Essays in Honor of Patrick Olivelle, Anthem Press
- Grimes, John A. (1996), A Concise Dictionary of Indian Philosophy: Sanskrit Terms Defined in English, SUNY Press, ISBN 978-0-7914-3067-5
- Grimes, John (2004), "Introduction", The Vivekacudamani of Sankaracarya Bhagavatpada: An Introduction and Translation, Ashgate, ISBN 978-0-7546-3395-2
- Hacker, Paul (1995), Halbfass, Wilhelm (ed.), Philology and Confrontation: Paul Hacker on Traditional and Modern Vedanta, SUNY Press, ISBN 978-0-7914-2582-4
- Halbfass, W (1983). Studies in Kumarila and Sankara, Studien zur Indologie und Iranistik, Monographic 9. Reinbeck.
- Halbfass, Wilhelm (1990). Tradition and Reflection: Explorations in Indian Thought. State University of New York Press. ISBN 978-0-7914-0362-4.
- Hiltebeitel, Alf (2002), Hinduism. In: Joseph Kitagawa, "The Religious Traditions of Asia: Religion, History, and Culture", Routledge, ISBN 978-1-136-87597-7
- Inden, Ronald (1998), "Ritual, Authority, And Cycle Time in Hindu Kingship", in J.F. Richards (ed.), Kingship and Authority in South Asia, New Delhi: Oxford University Press
- Isaeva, Natalia (1993). Shankara and Indian Philosophy. Albany: State University of New York Press (SUNY). ISBN 978-0-7914-1281-7. Some editions spell the author Isayeva.
- Isayeva, Natalia (1993). Shankara and Indian Philosophy. Albany: State University of New York Press (SUNY). ISBN 978-0-7914-1282-4.
- Jain, Kajri (2021). Gods in the Time of Democracy. Duke University Press.
- Javanaud, Katie (2013). "Is The Buddhist 'No-Self' Doctrine Compatible With Pursuing Nirvana?". Philosophy Now.
- Kakvi, Kashif (2022). "MP: Locals, Seers Oppose Making Adi Shankaracharya Statue at Sacred Site". NewsClick.
- Keshava Menon, Y. (1976). The Mind of Adi Shankaracharya.
- King, Richard (1995), Early Advaita Vedanta and Buddhism: The Mahayana Context of the Gaudapadiya-Karika, SUNY Press
- King, Richard (1999). Orientalism and Religion: Post-Colonial Theory, India and 'The Mystic East'. London; New York: Routledge. OCLC 1120551977. ISBN 9780415202589, 9780415202572
- King, Richard (2001). Orientalism and Religion: Post-Colonial Theory, India and 'The Mystic East'. Taylor & Francis e-Library.
- King, Richard (2002). Orientalism and Religion: Post-Colonial Theory, India and 'The Mystic East'. London: Routledge. OCLC 248920425. ISBN 9780415202572, 9780415202589
- Klostermaier, Klaus (2007). A Survey of Hinduism, Third Edition. State University of New York Press. ISBN 978-0-7914-7082-4.
- Koller, John (2007). "Shankara". In Meister, Chad; Copan, Paul (eds.). The Routledge Companion to Philosophy of Religion. Routledge. ISBN 978-1-134-18001-1.
- Koller, John (2012), "Shankara", in Meister, Chad; Copan, Paul (eds.), Routledge Companion to Philosophy of Religion, Routledge, ISBN 978-0-415-78294-4
- Koller, John M. (2013), "Shankara", in Meister, Chad; Copan, Paul (eds.), Routledge Companion to Philosophy of Religion, Routledge
- Krishna, Nanditha (2006). Kanchipuram: a heritage of art and religion. Aiyar Foundation. ISBN 978-81-901484-1-2.
- Kruijf, Johannes de; Sahoo, Ajaya (2014), Indian Transnationalism Online: New Perspectives on Diaspora, Ashgate Publishing, ISBN 978-1-4724-1913-2
- Kulke, Hermann; Rothermund, Dietmar (1998), A History of India, Routledge
- Lipner, Julius (2000), "The Self of Being and the Being of Self: Samkara on "That You Are" (Tat Tvam Asi)", in Malkovsky, Bradley J. (ed.), New Perspectives on Advaita Vedānta, BRILL
- Mayeda, Sengaku (1992), "An Introduction to the Life and Thought of Sankara", in Mayeda, Sengaku (ed.), A Thousand Teachings: The Upadeśasāhasrī of Śaṅkara, State University of New York City Press, ISBN 0-7914-0944-9
- Mayeda, Sengaku (2006). A thousand teachings : the Upadeśasāhasrī of Śaṅkara. Motilal Banarsidass. ISBN 978-81-208-2771-4.
- Mayeda, Sengaku (2015). "Adi Shankara". Encyclopedia Britannica.
- McRae, John (2003), Seeing Through Zen. Encounter, Transformation, and Genealogy in Chinese Chan Buddhism, The University Press Group Ltd, ISBN 978-0-520-23798-8
- Menon, Sangeetha (2012), Advaita Vedanta, Internet Encyclopedia of Philosophy
- Michaels, Axel (2004). Hinduism. Past and present. Princeton, New Jersey: Princeton University Press.
- Mohan J, Anand (21 September 2023). "Madhya Pradesh CM unveils Adi Shankaracharya statue at Omkareshwar: Its story, significance". The Indian Express.
- Mohan J, Anand (2022b). "Madhya Pradesh CM unveils 108-ft statue of Adi Shankaracharya in Omkareshwar". The Indian Express.
- Mookerji, R. (2011) [1947], Ancient Indian Education: Brahmanical and Buddhist, Motilal Banarsidass Publishers, ISBN 978-81-208-0423-4
- Arun Murthi, S.K. (2025). "Opinion: How scholarship on Adi Shankaracharya ignores his sectarian views". The News Minute.
- Nakamura, Hajime (1999), Indian Buddhism: A Survey with Bibliographical Notes, Delhi: Motilal Banarsidass
- Nakamura, Hajime (2004) [1950], A History of Early Vedanta Philosophy. Part Two, Delhi: Motilal Banarsidass Publishers (Reprint of Shoki No Vedanta Tetsugaku, Iwanami Shoten, Tokyo)
- Nelson, Lance (2007). "Krishna in Advaita Vedanta: The Supreme Brahman in Human Form". In Bryant, Edwin (ed.). Krishna - A Sourcebook. Oxford University Press.
- Nicholson, Andrew J. (2010), Unifying Hinduism: Philosophy and Identity in Indian Intellectual History, Columbia University Press
- Nowicka, Olga (2016), "Conquering the World, Subduing the Minds: Śaṅkara's digvijaya in the Local Context", Cracow Indological Studies, XVIII (18): 145–166, doi:10.12797/CIS.18.2016.18.07
- Olivelle, Patrick (1998), Upaniṣads, Oxford University Press, ISBN 978-0-19-283576-5
- Olivelle, Patrick (2008), Upaniṣads, Oxford University Press, ISBN 978-0-19-954025-9
- Outlook News Desk (2022). "From Sages To Politicians, Why We Love Building Statues Of Prominent Figures". Outlook India.
- Pande, G. C. (2011). Life and Thought of Śaṅkarācārya. Motilal Banarsidass. ISBN 978-81-208-1104-1.
- Pattanaik, Devdutt (2020). "Who is a Hindu? - What they don't tell you about Advaita". Mumbai Mirror.
- Pattanaik, Devdutt (2024). "What do we really know about Adi Shankaracharya?". Deccan Herald.
- Popular Prakashan (2000). Students' Britannica India, Volumes 1–5. Popular Prakashan. ISBN 978-0-85229-760-5.
- Potter, Karl (2006), Encyclopedia of Indian Philosophies Vol. II: Advaita Vedanta From 800 To 1200, Motilal Banarsidass Publishers, ISBN 81-208-3061-X
- Potter, Karl (2008), Encyclopedia of Indian Philosophies Vol. III: Advaita Vedānta up to Śaṃkara and his pupils, Motilal Banarsidass Publishers, ISBN 978-81-208-0310-7
- Prasad, Indulata (2019). "Why giant statues of Hindu gods and leaders are making Muslims in India nervous". The Conversation.
- Puniyani, Ram (2016). "Adi Shankaracharya's philosophy shaped the BJP brand of politics". Forward Press.
- Raju, P. T. (1 January 1985). Structural Depths of Indian Thought. SUNY Press. p. 383. ISBN 978-0-88706-139-4.
- Rambachan, Anantanand (1991). Accomplishing the Accomplished: The Vedas as a Source of Valid Knowledge in Sankara. University of Hawaii Press. ISBN 978-0-8248-1358-1.
- Rambachan, Anantanand (2006), The Advaita Worldview: God, World, and Humanity, State University of New York Press, ISBN 978-0791468524
- Roodurmun, Pulasth Soobah (2002). Bhāmatī and Vivaraṇa Schools of Advaita Vedānta: A Critical Approach. Delhi: Motilal Banarsidass Publishers.
- Rosen, Steven (2006), Essential Hinduism, Greenwood Publishing Group, ISBN 978-0-275-99006-0
- Satchidanandendra Sarasvati (1997), The Method of the Vedanta. A Critical Account of the Advaita Tradition, Motilall Banarsidass
- Scheepers, Alfred (2000). De Wortels van het Indiase Denken. Olive Press.
- Shcherbatsky, Fyodor (1927). The Conception of Buddhist Nirvana. Motilal Banarsidass Publ. ISBN 9788120805293.
- Shah-Kazemi, Reza (2006). Paths to Transcendence: According to Shankara, Ibn Arabi & Meister Eckhart. World Wisdom.
- Shaji, K. A. (2022). "PM Modi and the Sangh Parivar agenda to appropriate the Adi Shankara legacy". SouthFirst.
- Sharma, C. (1997). A Critical Survey of Indian Philosophy. Motilal Banarsidass. ISBN 978-81-208-0365-7.
- Sharma, B.N. Krishnamurti (2000). History of the Dvaita School of Vedānta and Its Literature: From the Earliest Beginnings to Our Own Times. Motilal Banarsidass Publishers. ISBN 978-81-208-1575-9.
- Singh, Kautilya (6 November 2021). "PM Modi unveils Adi Guru Shankaracharya statue at Kedarnath". The Times of India.
- Sivananda, Swami (1993), All About Hinduism, The Divine Life Society
- Sivaraman, K. (1973), Śaivism in Philosophical Perspective: A Study of the Formative Concepts, Problems, and Methods of Śaiva Siddhānta, Motilall Banarsidass
- Stoker, Valerie (2016), Polemics and Patronage in the City of Victory: Vyasatirtha, Hindu Sectarianism, and the Sixteenth-Century Vijayanagara Court, University of California Press
- Sundaresan, Vidyasankar (2000). "Conflicting hagiographies and history: The place of Śaṅkaravijaya texts in Advaita tradition" (PDF). International Journal of Hindu Studies. 4 (2). Springer: 109–184. doi:10.1007/s11407-000-0004-7.
- Suthren Hirst, J. G. (2005), Śaṃkara's Advaita Vedānta: A Way of Teaching, Routledge, ISBN 978-1-134-25441-5
- Tapasyananda (2015). Sankara Digvijaya – The traditional life of Sri Sankaracharya. Sri Ramakrishna Math. ISBN 978-81-7823-342-0.
- TNN (4 November 2021). "Karnataka: Sculptor from Mysuru chiselled 14-ft Shankaracharya's statue". The Times of India.
- Tola, Fernando (1989). "On the Date of Maṇḍana Miśra and Śaṅkara and Their Doctrinal Relation". Annals of the Bhandarkar Oriental Research Institute. 70 (1/4): 37–46. ISSN 0378-1143. JSTOR 41693459.
- Viswanathan, Manoj (2022). "On PM Modi's Kerala visit, BJP to project Adi Shankaracharya as national icon". New Indian Express.
- Whaling, Frank (1979). "Shankara and Buddhism". Journal of Indian Philosophy. 7 (1): 1–42. doi:10.1007/BF02561251. JSTOR 23440361. S2CID 170613052.
- White, David Gordon, ed. (2000). Introduction. In: Tantra in practice. Princeton and Oxford: Princeton University Press.

Web citations

Religious titles
Preceded by Bhagawan Govinda Bhagavat Pada	Jagadguru of Sringeri Sharada Peetham ?–820 (videha-mukti)	Succeeded by Sureshwaracharya
