= Rambachan =

Rambachan is a surname. Notable people with the surname include:

- Anantanand Rambachan, Hindu studies scholar
- Surujrattan Rambachan, Trinidad and Tobago politician, academic and cultural activist
