= Atma bodha =

Knowledge of the soul . It is short work attributed to Shankaracharya

Ātma-bōdha

Information
- Religion: Advaita Vedanta (Hinduism)
- Author: Attributed to Adi Shankara (8th cent. CE)
- Language: Sanskrit
- Period: 11th-14th cent. CE

Ātma-bodha (Sanskrit: आत्मबोधः ) is a short Advaita Vedanta text composed in Sanskrit. Traditionally it is attributed to Adi Shankara (8th c. CE), but likely composed in the 11th to early 14th century. The text in sixty-eight verses describes the path to Self-knowledge or the awareness of Atman.

The Vedanta tradition states that the text was written by Shankara for his disciple, Sanandana, also known as Padmapāda. Ātma-bodha is a prakarṇa grantha: literature that explains the terms and terminologies used in the Śāstras but they do not contribute any original thought.

== Etymology ==
Atmabodha means "Self-knowledge", self-awareness, or the "possession of a knowledge of the soul or the supreme spirit".

== Authorship and dating ==
Ātma-bodha, written in Sanskrit, is traditionally ascribed to Adi Shankara, but this attribution is unlikely. Stylometric analysis of the work does not verify Shankara's authorship, (Note: Andrijanic (2024, p. 3): "the state–of–the–art stylometric method, the General Imposters Framework, which does not recognize Ātmabodha as Śaṅkara’s work"; see The General Imposters Method and Wily Beguiled for an explanation of this method.) though Andrijanic notes that this result "must not be considered a final verdict, but rather a call for a more detailed historical-philological analysis"; it also doesn't meet Hacker's colophon criterion, and contains instances of "post–Śaṅkarite doctrinal and terminological developments [...], specifically in the comprehension of the concept of ignorance, alongside the introduction of later terminology and concepts." According to Andrijanic, "[t]he available evidence suggests a tentative dating of the work between the 11th and early 14th centuries."

Andrijanic also notes that the work is "certainly closer to the original Sankara's doctrine than some other Sankarite pseudepigraphia", considers its teaching on limiting adjuncts (upadhis) "consistent with Sankara's original works", and notes that most of the similes it uses for the atman are "well-attested in Sankara's works".

== Contents ==
The original text consists of sixty-eight verses and describes the way to the attainment of the knowledge of the Atman. Swami Chinmayananda characterizes the work as an introductory text for students seeking to understand Vedantic philosophy.

=== Knowledge, action and practice ===
Like the Vivekachudamani, the Atma Bodha teaches that the Ultimate Reality or Brahman, the foundation of all, is beyond name and form, and is of the nature of pure consciousness, and can be realized through the Path of Knowledge.

For the Wisdom of Self is the one way to Freedom,
leading beyond all other paths,
As cooking cannot be accomplished without fire,
so Freedom cannot be attained without wisdom.

— Ātma-bōdha 2,

Atma bodha distinguishes knowledge from action, while recommending constant contemplation. Atmabodha text reiterates that the Path of Knowledge consists in shravana (hearing the instructions of a teacher), manana (reflecting on what is heard) and nididhyasana (meditating on Truth with single-minded devotion); viveka (philosophical discrimination) and vairagya (renunciation of all that which is unreal) are the basic disciplines required to be followed and that it is not possible for actions (Karma, fasting, vows, pilgrimage) to destroy ignorance (avidya) and attain liberation (moksha).

Verse 3 explains the difference between action and knowledge:

अविरोधितया कर्म नाविद्यां विनिवर्तयेत् |
विद्याविद्या निहन्त्येव तेजस्तिमिरसङ्ववत् ||

"Action cannot destroy ignorance, as it is not opposed to ignorance.
Knowledge does verily destroy ignorance just as light destroys deep darkness"

— Ātma-bodha 3,

Verse 66-68 describes the process of acquiring knowledge: through study, reflection and meditation, (Note: Shankara, in Brahmasutrabhasya, ch. 4 sect. 1 sutra 2, states that "Repetition will be unnecessary for one who can realize the Self as Brahman after hearing "That thou art" once only. But for one who cannot do so, repetition is a necessity" (Gambhirananda 2021, p. 815) one exhaust one's vasanas and desires and discovers one's true Self. Through self-effort, one gains Self-knowledge and realizes the inner Self as the infinite, all pervading Brahman.

=== Brahman, atman, and the world ===
Atma Bodha describes the true nature of the individual self as Brahman, the Absolute Reality, which is of the nature of sat-chit-anand, or existence-knowledge-bliss. Brahman is the substratum on which all the manifested things of the world are projected by imagination; the all-pervading Atman illumines the mind and the senses and is manifest in the intellect (Buddhi) like a reflection in a clean mirror.

The yogi endowed with complete enlightenment sees,
through the eye of Knowledge,
the entire universe in his own Self,
regards everything as the Self and nothing else.

— Ātma-bōdha, 47,

=== Jivanmukta ===
The self-abiding Jivanmukta, according to verses 49-51 of Atma Bodha, is satisfied with the bliss derived from Atman (soul, self), is free from hate for anyone, seeks unity, is perfected in peace, grows radiant, rejoices with what he has, is the one who "shines inwardly, like a lamp placed inside a vase".

== Commentaries and translations ==
The first translation of Ātma-bodha into English language from Sanskrit by J. Taylor was published in 1812 titled - The Knowledge of Spirit, later another translation rendered by Rev. J. F. Kearns, along with English commentary and titled - Atma Bodha Prakashika, was published in the May, 1876 issue of The Indian Antiquary (pages 125-133).

An English translation and commentary by Swami Nikhilananda was published in India in 1947 by Sri Ramakrishna Math, Chennai. Sri Ramana Maharshi translated Ātma-bodha into Tamil in verse-form. Chinmayananda Saraswati's edition includes the Sanskrit verses, English translations and explanatory discussion.

== See also ==
- Brahma Sutras
- Upadesasahasri

== Sources ==
- Andrijanic, Ivan (2024). "DATE AND AUTHORSHIP OF THE ĀTMABODHA". DISPUTATIO PHILOSOPHICA · Vol 25. · No. 1 · 3–18.
- Chinmayananda (1965). Atma Bodha of Sri Śaṅkarācharya. Central Chinmaya Mission Trust.
- Isaeva, Natalia (1993). Shankara and Indian Philosophy. State University of New York Press. ISBN 978-0-7914-1281-7.
- Gambhirananda (2021) [1965], Brahma Sutra Bhasya of Sankaracarya, Advaita Ashram
