= Eka shloki =

Sanskrit hymn

Ekashloki Sanskrit: एकश्लोकी, romanized: Ekaślokī is a Sanskrit term that combines two words: "Eka" meaning "one" and "Shloki" meaning "verse" or "couplet". It refers to a composition that encapsulates an entire epic, scripture, or philosophical concept within a single verse. The objective is to distill vast, complex narratives into their absolute essence, saying everything in the fewest words possible.

== Etymology ==
Ekashloki is a compounded Sanskrit word from 'eka' which means one, and 'shloka' which means verse. Thus, ekashloki literally translates to "one-verse".

The numeral 'Eka', which translates to 'one', can be compounded with many other words to form a new derivative word. The word Ekashloki is a compounded derivative: it is formed by adding the possessive suffix -in (इन्) to the compound Ekashloka (eka+shloka) making it Ekashlokin (एकश्लोकिन्) , meaning 'that which contains or relates to a single verse.

== Description ==
It is the ultimate summary or cliff notes of ancient Indian scriptures - a single verse designed for easy memorization, daily recitation, and prayer. It allows devotees and scholars to carry the very essence of a story or philosophy with them, literally, in just a single verse.

== Shankaracharya's Eka Shloki ==
Adi Shankaracharya has also written a concise work called Ekashloki, which explains the entire philosophy of Advaita Vedanta in a single, profound verse. This compact composition, also known as Kim Jyotih Stotra, is structured as a dialogue between a guru and a disciple, guiding the seeker through a series of questions that lead inward from the external world to the ultimate realization of the Self. It begins with the simple inquiry, "What is the light?" and systematically peels away layers of identity, starting from the sun and a lamp, moving to the eyes and the intellect, until the disciple finally recognizes the supreme light within: the Atman, or true Self.

किं ज्योतिस्तवभानुमानहनि मे रात्रौ प्रदीपादिकं

स्यादेवं रविदीपदर्शनविधौ किं ज्योतिराख्याहि मे।

चक्षुस्तस्य निमीलनादिसमये किं धीर्धियो दर्शने

किं तत्राहमतो भवान्परमकं ज्योतिस्तदस्मि प्रभो॥

इति श्रीमत्परमहंसपरिव्राजकाचार्यस्य

श्रीगोविन्दभगवत्पूज्यपादशिष्यस्य

श्रीमच्छङ्करभगवतः कृतौ एकश्लोकी सम्पूर्णा॥

kiṃ jyotistava bhānumānahani me rātrau pradīpādikaṃ

syādevaṃ ravīdīpadarśanavidhau kiṃ jyotirākhyāhi me |

cakṣustasya nimīlanādisamaye kiṃ dhīrdhiyo darśane

kiṃ tatrāhamato bhavān paramakaṃ jyotistadasmi prabho ||

iti śrīmatparamahaṃsaparivrājakācāryasya

śrīgovindabhagavatpūjyapādaśiṣyasya

śrīmacchaṅkarabhagavataḥ kṛtau ekaślokī sampūrṇā.

which means -

- Guru: "What is the light (that helps you see)?"
- Shishya: "During the day, the sun is my light. At night, a lamp is my light."
- Guru: "Let that be so. But what is the light by which you see the sun and the lamp themselves?"
- Shishya: "The eyes."
- Guru: "When your eyes are closed, what is the light by which you perceive?"
- Shishya: "The intellect (dhee)."
- Guru: "And what is the light that reveals the intellect—the very source of your thoughts and perceptions?"

At this final question, the student, having been guided inward step-by-step, arrives at the ultimate realization :

- Shishya: "For that, it is I, the Self (Aham)."
- Guru: "Therefore, you are that supreme light."
- Shishya: "I realize that I am That (Tad Asmi Prabho)."

=== Philosophical essence ===
The Ekashloki is a brilliant exercise in self-inquiry (Atma Vichara). It systematically peels away the layers of identity that a human being typically clings to:

- Gross layer (Annamaya kosha): The student first identifies with the physical senses and external light sources (sun, lamp).
- Subtle layer (Manomaya kosha): He then moves to the sense organs (eyes).
- Causal layer (Vijnanamaya kosha): He goes deeper to the intellect, the seat of thoughts and reasoning.

Finally, he arrives at the Witness-Consciousness (Sakshi Chaitanya) - the "I" that is aware of the intellect itself. This is the ultimate realization of Advaita Vedanta: that one's true identity is not the body, mind, or intellect, but the self-luminous Atman, which is one with Brahman, the Supreme Reality. The verse concludes with the student affirming "I am That Light", echoing the great Mahavakya, Sanskrit: अहं ब्रह्मास्मि, romanized: Ahaṃ Brahmāsmi, lit. 'I am Brahman'.

=== Authenticity and literary context ===
While firmly attributed to Shankaracharya in tradition, scholars note that over 300 texts are ascribed to him, and many were written by admirers or later scholars. However, the Ekashloki is widely accepted as one of his genuine short works, categorized among his Prakaranas (introductory topical expositions) and hymns that highlight the role of devotion (bhakti) in purifying the heart of a seeker.

A book published by Brahma vidya kuteer (2020) titled 'Prarthana satpadi and ekasloki with The commentary of tattva prakasika by swami tattvavidananda saraswati' provides a detailed commentary on this work, noting its "interesting stylistic device" of using questions and answers to unfold the topic of self-enquiry.

Shankaracharya's Ekashloki considered as presentation of non-dual philosophy and is considered as accessible to beginners and contemplative for advanced seekers.The verse considered as guiding an inquirer from the external world of objects to the concept of self. Believed as a testament of concise expression, Vedanta's deep ideas are conveyed in a single verse rather than in voluminous texts.

=== Metre ===
The shloka is composed in the Shardulvikriditam (Śārdūlavikrīḍitam) (शार्दूलविक्रीडितम्) metre, one of the most popular and elaborate metres in Sanskrit poetry. The name Shardulvikriditam literally means "tiger's play" or "sport of the tiger," evoking a sense of majestic and powerful movement, which is reflected in its rhythmic structure. It belongs to the Atidhṛti class of metres and is characterized by having 19 syllables in each of its four quarters (pādas). The syllabic pattern follows a fixed sequence of gaṇas (metrical feet of three syllables): Mā (मा) (गुरु-गुरु-गुरु), Sa (स) (लघु-लघु-गुरु), Ja (ज) (लघु-गुरु-लघु), Sa (स) (लघु-लघु-गुरु), Tā (ता) (गुरु-गुरु-लघु), Tā (ता) (गुरु-गुरु-लघु), followed by a final Guru (गुरुः) or a Laghu (लघुः). A caesura (pause)(यतिः) is traditionally observed after the 12th syllable. This metre is frequently employed by classical poets for verses of philosophical weight, devotional fervor, or descriptive grandeur, making it a fitting vehicle for the profound inquiry into the nature of the Self presented in this verse.

== Eka Shloki Ramayanam ==
The Eka shloki ramayana (Sanskrit: एकश्लोकि रामायणम्) is a Sanskrit religious text that condenses the entire narrative of the Hindu epic Ramayana into a single verse (śloka). The verse systematically enumerates the epic's major events in chronological order, including Rama's exile, the abduction of Sita, the alliance with Sugriva, the slaying of Vali and Ravana, and the burning of Lanka. It is traditionally believed that a reverential recitation of this single verse yields the same spiritual merit as reading the complete Ramayana. The composition is also a notable piece in the performing arts, where it is often used as a text for "Eka Patraabhinayam" a solo dance performance in Bharatanatyam that requires a single artist to portray all the characters and episodes of the epic. The authorship of the Eka Shloki Ramayana remains uncertain, with some traditions attributing it to the poet Tulsidas, though this is not definitively established by historical sources.

आदौ रामतपोवनादि गमनं हत्वा मृगं काञ्चनं

वैदेहीहरणं जटायुमरणं सुग्रीवसंभाषणम् ।

बालीनिग्रहणं समुद्रतरणं लङ्कापुरीदाहनं

पश्चाद्रावणकुम्भकर्णहननमेतद्धि रामायणम् ॥

ādau rāmatapovanādigamanaṃ hatvā mṛgaṃ kāñcanaṃ

vaidehīharaṇaṃ jaṭāyumaraṇaṃ sugrīvasambhāṣaṇam.

vālīnigrahaṇaṃ samudrataraṇaṃ laṅkāpurīdāhanaṃ

paścādrāvaṇakumbhakarṇahananametaddhi rāmāyaṇam..

Once Rama went to forest, He chased the deer, Sita was kidnapped, Jatayu was killed, There were talks with Sugreeva, Bali was killed, The sea was crossed, Lanka was burnt, And later Ravana and Kumbha karna, Were also killed. This in short is the story of Ramayanam.

The Shloka is composed in the Shardulavikriditam (Śārdūlavikrīḍita) metre, a classical Sanskrit meter characterized by four pādas (quarters) of nineteen syllables each, which can be verified by counting the total syllables in the verse.

== Eka Shloki Bhagavatam ==
The Eka Shloki Bhagavatam (Sanskrit: एकश्लोकि भागवतम्) is a concise Sanskrit composition that encapsulates the entire narrative and philosophical essence of the Bhagavata Purana within a single verse. It belongs to a genre of condensed scriptures (stokas) in Hindu literature that summarize extensive epic and puranic narratives into brief, memorable formats suitable for daily recitation and devotional practice. The verse systematically enumerates the major life events and divine plays (līlās) of Lord Krishna in chronological order, covering his divine birth, childhood, and his role in the Mahabharata war. Reciting this single verse with faith is traditionally believed to confer the same spiritual merit as reading the entire Bhagavata Purana, serving as an accessible entry point for devotees who wish to connect with its essential teachings. The authorship of the Eka Shloki Bhagavatam is generally considered traditional or anonymous, and it remains a popular text in devotional contexts, often included in stotra collections and recited in homes and temples.

आदौ देवकिदेविगर्भजननं गोपीगृहे वर्धनं

मायापूतनजीवितापहरणं गोवर्धनोद्धारणम् ।

कंसच्छेदनकौरवादिहननं कुन्तीसुतां पालनम्

एतद्भागवतं पुराणकथितं श्रीकृष्णलीलामृतम् ।।

ādau devakidevigarbhajananaṃ gopīgṛhe vardhanam

māyāpūtanajīvitāpaharaṇaṃ govardhanoddhāraṇam.

kaṃsacchedanakauravādihananaṃ kuṃtīsutāṃ pālanam

etadbhāgavataṃ purāṇakathitaṃ śrīkṛṣṇalīlāmṛtam..

The verse means:-

Starting with birth from the womb of Devaki, growth in the house of cow-herds, killing of Putana, lifting of Govardhana mountain, the cutting of Kamsa and the killing of kauravas, protecting the sons of Kunti - This is Bhagavatam as told in the epics. This is the nectar of Shri Krishna's lila.

== See also ==
- Dasha Shloki
- Chhand
- Chatuh Shloki
