= Upadeśasāhasrī =

8th-century text of Adi Shankara

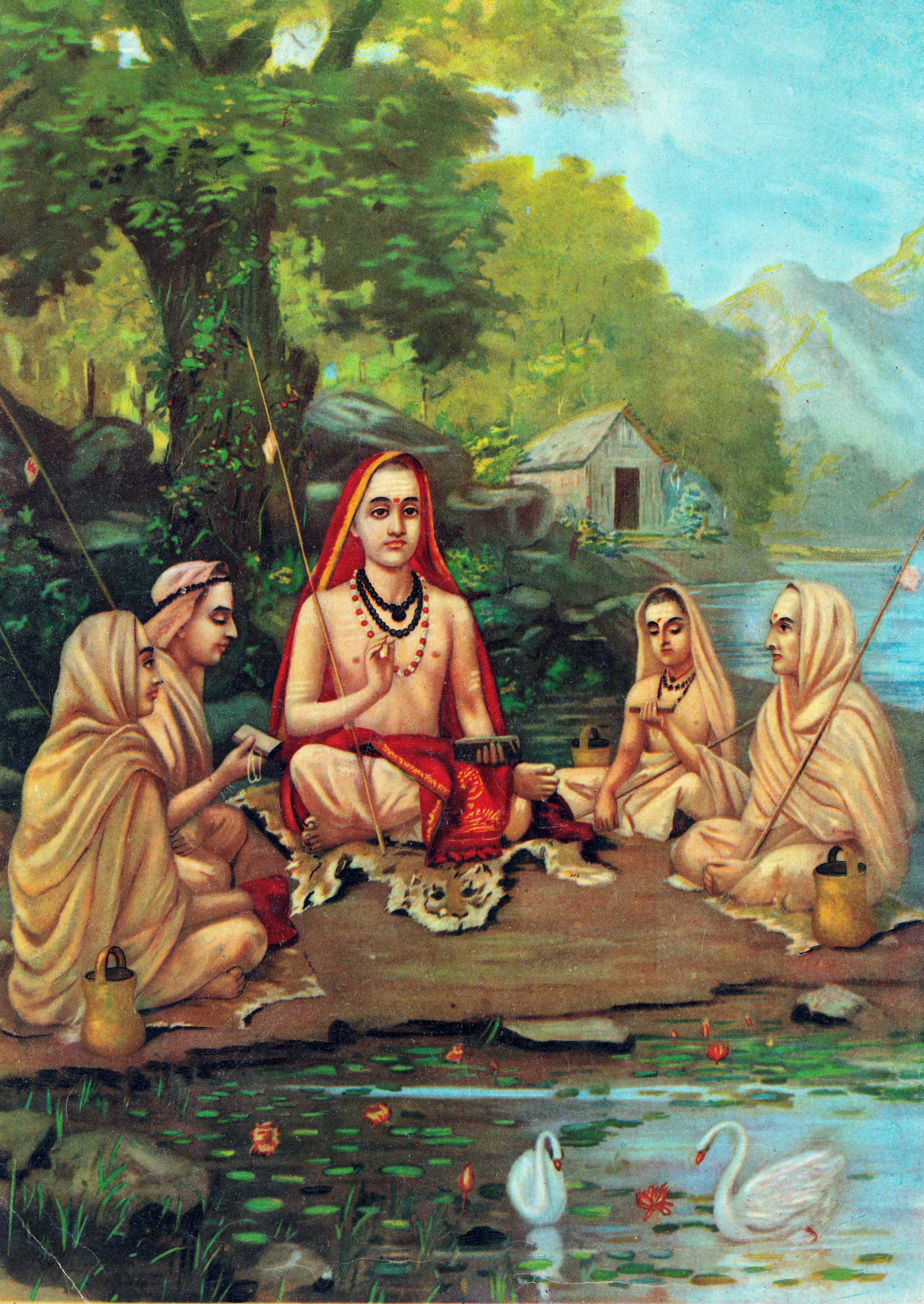
Upadeshasahasri is a text authored by Adi Shankara (above), a scholar of the Advaita Vedanta school of Hinduism.

Upadeśasāhasrī (Sanskrit: उपदेशसाहस्री, lit. 'A thousand teachings') is a Sanskrit text by Adi Shankara, generally dated to 8th-century CE. Considered a prakaraṇa grantha, the Upadeśasāhasrī is considered one of Shankara's most important non-commentarial works.

== Content ==
Upadeśasāhasrī is divided into two parts – one is in metric verse and another is in prose. There are nineteen chapters (prakarana) in the verse (or metrical) part (padyabandha), and three chapters in the prose part. According to Mayeda, "Manuscripts indicate that the two parts were regarded as independent works, as it were, and studied or commented upon separately. They also suggest the possibility that any single chapter could be selected, copied, and studied apart from the rest. This means that reading of the text may begin anywhere." Mayeda further notes that Shankara was primarily concerned with moksha, "and not with the establishment of a complete system of philosophy or theology," following Potter, who qualifies Shankara as a "speculative philosopher."

NB: Jagadananda 1949 starts with the prose part, where Mayeda 1992 starts with the metrical (verse) part. Here Mayeda's sequence is followed, with I referring to the metrical (verse) part, and II referring to the prose part.

=== I. Metrical (verse) part ===
The metrical part "discusses and repeatedly explains many basic problems of Advaita or "non-dualism" from different points of view" in a non-systematic way. Mayeda states that "He first denies the validity of all kinds of action caused by ignorance (ajnana). At the same time he asserts that knowledge (vidya) is the remover of ignorance which is the cause of transmigratory existence (samsara)". Positing that the "I," Atman, is self-evident, Shankara argues that Atman, Awareness, Consciousness, is the True Self, and not the mind and the body. The sruti (scriptures) point to this truth with statements like "Tat Tvam Asi." Comprehending one's true identity is regarded to liberate one from samsara, the cycle of transmigration and rebirth.

==== Chapter 1. Pure Consciousness ====
Chapter I.1 starts with the exclamation

Salutation to the all-knowing Pure Consciousness [chaitanya] which pervades all, is all, abides in the hearts of all beings, and is beyond all objects [of knowledge].

Shankara then rejects action as a means to liberation, as it leads to bondage. Since action is related to ignorance, "associated with a misconception of Atman as "I am agent; this is mine," only knowledge of Brahman will lead to liberation. Being ignorant, people assume Atman to be identical to the body. Yet, "[The Sruti passage,] "Not thus! Not so!" (Brh. Up. II,3,6), excluding the body and the like, leaves Atman free from distinction. Therby nescience is removed."

==== Chapter 2. Negation ====
Chapter II.2 states that only Atman cannot be negated when inquiring "I am not this, I am not this," thereby arriving at the understanding of Atman.

==== Chapter 18. That Thou Art ====
Chapter 18, Thou Art That, the longest chapter of the Upadeśasāhasrī, is devoted to considerations on the insight "I am ever-free, the existent" (sat), and the statement "Tat Tvam Asi," which according to Shankara separates the Real, Atman, from the unreal.

According to Shankara, the I-notion is self-evident, and the statement "I am the existent" refers to the basis of this I-notion, the inner Atman. The sruti explains that the notions "my" and "this" are situated in the intellect, and perishable, while Consciousness and the Seer are immovable and imperishable, thus separating "notions" from Awareness. The statement "Tat Tvam Asi" then is meaningful because it refers to Tat, Atman.

Recognizing oneself as "the Existent-Brahman," which is mediated by scriptural teachings, is contrasted with the notion of "I act," which is mediated by relying on sense-perception and the like. The statement "Thou art That" "remove[s] the delusion of a hearer," "so through sentences as "Thou art That" one knows one's own Atman, the witness of all internal organs," and not from any actions. (Note: Up.I.18.219: "The renunciation of all actions becomes the means for discriminating the meaning of the word "Thou" since there is an [Upanisadic] teaching, "Having become calm, self-controlled [..., one sees Atman there in oneself]" (Bhr. Up. IV, 4, 23).")

According to Shankara, "right knowledge arises at the moment of hearing," and Shankara is ambivalent on the need for meditation on the Upanishadic mahavyaka. He rejects prasamcaksa or prasamkhyana meditation, that is, meditation on the meaning of the sentences, and in Up. II.3 recommends parisamkhyana, in which Atman is separated from everything that is not Atman, that is, the sense-objects and sense-organs, and the pleasant and unpleasant things and merit and demerit connected with them. Yet, Shankara then concludes with declaring that only Atman exists, stating that "all the sentences of the Upanishads concerning non-duality of Atman should be fully contemplated, should be contemplated." As Mayeda states, "how they [prasamcaksa or prasamkhyana versus parisamkhyana] differ from each other in not known."

=== II. Prose part ===
The prose part intends to explain "how to teach the means of final release" to seekers. The three chapters seem to correspond with the three stages of sravana (listening to the teachings), manana (thinking about the teachings) and nididhyāsana (meditation on the teachings).

==== Chapter 1. How to enlighten the pupil ====
Chapter II.1 opens with the statement

II.1.1. Now we shall explain how to teach the means to final release for the benefit of seekers thereafter with faith and desire.
II.1.2. The means to final release is knowledge [of Brahman].

Knowledge of Brahman is to obtained by a worthy pupil from an accomplished teacher, (Note: Jagadananda (1949, p. 5), Up.II.1.6: "The teacher is one who is endowed with the power of furnishing arguments pro and con, of understanding questions [of the student], and remembers them. The teacher possesses tranquility, self-control, compassion and a desire to help others, who is versed in the Śruti texts (Vedas, Upanishads), and unattached to pleasures here and hereafter, knows the subject and established in that knowledge. He is never a transgressor of the rules of conduct, devoid of weaknesses such as ostentation, pride, deceit, cunning, jugglery, jealousy, falsehood, egotism and attachment. The teacher's sole aim is to help others and a desire to impart the knowledge.) who should train the students in archiving the virtues necessary for proper understanding. (Note: Jagadananda (1949, p. 3-4), Up.II.1.4-5: "When the teacher find from signs that knowledge has not been grasped or has been wrongly grasped by the student, he should remove the causes of non-comprehension in the student. This includes the student's past and present knowledge, want of previous knowledge of what constitutes subjects of discrimination and rules of reasoning, behavior such as unrestrained conduct and speech, courting popularity, vanity of his parentage, ethical flaws that are means contrary to those causes. The teacher must enjoin means in the student that are enjoined by the Śruti and Smrti, such as avoidance of anger, Yamas consisting of Ahimsa and others, also the rules of conduct that are not inconsistent with knowledge. He [teacher] should also thoroughly impress upon the student qualities like humility, which are the means to knowledge.) The teacher teaches the srutis concerned with the oneness of Atman with Brahman, referring to a large number of sruti-statements. The teacher then continues by reinforcing disidentification from societal status and the body, The teacher then shows how the sruti and smriti describe the "marks of Atman," explaining how the Atman is different from body, caste, family, and purifying ceremonies. Final release is obtained by the knowledge that Atman is identical to Brahman.

II.1.44. One, who is eager to realize this right knowledge spoken of in the Sruti, should rise above the desire for a son, for wealth, for this world and the next, which are described in a five-fold (Note: See Brihadaranyaka Upanishad chapter 1.4) manner, and are the outcome of a false reference to the Self of Varna (castes, colors, classes) and orders of life. These references are contradictory to right knowledge, and reasons are given by the Srutis regarding the prohibition of the acceptance of difference. For when the knowledge that the one non-dual Atman (Self) is beyond phenomenal existence is generated by the scriptures and reasoning, there cannot exist a knowledge side by side that is contradictory or contrary to it.

==== Chapter 2. Awareness ====
II.2.62 - 2.63. Disciple asked, "Sir, is the mutual superimposition of the body and the Self made by the combination of the body or by the Self?"
The teacher said, "Does it matter if it be made by the one or the other?"

== Sources ==
- Isaeva, N. V. (1993). Shankara and Indian Philosophy. SUNY Press. ISBN 978-0-7914-1281-7.
- Jacobsen, Knut A. (1 January 2008). Theory and Practice of Yoga: 'Essays in Honour of Gerald James Larson. Motilal Banarsidass. pp. 75–. ISBN 978-81-208-3232-9.
- Jagadananda, S. (1949), Upadeshasahasri (PDF), Vedanta Press, ISBN 978-8171200597, OCLC 218363449
- Mayeda, Sengaku (1992), "An Introduction to the Life and Thought of Sankara", in Mayeda, Sengaku (ed.), A Thousand Teachings: The Upadeśasāhasrī of Śaṅkara, State University of New York City Press, ISBN 0-7914-0944-9
- A Thousand Teachings: The Upadeśasāhasrī of Śaṅkara. Translated by Mayeda, Sengaku. Motilal Banarsidass. 2006. ISBN 8120827716.
- Meister, Chad; Copan, Paul, eds. (25 February 2010). The Routledge Companion to Philosophy of Religion. Routledge. ISBN 978-1-134-18001-1.
- Potter, Karl (2008), Encyclopedia of Indian Philosophies Vol. III, Motilal Banarsidass, ISBN 978-8120803107
- Śaṅkara (1979), A Thousand Teachings: The Upadeśasāhasrī of Śaṅkara, translated by Mayeda, Sengaku, SUNY Press, ISBN 978-0-7914-0944-2
