= Prajna Pravah =

Indian organisation

Prajna Pravah is an Indian Hindutva organisation that works to propagate an anti-western nationalistic Hinducentric-view of India's cultural and intellectual heritage. It is one of the front organisations of Rashtriya Swayamsevak Sangh (RSS) and works as its intellectual arm.

== History and leadership ==
It was founded in the early 1980s, while Balasaheb Deoras was heading RSS and was led by K. S. Sudarshan and Dattopant Thengadi. The group now has branches in hundreds of universities of the country and is currently led by J. Nandakumar, a senior RSS pracharak, as its national convener. Vinay Dixit, Deepak Sharma and Chandra Kant are its national co-convenors.

== Organisation and activities ==
The organisation works through various state level organisations, which might bear different names in each state. These have then branches at the level of division, district and universities. It also works with other national level organisations to create a network of academics, working to create a pro-India narrative.

It conducts regular training sessions and conferences, and every year, there is a Lok Manthan with the most recent one held in 2024 in Bhagyanagar, Karnataka.
