= Anantanand Rambachan =

Hindu studies scholar

Dr Anantanand Rambachan is a Professor Emeritus of Religion at St. Olaf College, Minnesota. He was also Forum Humanum Visiting Professor at the Academy for the Study of World Religions at the University of Hamburg in Germany between (2013-2017). He has published extensively in the field of Advaita Vedanta tradition, Hindu ethics, liberation theology, and interreligious dialogue.

== Education ==
Rambachan was raised in a Hindu family in Trinidad and completed undergraduate studies at the University of the West Indies, St. Augustine, Trinidad in 1972. He also attended a three-year residential course on vedanta in Sanskrit at the Sandeepany Sadhanalaya, an aśrama of Chinmaya Mission in Mumbai, India under the guidance of Dayananda Saraswati. He received his M.A. (Distinction) and Ph.D. degrees from the University of Leeds, in the United Kingdom, where he researched "classical Advaita epistemology and, in particular, the significance of the śruti as a source of valid knowledge (pramāṇa) in Śaṅkara."

Between 1985 and 2021, Rambachan taught in the Department of Religion at St. Olaf College, Minnesota, USA, where he "continued my research and writing on Advaita, the Hindu tradition in a global context, Hindu ethics, Hinduism and contemporary issues and interreligious dialogue." Starting 2013, Professor Rambachan was Forum Humanum Visiting Professor at the Academy for World Religions at Hamburg University, Germany until 2017. He retired in 2021.

== Activities ==
Rambachan was a Professor Emeritus of Religion at St. Olaf College, Minnesota, USA. He taught at St. Olaf between 1985 and 2021. Rambachan is a Hindu and was the first non-Christian chair of the Religion Department at this Lutheran college.

His scholarship has included review of the theology of Swami Vivekananda.

He is a member of the Theological Education Steering Committee of the American Academy of Religion, the Advisory Council of the Centre for the Study of Religion and Society, University of Victoria, BC, Canada, an advisor to Harvard University's Pluralism Project, Chair of the Board for the MN Multifaith Network, and is a member with Consultation on Population and Ethics, a non-governmental organization, affiliated with the United Nations.

Rambachan is very involved with interreligious dialogue and more specifically, Hindu-Christian dialogue. He continues to participate in interreligious activities, both nationally and internationally. He is an active member and participant in the dialogue program of the World Council of Churches and participated in the last four General Assemblies.

From 2013 to 2017, Rambachan published articles as an author on the Huffington Post, covering topics related to Hinduism. From 2017 on, he moved his writings to the blog portion of his website.

He has traveled and lectured in Norway, Switzerland, Germany, Australia, Mauritius, South Africa, Kenya, India, Trinidad, Brazil, The Vatican, Japan, Italy, Spain, Canada and the United Kingdom. A series of 25 lectures was broadcast internationally by the BBC. Rambachan also led the first White House celebration of the Hindu Festival of Diwali in 2003. He continues to return to Trinidad on a yearly basis and was awarded the Chaconia Gold Medal, Trinidad and Tobago's second highest national honor for public service.

== Selected works ==
- Rambachan, Anantanand (1991), Accomplishing the Accomplished: the Vedas as a Source of Valid Knowledge in Śankara, Honolulu: University of Hawaii Press, ISBN 0-8248-1358-8
- Rambachan, Anantanand (1992), The Hindu Vision, Delhi: Motilal Banarsidass
- Rambachan, Anantanand (1994), The Limits of Scripture: Vivekananda's Reinterpretation of the Vedas, Honolulu: University of Hawaii Press, ISBN 0-8248-1542-4
- Rambachan, Anantanand (1999), Gītānidarśana: Similes of the Bhagavadgītā, Delhi: Motilal Banarsidass
- Rambachan, Anantanand (2006), The Advaita Worldview: God, World, and Humanity, Albany, N.Y: State University of New York Press, ISBN 0-7914-6852-6
- Rambachan, Anantanand (2014), A Hindu Theology of Liberation: Not-Two Is Not One, Albany, N.Y: State University of New York Press, ISBN 978-1-4384-5455-9

== Sources ==
- National Library and Information System of Trinidad and Tobago
- St. Olaf College
- World Council of Churches Address Notification
- Rambachan, Anant Anand (1984), The attainment of moksha according to Shankara and Vivekananda with special reference to the significance of scripture (sruti) and experience (anubhabva) (PDF), University of Leeds
- Rambachan, Anantanand (1991), Accomplishing the Accomplished: The Vedas as a Source of Valid Knowledge in Shankara, University of Hawaii Press
- Rambachan, Anatanand (1994), The Limits of Scripture: Vivekananda's Reinterpretation of the Vedas, University of Hawaii Press
