= Adi Shankara bibliography =

Adi Shankara, a Hindu philosopher of the Advaita Vedanta school, composed a number of commentarial works. Due to his later influence, a large body of works that is central to the Advaita Vedanta interpretation of the Prasthanatrayi, the canonical texts consisting of the Upanishads, the Bhagavad Gita and the Brahma Sutras, is also attributed to him. (Note: See "Works of Adi Shankara". Archived from the original on 18 June 2006.) While his own works mainly consist of commentaries, the later works summarize various doctrines of the Advaita Vedanta tradition, including doctrines that diverge from those of Adi Shankara.

== Overview ==
=== Methodology ===
Shankara formulates the doctrine of Advaita Vedanta by validating his arguments on the basis of quotations from the Vedas and other Hindu scriptures.

A large portion of his works is polemical in nature. He directs his polemics mostly against the Sankhya, Bauddha, Jaina, Vaisheshika and other non-vedantic Hindu philosophies.

=== Authorship ===
While Shankaracharya's authorship of the commentaries on the Brahman Sutra, the ten principal Upanishads, as well as the Bhagavad Gita is beyond doubt, many works thought to be authored by him are debated and questioned regarding their authorship today. This includes some of the best-known and important Advaita texts, namely the Vivekchudamani (Vivekacūḍāmaṇi), Maniratnamala, Para-puja, and the Mandukya Upanishad (Māṇḍūkya Upaniṣad) Bashya (Bhāṣya).

=== Classification ===
Traditionally, Advaita Vedanta works are classified as:

- Bashya, commentary
- Prakaraṇa grantha, philosophical treatise
- Stotra, devotional hymn

The commentaries serve to provide a consistent interpretation of the scriptural texts from the perspective of Advaita Vedanta. The philosophical treatises provide various methodologies to the student to understand the doctrine. The devotional hymns are rich in poetry and piety, serving to highlight the helplessness of the devotee and the glory of the deity.

== Authentic works ==
=== Bhashya (Bhāṣya) ===
Adi Shankara wrote Bhāṣya (commentaries) on:

- Brahmasūtra
- Aitareya Upaniṣad (Rigveda)
- Bṛhadāraṇyaka Upaniṣad (Śukla Yajurveda)
- Īśa Upaniṣad (Śukla Yajurveda)
- Taittirīya Upaniṣad (Kṛṣṇa Yajurveda)
- Śvetāśvatara Upaniṣad (Kṛṣṇa Yajurveda) (Note: The authenticity of the Bhashya on "Shvetashvatara Upanishad" ascribed to Shankara, is doubtful and often considered unauthentic.)
- Kaṭha Upaniṣad (Kṛṣṇa Yajurveda)
- Kena Upaniṣad (samaveda)
- Chāndogya Upaniṣad (samaveda)
- Muṇḍaka Upaniṣad (Atharvaveda)
- Praśna Upaniṣad (Atharvaveda)
- Bhagavadgīta (Mahabhārata)
- Vishnu Sahasranama (Mahabhārata)
- Sānatsujātiya (Mahabhārata)
- Gāyatri Mantraṃ

=== Other ===
- Upadesha Sahasri (Upadeśasāhasri)

== Attributed works ==
=== Bhashya ===
- Mandukya Upanishad (Atharvaveda) and Gaudpada Karika (Gauḍapāda Kārika): The authorship of Shankara of this Bhasya is disputed. Nakamura concludes that Shankara was not the author, for several reasons. Shankara understood Buddhist thought, while the author of the commentary shows misunderstandings of Buddhist thought. The commentary uses the terms vijnapti and vjnaptimatra, which is "a uniquely Buddhist usage", and does not appear in Shankara's commentary on the Brahma-sutras. The two commentaries also quote different Upanishads. Nevertheless, Nakamura also concludes: "Although the commentary to the Madukya is not actually by Shankara, it may be assumed that there is nothing drastically wrong in using it as a source when discussing early Vedanta philosophy".

=== Prakaraṇa grantha ===
The following treatises are attributed to Adi Shankara, but probably composed much later, from the 13th century onward, when Advaita Vedanta received royal support in the Vijayanagara Empire, and was fused with yoga:

- Vivekachudamani: The authenticity of the "Vivekachudamani", a well-known work ascribed to Shankara, is doubtful, though it is "so closely interwoven into the spiritual heritage of Shankara that any analysis of his perspective which fails to consider [this work] would be incomplete".
- Shatshloki (Śataśloki)
- Dasha Shloki (Daśaśloki)
- Ekshloki (Ekāśloki)
- Panchikaranam (Pañcīkaraṇa)
- Aatmabodha (Ātma bodha)
- Aparokshanubhooti (Aparokṣānubhūti)
- Sadhana Panchakam (Sādhana Pañcakaṃ)
- Nirvana Shatakam (Nirvāṇa Ṣaṭkam)
- Manisha Panchakam (Manīśa Pañcakaṃ)
- Yati Panchakam (Yati Pañcakaṃ)
- Vakyasudha (Vākyasudha) (Dṛg-Dṛśya-Viveka)
- Tattvabodha (Tattvabodha)
- Vakya Vrutti (Vākya Vṛtti)
- Siddanta Tattva Bindu (Siddhāntatattvabindu)
- Nirgunamanasapooja (Nirguṇamānasapūja)
- Prashnottararatnamalika (Praśnottararatnamālikā)
- Prabodhasudhakara (Prabodhasudhākara)
- Svatmaprakasika (Svātmaprakāśikā)
- Atmajnanopadeshavidhi (Ātmajñānopadeśavidhi)

=== Stotra ===
Hymns on various deities such as Shiva, Vishnu, Adi Shakti, Ganesha, and Kartikeya are attributed to Adi Shankara:

- Ganesha Pancharatnam
- Annapurna Stotra
- Kalabhairavashtakam
- Dakshinamurti Stotra
- Lingashtaka
- Krishnashtakam
- Bhaja Govindaṃ, also known as Mohamuḍgara
- Shivananda Lahari (Śivānandalahari)
- Saundaryalahari
- Jeevanmuktanandalahari
- Shri Lakshminrusimha Karavlamba Stotram (Śrī Lakṣmīnṛsiṃha Karāvalamba Stotraṃ)
- Sharada Bhujangam (Śāradā Bhujangaṃ)
- Kanakadhāra Stotraṃ
- Bhavāni Aṣṭakaṃ
- Shiva Manas Pooja (Śiva Mānasa Pūja)
- Pandurangashtakam
- Subramanya Bhujangam
- Kashi Panchakam
- Suvarnamala
- Mahishasura Mardini Stotra
- Meenakshi Pancha Ratnam
- Nirvana Shatakam, also known as Atma Shatakam
- Sabarigiri Ashtakam

=== Stuti ===
- Hari Stuti

== Editions ==
A lot of editions of the works of Adi Shankara are available. A few of them are given below:

=== Collections of works ===
- Sri Shankara Granthavali - Complete Works of Sri Sankaracarya in the original Sanskrit, v. 1-10, revised ed., Samata Books, Madras, 1998. (Originally published from Sri Vani Vilas Press, Srirangam, 1910ff., under the direction of the Sringeri matha.)
- Shankaracharya Granthamala, v. 1-4, Basumati Sahitya Mandira, Calcutta, 1995. (complete works with Bengali translation and commentary)
- Upanishad-bhashya-sangraha, Mahesanusandhana Samsthanam, Mt. Abu, 1979-1986. Sankara's bhashyas on the Katha, Mandukya, Taittiriya, Chandogya and Brihadaranyaka Upanishad, with Anandagiri's Tīkas and other sub-commentaries.
- Prakarana-dvadasi, Mahesanusandhana Samsthanam, Mt. Abu, 1981. A collection of twelve prakarana granthas, with commentaries.
- A Bouquet of Nondual Texts, by Adi Sankara, Translated by Dr. H. Ramamoorthy and Nome, Society of Abidance in Truth, 2006. A collection of eight texts. This volume contains the Sanskrit original, transliteration, word-for-word meaning and alternative meanings, and complete English verses.
- Svatmanirupanam: The True Definition of One's Own Self, Translated by Dr. H. Ramamoorthy and Nome, Society of Abidance in Truth, 2002
- Nirguna Manasa Puja: Worship of the Attributeless One in the Mind, Translated by Dr. H. Ramamoorthy and Nome, Society of Abidance in Truth, 1993
- Hastamalakiyam: A Fruit in the Hand or A Work by Hastamalaka, Translated by Dr. H. Ramamoorthy and Nome, Society of Abidance in Truth, 2017

=== Brahmasutra Bhashya ===
- Edited with Marathi translation, by Kasinath Sastri Lele, Srikrishna Mudranalaya, Wai, 1908.
- Edited with vaiyasika-nyayamala of Bharatitirtha, and Marathi commentary, by Vishnu Vaman Bapat Sastri, Pune, 1923.
- Selections translated into English, by S. K. Belvalkar, Poona Oriental Series no. 13, Bilvakunja, Pune, 1938.
- Edited with Adhikarana-ratnamala of Bharatitirtha, Sri Venkateshvara Mudranalaya, Bombay, 1944.
- Translated into English, by V. M. Apte, Popular Book Depot, Bombay, 1960.
- Translated into English, by George Thibaut, Dover, New York, 1962. (reprint of Clarendon Press editions of The Sacred Books of the East v.34, 38)
- Sri Shankarcharya Granthavali, no. 3, 1964.
- Translated into English, by Swami Gambhirananda, Advaita Ashrama, Kolkata, 1965.
- Translated into German, by Paul Deussen, G. Olms, Hildesheim, 1966.

=== Bhagavadgita Bhashya ===
- Critically edited by Dinkar Vishnu Gokhale, Oriental Book Agency, Pune, 1931.
- Edited with Anandagiri's Tika, by Kasinath Sastri Agashe, Anandasrama, Pune, 1970.
- Alladi Mahadeva Sastri, The Bhagavad Gita : with the commentary of Sri Sankaracharya, Samata Books, Madras, 1977.
- A. G. Krishna Warrier, Srimad Bhagavad Gita Bhashya of Sri Sankaracarya, Ramakrishna Math, Madras, 1983.
- Translated into English, by Swami Gambhirananda, Advaita Ashrama, Kolkata, 1984.
- Trevor Leggett, Realization of the Supreme Self : the Bhagavad Gita Yogas, (translation of Sankara's commentary), Kegan Paul International, London, 1995.

=== Upadeshasahasri ===
- Sitarama Mahadeva Phadke, Sankaracaryakrta Upadesashasri, Rasikaranjana Grantha Prasaraka Mandali, Pune, 1911. (with Marathi translation)
- Paul Hacker, Unterweisung in der All-Einheits-Lehre der Inder: Gadyaprabandha, (German translation of and notes on the Prose book of the upadeSasAhasrI) L. Röhrscheid, Bonn, 1949.

=== Vivekachudamani ===
- Edited with English translation, by Mohini Chatterjee, Theosophical Publishing House, Madras, 1947.
- Ernest Wood, The Pinnacle of Indian Thought, Theosophical Publishing House, Wheaton (Illinois), 1967. (English translation)
- Swami Prabhavananda and Christopher Isherwood, Shankara's Crest-jewel of Discrimination, with A Garland of Questions and Answers, Vedanta Press, California, 1971.
- Sri Sankara's Vivekachudamani with an English translation of the Sanskrit Commentary of Sri Chandrashekhara Bharati of Sringeri. Translated by P. Sankaranarayanan. Bharatiya Vidya Bhavan. 1999

=== Panchikarana ===
- Edited with Sureshvara's varttika and varttikabharana of Abhinavanarayanendra Sarasvati (17th century), Sri Vani Vilas Press, Srirangam, 1970.
- Edited with Gujarati translation and notes, Sri Harihara Pustakalya, Surat, 1970.

== See also ==
- Smartism
- Hindu scriptures
- Atma Shatakam

== Sources ==
- Isaeva, Natalia (1993). Shankara and Indian Philosophy. Albany: State University of New York Press (SUNY). ISBN 978-0-7914-1281-7. Some editions spell the author Isayeva.
- Nakamura, Hajime (2004). A History of Early Vedanta Philosophy. Part Two. Delhi: Motilal Banarsidass Publishers Private Limited.
- Shah-Kazemi, Reza (2006). Paths to Transcendence: According to Shankara, Ibn Arabi & Meister Eckhart. World Wisdom.
- Singh, N.; Barauh, B. (2004). Encyclopaedic Dictionary of Pali Literature, Volume 1. Global Vision Publishing Ho.
- Pande, G.C. (2011). Life and Thought of Śaṅkarācārya. Motilal Banarsidass. ISBN 978-81-208-1104-1.
