= Shivastotra =

Shivastotra (Sanskrit: शिवस्तोत्र), Shivastuti, or Shivastava is a Sanskrit hymn (stotra) to Shiva. It may specifically refer to:

- Shiva Tandava Stotra
- Shiva Panchakshara Stotra
- Shiva Mahimna Stotra
