= Kalabhairavashtakam =

Sanskrit hymn on Shiva

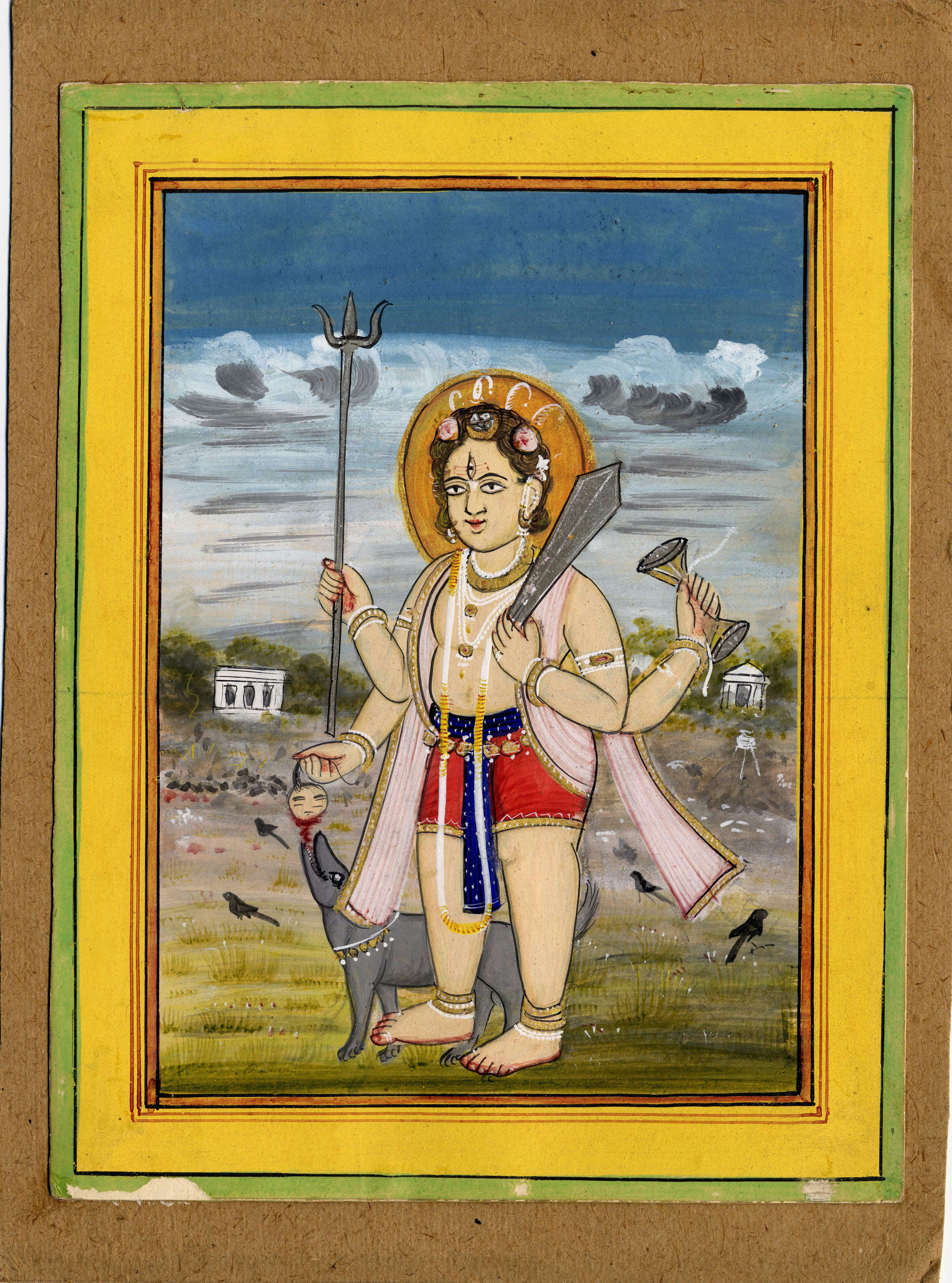
Gouache painting of Bhairava

The Kalabhairava Ashtaka (Sanskrit: कालभैरवअष्टक, romanized: Kālabhairavaṣṭaka) is a Sanskrit hymn written by Adi Shankara. The hymn addresses Kalabhairava, a form of Shiva. It consists of eight stanzas, characteristic of an ashtakam.

== Hymn ==
The first hymn of the work extols the deity:

deva rāja sevyamāna pāvanāṅghri paṅkajaṃ
vyāla yajña sūtramindu śekharaṃ kṛpākaram
nāradādi yogi vṛnda vanditaṃ digambaraṃ
kāśikā purādhinātha kālabhairavaṃ bhaje

— Kalabhairava Ashtaka, Verse 1

I worship Kalabhairava, the ruler of Kashi, adorned by lotus feet that are revered and served by Indra, who has a sacred thread made up of a snake, who has the moon on his forehead, the naked one, and the who has been sung by Narada and masters of yoga.

=== Significance ===
Kaal Bhairav is considered a fierce form of Lord Shiva in Hinduism. The Kaal Bhairav Ashtakam, a revered hymn dedicated to him, is especially popular among his devotees. This stotram is believed to be composed by Adi Shankaracharya, and its recitation is said to help alleviate fear, unrest and negative energy. Kaal Bhairav is worshipped as the lord of time and the controller of life and death. (Source: Gita Press, Gorakhpur)

=== Ashtakam ===
An Ashtakam is a Sanskrit hymn comprising a total of eight verses – "Ashta" means "eight". These verses typically glorify a specific deity, highlighting their qualities, virtues, and powers. Ashtakams hold a special place in ancient Indian scriptures and religious literature and are known to bestow significant spiritual benefits on devotees. (Source: "The Great Knowledge of Cultures" - Bharat Prakashan)

=== Benefits ===
The recitation of the Kaal Bhairav Ashtakam brings mental stability and fills one with a unique form of positive energy. It is believed that this stotram promotes both mental and spiritual growth. Those who recite it with devotion are blessed with freedom from fear and protection from obstacles of all kinds. (Source: "Shiva Purana" - Gita Press)

=== Method and timing of recitation ===
The recommended times for reciting the Kaal Bhairav Ashtakam are in the morning and evening. It is essential to maintain purity during the recitation, and if possible, it is ideal to perform it in a Shiva temple or in front of a Shivalinga at home. (Source: "The Great Knowledge of Cultures" - Bharat Prakashan)

== See also ==
- Lingashtaka
- Dakshinamurti Stotra
- Shiva Mahimna Stotra
