= Lingashtaka =

Hindu hymn in praise of Shiva

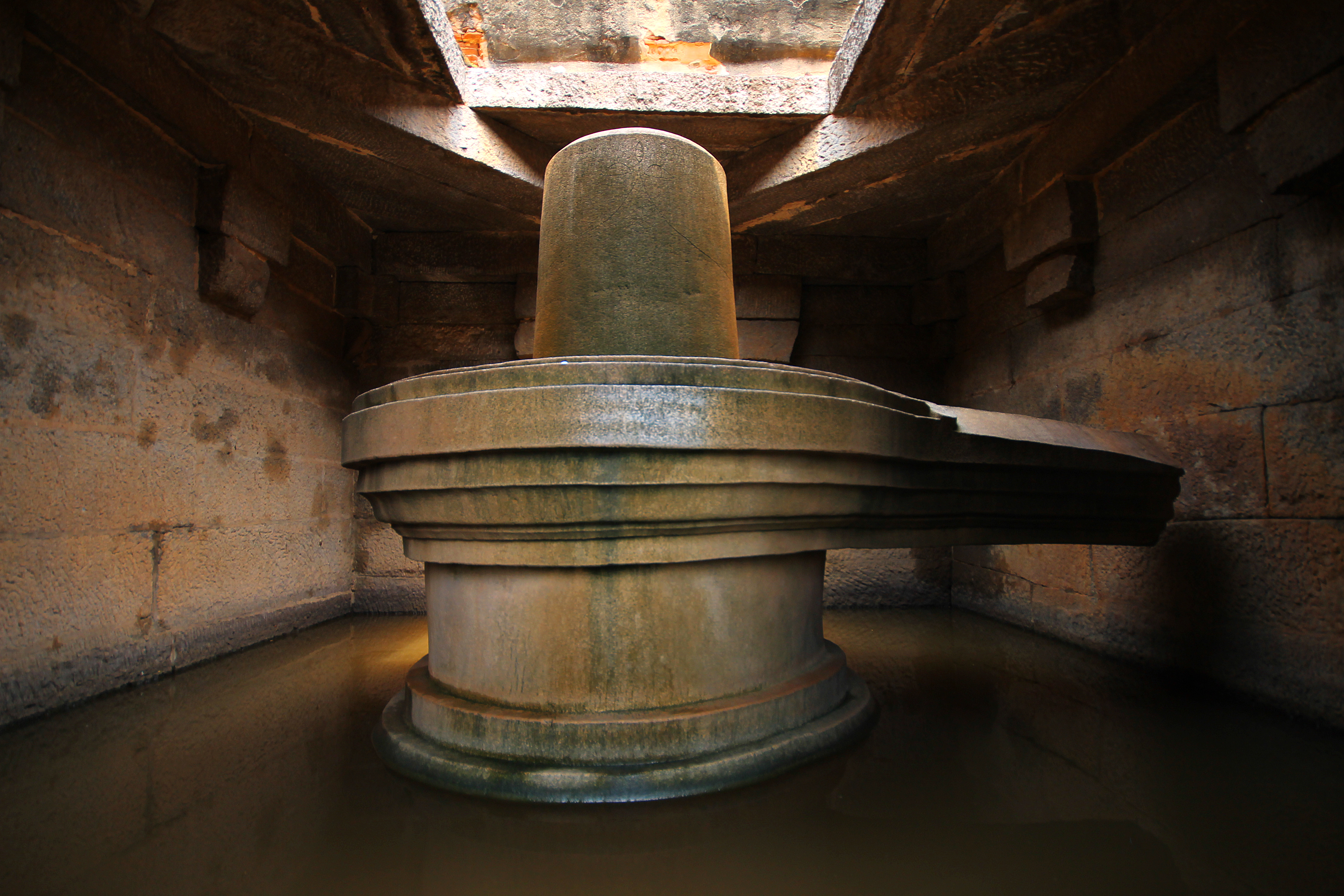
- Image of a lingam, Badavilinga Temple, Hampi

Information
- Religion: Hinduism
- Author: Adi Shankara
- Language: Sanskrit
- Verses: 8

The Lingashtaka (Sanskrit: लिंगाष्टकम्, romanized: Liṃgāṣṭakaṃ) is a Hindu hymn attributed to the 8th-century philosopher Adi Shankara. An ashtaka, it comprises 8 stanzas, extolling the lingam, an aniconic form of the deity Shiva.

== Legend ==
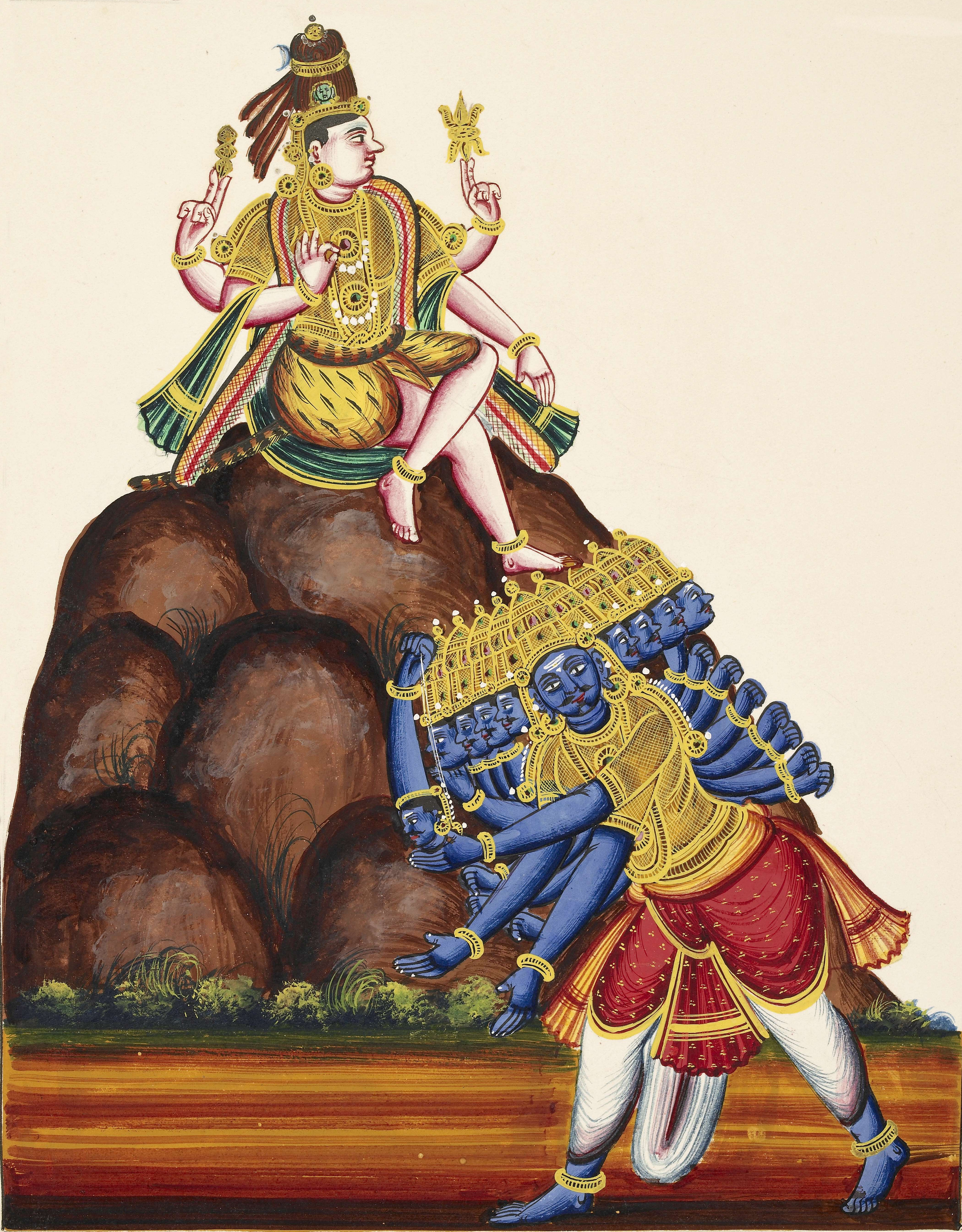
19th century painting of Ravana submitting to Shiva after attempting to lift his abode

According to the Shiva Purana, when Brahma and Vishnu disputed their superiority over the other, Shiva manifested before them as a massive pillar of light. The two deities travelled along the length of the pillar in opposite directions to locate the end. While Vishnu confessed that he had been unable to locate the end, Brahma lied about having achieved his goal, proclaiming his victory. Shiva punished Brahma for his falsehood by creating Bhairava, who decapitated one of Brahma's five heads. Shiva announced that Brahma would not be worshipped by humans thence; he rewarded Vishnu for his honesty by announcing that he would be widely worshipped in the same manner as himself. Brahma was forgiven following the intercession of Vishnu. Following this event, Brahma and Vishnu worshipped Shiva, who named the day Shivaratri; he also prescribed the veneration of the lingam as his phallic emblem towards the achievement of salvation.

The Lingashtaka also references other legends of Shiva, such as the quelling of the pride of Ravana when the latter attempted to lift Mount Kailash, and the destruction of Daksha's yajna. The phalashruti (meritorious verse) of the hymn states that when the Lingashtaka is recited near a lingam, the reciter would attain the abode of Shiva and enjoy his bliss.

== Hymn ==
The first stanza of the hymn extols the attributes of the lingam:

brahmamurārisurārcita lingam
nirmalabhāsitaśōbhita lingam
janmajaduḥkhavināśaka lingaṁ
tatpraṇamāmi sadā śiva lingam

— Verse 1

(I salute) the lingam that is worshipped by Brahma, Vishnu, and the devas
the lingam that is without impurity, smeared with ash, and splendid
the lingam that destroys the sorrows arising from birth
I salute that eternal Shiva's lingam

== See also ==
- Kalabhairava Ashtaka
- Shiva Tandava Stotra
- Dakshinamurti Stotra
