= Dakshinamurti Stotra =

Sanskrit hymn & philosophical text

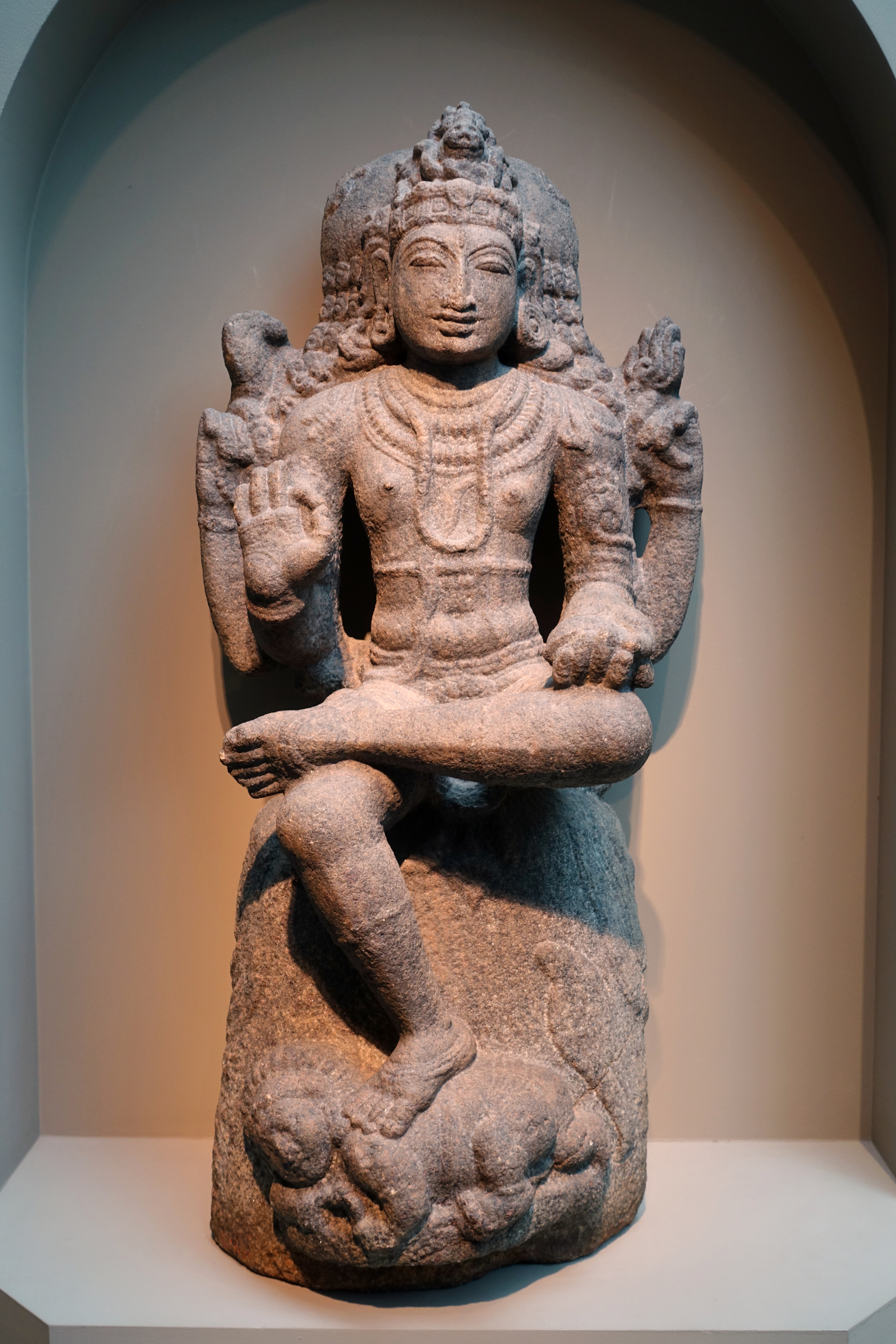
- Sculpture of Dakshinamurti, Tamil Nadu, Arthur M. Sackler Gallery

Information
- Religion: Hinduism
- Author: Adi Shankara
- Language: Sanskrit
- Verses: 10

The Dakshinamurti Stotra (Sanskrit: दक्षिणामूर्तिस्तोत्र, romanized: Dakṣiṇāmūrtistotra) is a Sanskrit religious hymn (stotra) to Shiva attributed to Adi Shankara. It explains the metaphysics of the universe in the frame of the tradition of Advaita Vedanta.

== Description ==
In the Hindu mythology, Dakshinamurti is an incarnation of Shiva, the supreme god of knowledge. Dakshinamurti is an aspect of Shiva as a guru of all types of knowledge, and bestower of jñāna. This aspect of Shiva is his personification as the supreme or the ultimate awareness, understanding, and knowledge. This form represents Shiva in his aspect as the progenitor of yoga (Adiyogi: the first Yogi), music, and wisdom, and giving exposition on the shastras.

Unlike most of the stotras of Hindu gods, which are in the form of description of anthropomorphic forms, or mythological deeds of those gods, the Dakshinamurti Stotra takes the form of conceptual and philosophical statements. Its verses offer a description of the unity of the atma in the midst of the multiplicity of the senses.

== See also ==
- Shiva Mahimna Stotra
- Shiva Tandava Stotra
- Lingashtaka
