= Saundarya Lahari =

Sanskrit literary work

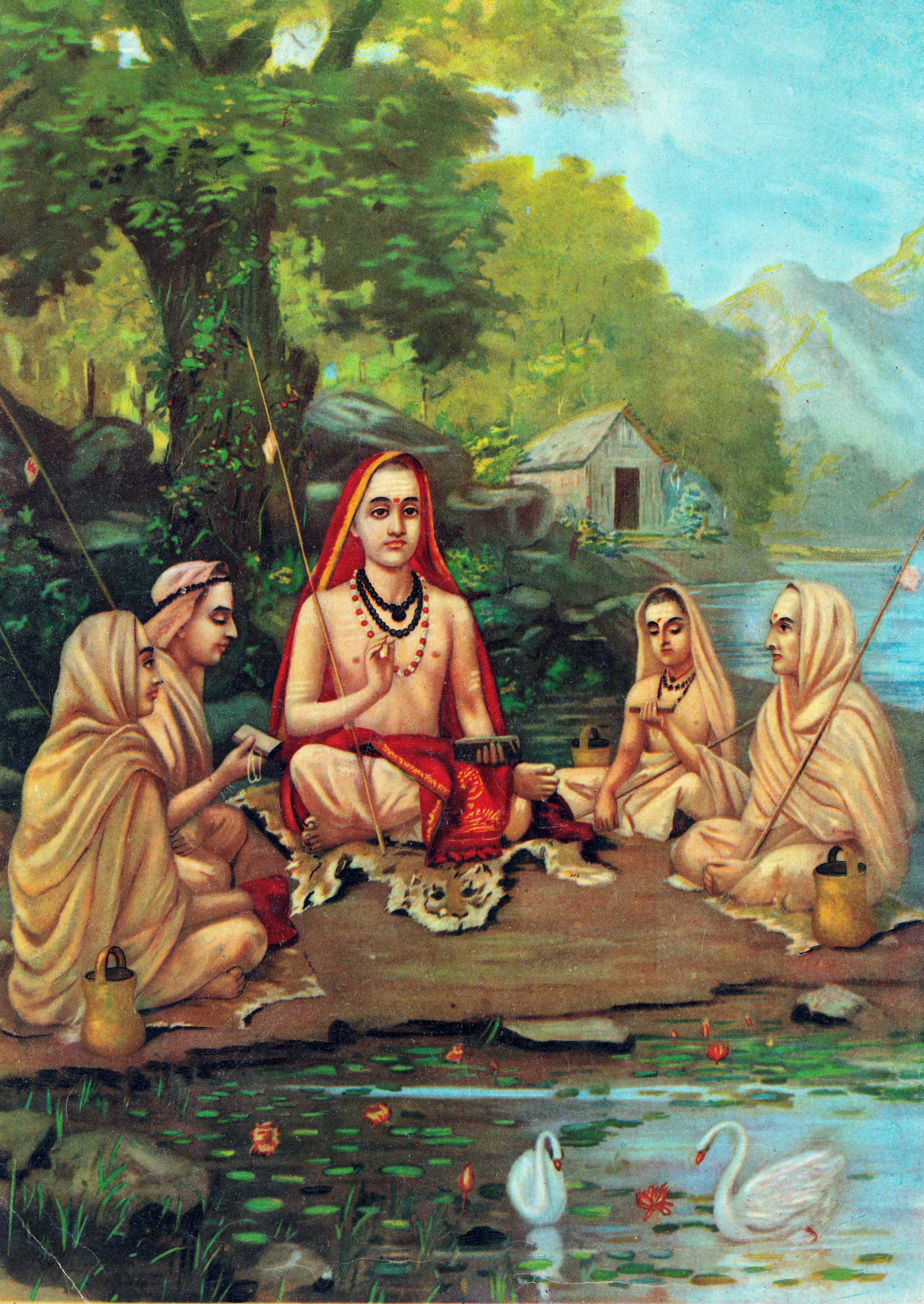
Adi Shankara with disciples, drawing by Raja Ravivarma, 1904.

The Sri Chakra, frequently called the Sri Yantra.

The Saundarya Lahari (Sanskrit: सौन्दर्यलहरी, romanized: Saundaryalaharī, lit. 'the waves of beauty') is a famous literary work in Sanskrit attributed to Pushpadanta as well as Adi Shankara. Some believe the first part "Ananda Lahari" was etched on mount Meru by Ganesha himself (or by Pushpadanta). Sage Gaudapada, the teacher of Shankar's teacher Govinda Bhagavadpada, memorised the writings of Pushpadanta which was carried down to Adi Shankara. Its hundred and three shlokas (verses) praise the beauty, grace and munificence of goddess Parvati in the form of Tripura Sundari. W. Norman Brown translated it to English which was published as volume 43 of the Harvard Oriental Series in 1958.

== History ==
According to Raghunāthācārya, scholars believe that Ādi Shankaracharya composed Soundaryalahari in Kashmir.

There are several legends about this work. According to one legend, Adi Shankara visited Kailash to worship Shiva and Parvati. There, Shiva gave him a manuscript containing 100 verses which described the many facets of the goddess, as a gift to him. While Adi Shankara was returning after visiting Kailash, Nandi stopped him on the way. He snatched the manuscript from him, tore it into two, took one part and gave the other to Adi Shankara. Adi Shankara, desolate, ran to Shiva and narrated the incident to him. Shiva, smilingly, commanded him to retain the 41 verses with him as the initial part of the 100 verses and then, write an extra 59 verses in praise of the goddess himself. Thus, verses 1–41 are the original work of Shiva, shedding great light on the ancient rituals of Tantra, Yantra, and various powerful mantras. The remaining verses, that is, 42–100 are composed by Adi Shankara himself, which mainly focuses on the appearance of the goddess. Yet another legend says that once when Adi Shankara was visiting Kailash, Shiva was writing about the beauty of goddess Parvati on the walls of their home. Shiva rubbed what he wrote as he didn't want Adi Shankara who was an outsider reading about the beauty of his wife. But Adi Shankara had seen some part of the writings and with his superior mind recollected the rest. Thus, he composed the Saundarya Lahari.

== Significance for Tantra ==
The Saundarya Lahari is not only a collection of holy hymns, but also a Tantra textbook, giving instructions on puja, Sri-Yantra, and worshiping methods, 100 different hymns, 100 different yantra, almost one to each shloka; it describes the appropriate tantra method of performing devotion connected to each specific shloka; and details the results ensuring therefrom. There are many interpretations and commentaries but best of these are arguably those that provide word-to-word translations, as also the yantra, the devotion to be performed and the results of the devotion.

=== Concept of kundalini ===
First 41 verses cover the detailed account of internal worship of the Mother. It consists of systematic exposition of the concept of kundalini, Sri Chakra, mantra (verses 32, 33). This depicts the Supreme Reality as non-dual but with a distinction between Shiva and Shakti, the power holder and Power, Being and Will. The Power, that is, the Mother or Maha Tripura Sundari, becomes the dominant factor and the power holder or Shiva becomes a substratum. The first verse itself clearly describes this idea. "United with Shakti, Shiva is endowed with power to create; or otherwise, he is incapable of even a movement." The same idea is brought out in verse 24, "Brahma creates the universe, Vishnu sustains, Rudra destroys, and Maheshwar absorbs every thing and assimilates into Sadashiva. On receiving mandate from thy creeper like brows, Sadasiva restores everything into activity as in the previous cycle." Such prominence of the Mother can be seen in verses 34 and 35 also.

== Legacy ==
=== Commentaries ===
There are more than 36 commentaries on the Saundarya Lahari in Sanskrit itself. Among the better known are commentaries by Lakshmidhara, Kameshvarasuri (viz. Arunamodini), Kaivalyashrama (viz. Sowbagyavardhini) and Dindima.

=== Translations ===
The Saundarya Lahari was translated into Tamil in the 12th century by Virai Kaviraja Pandithar. He titled the book Abhirami Paadal.

There are many English translations with commentaries on Saundarya Lahari done by various authors.

- Pandit S. Subrahmanya Sastri and T.R Srinivasa Ayyangar
- Swami Tapasyananda of Sri Ramakrishna Math
- Swami Satyasangananda Saraswathi (of Bihar School of Yoga) has authored a modern commentary with Sri Vidya meditations on Devi for each verse
- Mani Rao, "Saundarya Lahari" HarperCollins 2022.

=== Adaptations ===
John Tavener arranged 100 verses of the Soundarya Lahari as Flood of Beauty, an orchestral work.

== In popular culture ==
Sivah Shaktya Yukto Yadi Bhavati Shaktah Prabhavitum

Na Setevam Devo Na Kalu Kushalah Spandhitumapi
Ah Adastvam Aradhyam Hari Hara Virinsadhipi Rabi
Pranantum Stotum Va Kathamakrut Punya Prabhavati Ah
Janani Janani Jagam Nee Agham Nee
Janani Janani Jagam Nee Agham Nee

Jagat Karani Nee Paripoorni Nee !

This philosophical idea is expressed simply and emotionally in the song “Janani Janani” from the 1982 Tamil film Thaai Mookaambikai. The film was created focusing on the deity Mookaambikai, who plays the role of the mother. The music for this song was composed by Ilaiyaraaja, and the lyrics were written by Vaali. The song holds an important place in conveying divine philosophy to the general public through music.

The first verse of Soundariya Lahari was composed by Adi Shankaracharya. It explains that the world functions only when Shiva and Shakti are united. Shakti is described as the fundamental cause of the universe and the force that moves everything. Even the gods attain completeness only through Shakti’s grace. The Mother is seen both as the world and as the soul. This concept forms the core of the Shakti philosophy in Soundariya Lahari.

It is stated both that the Mother is the fundamental power of the world and that divine power manifests as the Mother. The philosophical idea of the unity of Shiva and Shakti, expressed in Soundariya Lahari, is presented in the film song in an emotionally resonant motherly form that the general public can easily connect with. The Mother is described as the cause of the universe and the one who completes everything. The profound ideas in the philosophical text are expressed in the film song in a way that touches people’s hearts through the emotional form of the Mother.

== See also ==
- Adi Shankara bibliography
- Shivananda Lahari
