= Shivarahasya Purana =

Shaiva Upapurana on Shiva worship

Shivarahasya Purana (Sanskrit: शिवरहस्यपुराणम्; śiva rahasya purāṇa) is one of the 'Shaiva Upapuranas' or ancillary Purana regarding Shiva and Shaivite worship and is also considered 'Indian epic poetry' (Itihāsa).

== Content ==
The book is dedicated to detailed explanation of Shaivite thoughts, rituals and religious myths. The book consists of twelve parts and has about one hundred thousand verses.

=== Ribhu Gita ===
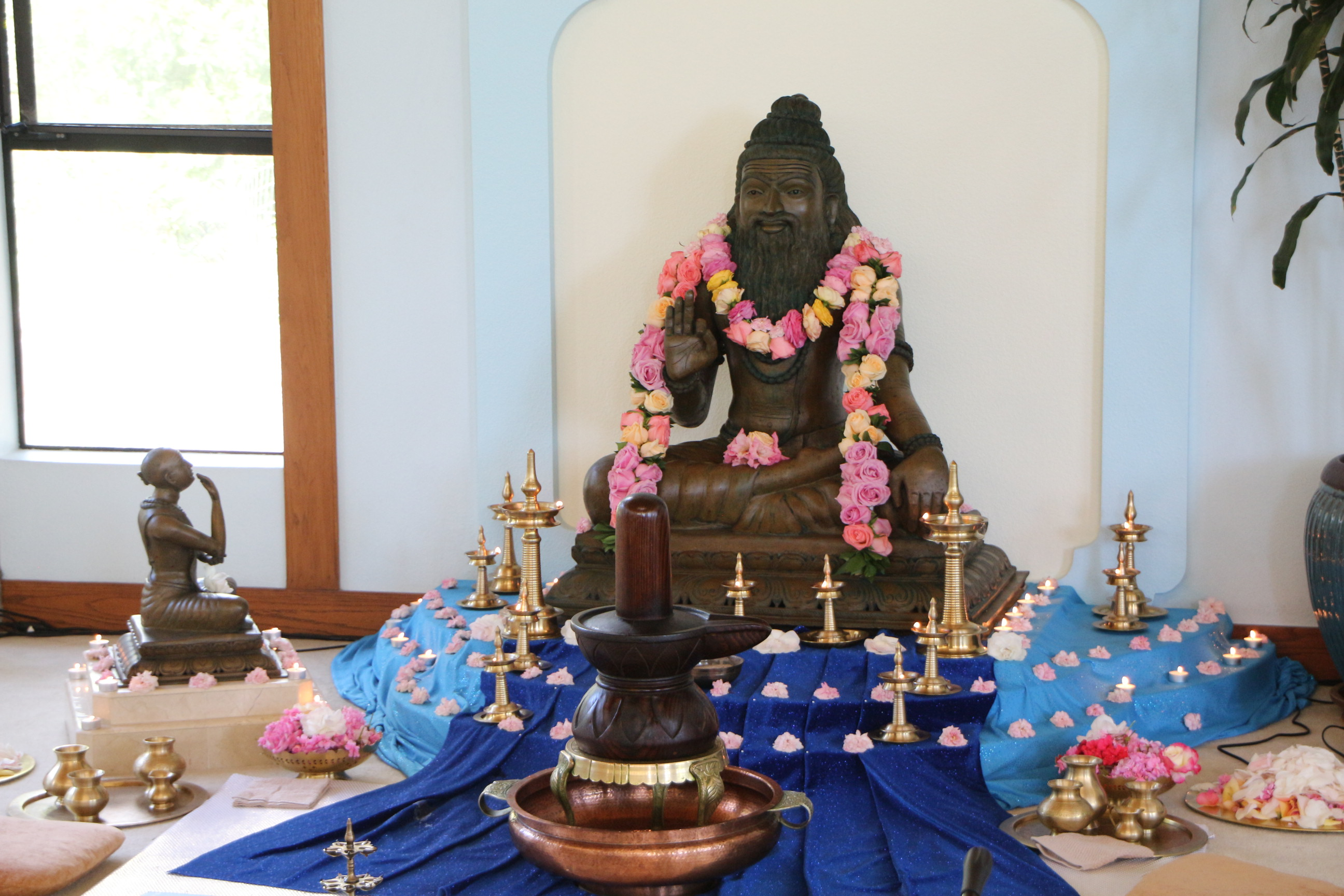
Murti of Sage Ribhu with his enlightened disciple Nidagha sitting on his right at the SAT Temple (Society of Abidance in Truth)

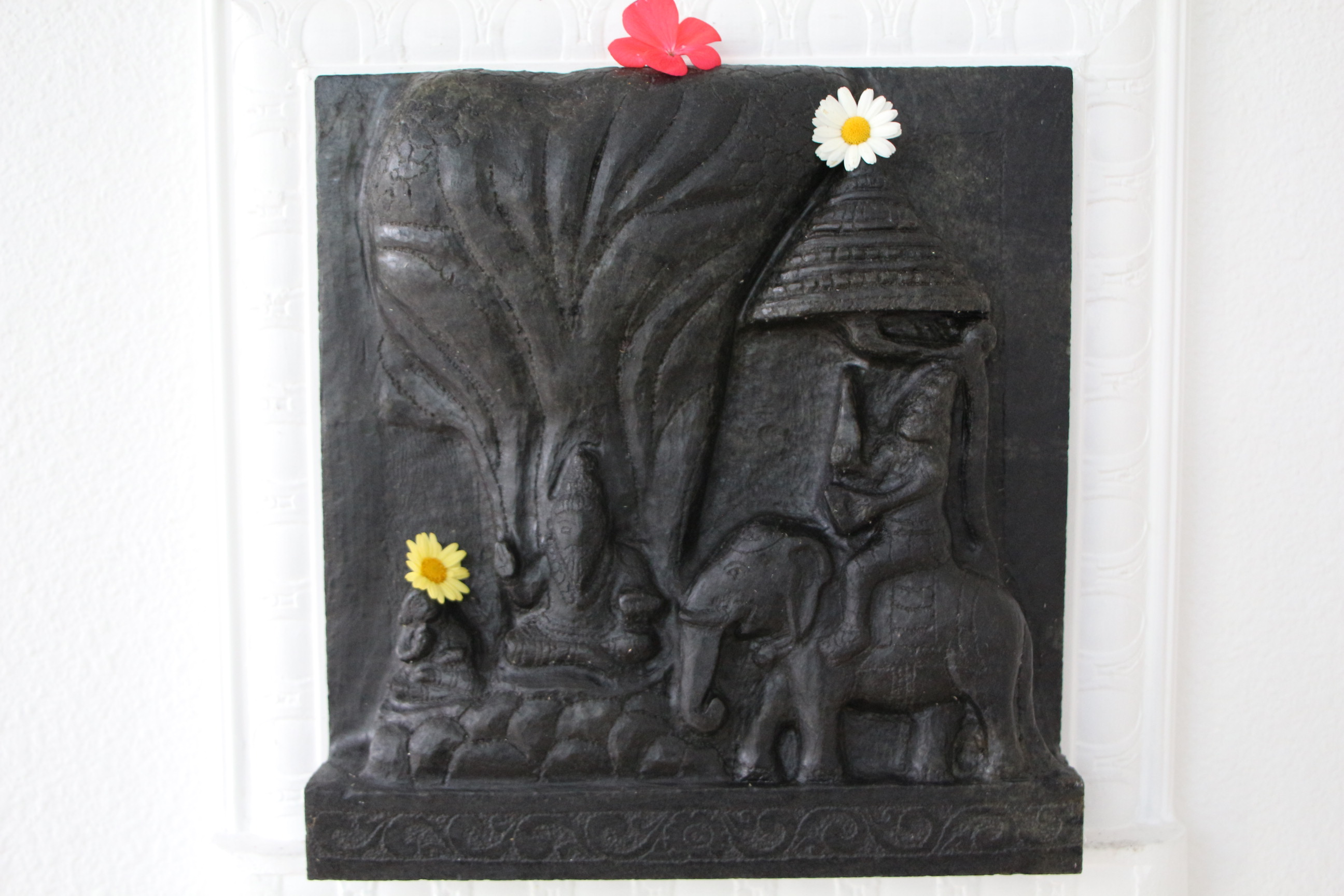
Stone carving of Sage Ribhu instructing Nidagha on the wall of Sri Sadisvara Mandiram in the SAT Temple

The Ribhu Gita (Sanskrit: ऋभुगीता; ṛbhugītā) is an acclaimed song at the heart of this purana whose content has been described as advaita, monist or nondual. The Ribhu Gita forms the sixth part of Shivarahasya Purana. It is one of the few works attributed to the Hindu sage Ribhu. In the span of about two thousand verses, it recounts the dialogue between sage Ribhu and sage Nidagha concerning the Ātman and Brahman, which takes place on the slopes of Mount Kedara in the Himalayas.

Dialogues between Ribhu and Nidagha on the Supreme Brahman are presented elsewhere, such as in the Tejobindu Upanishad of Krishna Yajurveda, the Mahopanishad of Sama Veda, the Annapoornopanisha of Atharva Veda and the Varahopanish of Krishna Yajurveda.

The Ribhu Gita uses negation (neti neti) and affirmation, reinforced by frequent repetition and exhaustive elaboration, to discuss the nature of reality under various headings. These include:

- Existence-Awareness-Self
- Shiva is equated with Sat-Chit-Ananda, described as the screen on which Shakti is projected as the moving picture of the universe.
- Jivanmukta - one who is liberated while still physically alive, who abides in the blissful peace of Sat-Chit-Ananda.
- Videhamukta - one who is liberated after death through the continued repetition of "I am Self-Brahman."
- The True Samadhi
- Sahaja Samadhi
- Maturing of Sahaja Samadhi
- Mukti is Shiva's grace
- Everything is Sat-Chit-Ananda
- The Natural State

==== Tamil translation ====
The Brahmin Vedic scholar Bikshu Sastrigal translated the work under the name of Ulaganatha Swamigal. The Tamil version is a free translation of the original Sanskrit text and consists of 1,964 verses. This Tamil translation is published by Sri Ramanasramam, Tiruvannamalai, Tamil Nadu, India.

==== English translation ====
In 1984, "The Essence of Ribhu Gita", the English abridgement of the work by Professor N.R. Krishnamoorthi Aiyer, including selected passages made familiar by Sri Ramana, was published by Sri Ramanasramam. Professor N.R. Krishnamoorthi Aiyer, was encouraged by Sri Ramana to study the Ribhu Gita as his sadhana. The book consists of 122 verses from the original Tamil work conveying the essence of the original, and not as a word for word translation.

In 1994, "The Ribhu Gita" was published by the Society of Abidance in Truth. It is a complete English translation of the entire text. The translation was done Dr. H. Ramamoorthy and assisted by Nome. This book takes the approach to convey the profound spiritual teaching while maintaining the translation as literal as possible.

In 2000, "The Song of Ribhu" was published by the Society of Abidance in Truth. It is a complete English translation of the Tamil Ribhu Gita. The translation was done Dr. H. Ramamoorthy and Nome.

== History ==
The manuscripts are found in various ancient literature. However, to date there has been no critical study of these manuscripts.

=== Published editions ===
The Kannada translation of the book was published in 30 volumes in 1950.

== Bibliography ==
- "Sri Sadisvara Mandiram". satramana.org. Society of Abidance in Truth. n.d.
- Aiyer, N.R. Krishnamoorthi (1984). The Essence of Ribhu Gita: Selection and English Translation. Sri Ramanasramam. ISBN 81-88018-81-3. Archived from the original on 2014-12-01.
- Pande, Govind Chandra (1994). Life and thought of Śaṅkarācārya. Motilal Banarsidass. ISBN 978-81-208-1104-1.
- Ramamoorthy, H.; Nome (1995). The Ribhu Gita: First English Translation from the Original Indian Epic Sivarahasya. Society of Abidance in Truth. ISBN 0970366744.
- Ramamoorthy, H.; Nome (2000). The Song of Ribhu: Translated from the Original Tamil Version of the Ribhu Gita. Society of Abidance in Truth. ISBN 9780970366702.
