= Annapurna Stotra =

Hindu hymn in praise of Annapurna

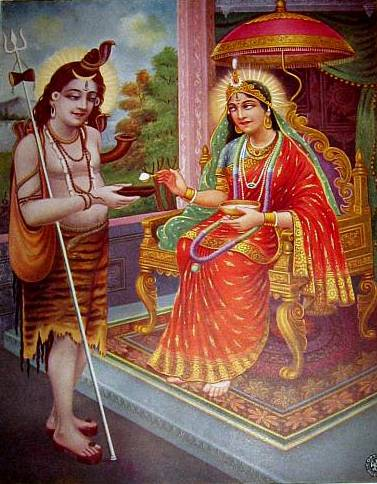
- Bazaar art of Annapurna offering alms to Shiva

Information
- Religion: Hinduism
- Author: Adi Shankara
- Language: Sanskrit
- Verses: 12

The Annapurna Stotra (Sanskrit: अन्नपूर्णास्तोत्रम्, romanized: Annapūrṇāstotraṃ) is a Hindu stotra written by the philosopher Adi Shankara. Comprising 12 verses, the work extols the goddess Annapurna, an aspect of the goddess Parvati.

== Description ==
The hymn is based on the legend of Annapurna, a form of the goddess Parvati who represents nourishment and sustenance. Her consort, Shiva, is regarded to have begged for food from her to save the inhabitants of earth from starvation after she withdrew all sources of food from living beings.

The Annapurna Stotra is popularly sung in Varanasi in performance of the arati ritual to propitiate the goddess.

== Hymn ==
The first hymn of the mantra describes the attributes of Annapurna:

nityānandakarī varābhayakarī saundarya ratnākarī
nirdhūtākhila ghōra pāvanakarī pratyakṣa māhēśvarī
prālēyāchala vaṃśa pāvanakarī kāśīpurādhīśvarī
bhikṣāṃ dēhi kṛpāvalambanakarī mātānnapūrṇēśvarī

— Verse 1

O benign Mother, who pourest out upon us everlasting bliss! Thou, the ocean of beauty! Bestower of boons and fearlessness! O supreme purifier, who washes away all sins! Thou, the visible ruler of the world, the sanctifier of King Himalaya's line! O thou, the Queen Empress of holy Kashi! Divine Annapurna! Be gracious unto me and grant me alms.

== See also ==
- Shiva Panchakashara Stotra
- Mahishasura Mardini Stotra
- Ganesha Pancharatna
