= Ganesha pancharatnam =

Sanskrit hymn on Ganesha

The Ganesha Pancharatnam is a stotra composed by Adi Shankara in the 8th century on the Hindu deity Ganesha. Ganesha is referred to by his epithet of Vinayaka in the strota, and the title itself can be translated as "The five jewels in praise of Ganesha". The five jewels are the first five verses, while the sixth verse implores the listener to themselves read or recite the strota and tells them the resulting benefits.

The strota is set in the Carnatic rhythm of adi in tisra nada, or eight beats in units of three.

== Text ==
Sanskrit Text	Romanized Text
मुदाकरात्तमोदकं सदा विमुक्तिसाधकं कलाधरावतंसकं विलासिलोकरक्षकम्। अनायकैकनायकं विनाशितेभदैत्यकं नताशुभाशुनाशकं नमामि तं विनायकम्	mudākarātta mōdakaṃ sadā vimukti sādhakam kaḻādharāvataṃsakaṃ vilāsilōka rakṣakam anāyakaika nāyakaṃ vināśitēbha daityakam natāśubhāśu nāśakaṃ namāmi taṃ vināyakam
नतेतरातिभीकरं नवोदितार्कभास्वरं नमत्सुरारिनिर्जरं नताधिकापदुद्धरम् । सुरेश्वरं निधीश्वरं गजेश्वरं गणेश्वरं महेश्वरं तमाश्रये परात्परं निरन्तरम्	natētarāti bhīkaraṃ navōditārka bhāsvaram namatsurāri nirjaraṃ natādhikāpadudḍharam surēśvaraṃ nidhīśvaraṃ gajēśvaraṃ gaṇēśvaram mahēśvaraṃ tamāśrayē parātparaṃ nirantaram
समस्तलोकशंकरं निरस्तदैत्यकुञ्जरं दरेतरोदरं वरं वरेभवक्त्रमक्षरम् । कृपाकरं क्षमाकरं मुदाकरं यशस्करं मनस्करं नमस्कृतां नमस्करोमि भास्वरम्	samasta lōka śaṅkaraṃ nirasta daitya kuñjaram darētarōdaraṃ varaṃ varēbha vaktramakṣaram kṛpākaraṃ kṣamākaraṃ mudākaraṃ yaśaskaram manaskaraṃ namaskṛtāṃ namaskarōmi bhāsvaram
अकिंचनार्तिमार्जनं चिरन्तनोक्तिभाजनं पुरारिपूर्वनन्दनं सुरारिगर्वचर्वणम् । प्रपञ्चनाशभीषणं धनंजयादिभूषणम् कपोलदानवारणं भजे पुराणवारणम्	akiñchanārti mārjanaṃ chirantanōkti bhājanam purāri pūrva nandanaṃ surāri garva charvaṇam prapañcha nāśa bhīṣaṇaṃ dhanañjayādi bhūṣaṇam kapōla dānavāraṇaṃ bhajē purāṇa vāraṇam
नितान्तकान्तदन्तकान्तिमन्तकान्तकात्मजं अचिन्त्यरूपमन्तहीनमन्तरायकृन्तनम् । हृदन्तरे निरन्तरं वसन्तमेव योगिनां तमेकदन्तमेव तं विचिन्तयामि सन्ततम्	nitānta kānta danta kānti manta kānta kātmajam achintya rūpamanta hīna mantarāya kṛntanam hṛdantarē nirantaraṃ vasantamēva yōginām tamēkadantamēva taṃ vichintayāmi santatam
महागणेशपञ्चरत्नमादरेण योऽन्वहं प्रजल्पति प्रभातके हृदि स्मरन् गणेश्वरम् । अरोगतामदोषतां सुसाहितीं सुपुत्रतां समाहितायुरष्टभूतिमभ्युपैति सोऽचिरात्	mahāgaṇēśa pañcharatnamādarēṇa yō'nvaham prajalpati prabhātakē hṛdi smaran gaṇēśvaram arōgatāmadōṣatāṃ susāhitīṃ suputratām samāhitāyu raṣṭabhūti mabhyupaiti sō'chirāt

== See also ==
- Ganesha Purana
- Annapurna Stotra
- Shiva Mahimna Stotra
