= Shivananda Lahari =

Hindu hymn on Shiva

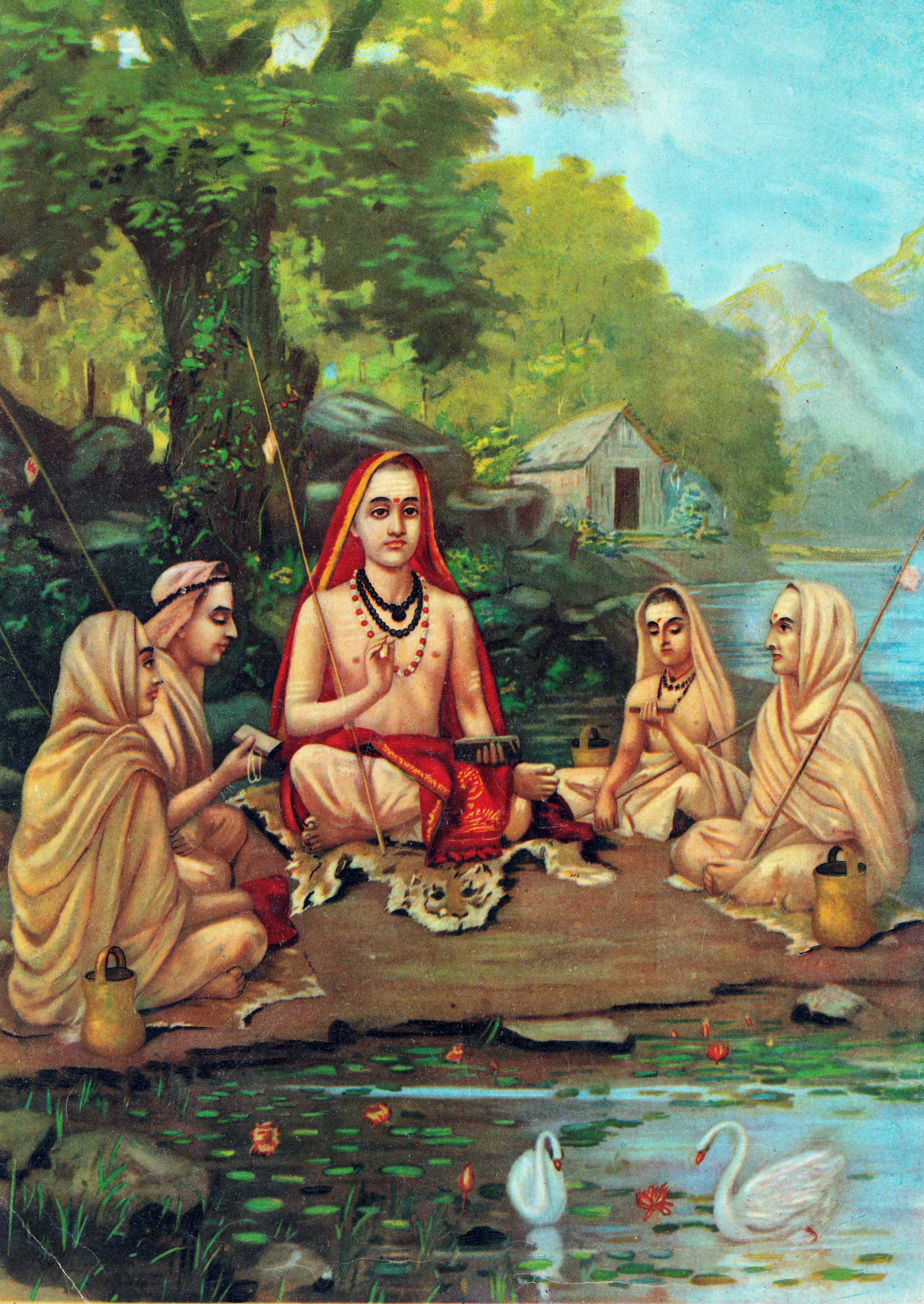
Adi Shankara with disciples, drawing by Raja Ravi Varma, 1904

The Shivananda Lahari (Sanskrit: शिवानन्दलहरी, romanized: Śivānandalaharī) is a devotional hymn composed by Adi Shankara, an Advaita philosopher, on Shiva. It literally means, "wave of auspicious bliss". It consists of one hundred stanzas of Sanskrit poetry in various chandas (metres). It was composed by Adi Shankara while staying in Srisailam, a pilgrimage town, in Kurnool district of Andhra Pradesh. It begins with an ode to Mallikarjuna and Bhramarambika, the deities at Srisailam.

Shivananda Lahari was translated into Telugu language with word-to-word explanation by Balijepalli Lakshmikantham Kavi and published in 1916.

== Hymn ==
The first verse of the Shivananda Lahari is as follows:

Kala'bhyāṁ cuḍā'lankṛta-śaśikalābhyāṁ nijatapaḥ-
phalabhyam bhakteṣu prakaṭita-phalabhyam bhavatu me
śivābhyām astoka-tribhuvana-śivābhyam hṛdi punar-
bhavābhyām ānanda sphurad-anubhavābhyāṁ natiriyam

I make prostration to Shiva and Parvati, who form the embodiment of all arts (fine and practical), whose matted crests are adorned with the crescent moon, who are to each other the mutual rewards obtained by their respective austerities, who bestow on aspirants liberation and other fruits of devotional life, who are the source of abounding good to the three worlds, who reveal themselves in forms of ever-renewing novelty with the progress of meditation, and whose experience generates supreme bliss in a mind contemplating on them.

— Verse 1

== See also ==
- Adi Shankara bibliography
- Soundarya Lahari
- Mahishasura Mardini Stotra
