= Virai Kaviraja Pandithar =

Kaviraja Pandithar of Virai (c. 12th century) was a medieval Tamil scholar. He is known for translating the Saundarya Lahari into Tamil.

== Biography ==
Kaviraja Pandithar hailed from the village of Virai, now identified with Viravanallur in south Pandiya Naadu, although the evidence does not seem to be definitive. He was well versed in both Tamil and Sanskrit. He translated Adi Shankara's work Saundarya Lahari into Tamil. He titled the book Abhirami Paadal. His other works include Anandha Maalai, Varaahi Maalai, and Kalai Gyana Dheepam.

Kaviraja Pandithar's Jeeva Samadhi (tomb), popularly known as Iyer Samadhi, is in Veera Cholam, 40 kilometers from Vembattur in Sivaganga district.

== Indications from the translation ==
The translation hints at several historical facts that would have otherwise gone unnoticed. At one point in the translation, Kaviraja Pandithar gives his name as 'Kanalvil vel', suggesting he had the name of Manmatha, which according to scholars would probably be 'Madana Vel'. The work refers to the king as "Rajaraja Mannan", "Varodhaya" and "Mannavar Mannar" and also indicates that Brahmadarayan was his officer. This title for high-ranking Brahmin officers was very popular during the Chola rule. This king is believed to be Vara Rajaraja, who built the Darasuram temple. In his royal pedigree, King Rajaraja mentions one Kaviraja, which indicates that Kaviraja Pandithar was a poet under him. The village Virai is believed to be a contraction of any village named Vira as there were several villages in the Chola empire prefixed with the word "Vira", such as Vira-Cholanallur and Vira-Choalpuram. This points to Kaviraja Pandithar's close connection with the Chola court.

The Tamil Translation also extols the greatness of Yamala tantram in more than two verses.

== Commentary ==
Saiva Ellappa Navalar, an 18th-century scholar, has written a commentary on Pandithar's translation. The commentary gives each verse and its meaning with its poetic content and embellishments. The commentary became very popular when it was published as early as 1800, the time when printing was introduced in India.

== See also ==
- Saundarya Lahari
- List of translators
