= Manisha Panchakam =

Sanskrit poem

Manisha Panchakam is a stotra containing five verses (slokas) attributed by the Advaita tradition to Adi Shankara, the Hindu philosopher. It is said that in these five verses Shankara brings out the essence of Advaita Vedanta.

The word Manisha means firm conviction, and Panchak means five. So the name of the stotra can be translated as "Five verses of firm conviction". According to tradition, Adi Shankara wrote the Manisha Panchakam at Varanasi (Kashi/Benaras), the ancient sacred city of India, and the home to the famous Kashi Visvanatha temple.

== Origin ==
According to the story, Adi Shankaraachaarya, was on his way to the temple after finishing his bath in Ganga, when he came across a chandaala (an outcaste) and his four dogs. He asked the chandaala to move away from him, as was the custom in those days, to which the chandaala questioned him in two Sanskrit verses -

अन्नमायादन्नमयमथवा चैतन्यमेव चैतन्यात्
यतिवर दूरीकर्तुं वाञ्छसि किं ब्रूहि गच्छगच्छेति

To move matter from matter, or to separate spirit from Spirit?
O best among the twiceborn, which of these two do you wish to achieve by saying, “Move away, move away”?

Shankara replied to the questions in five verses and touched the feet of Chandala, as a way to show respect towards him.

== Manisha Panchakam ==
First Verse -

जाग्रत्स्वप्नसुषुप्तिषु स्फुटतरा या संविदुज्जृम्भते
या ब्रह्मादिपिपीलिकान्ततनुषु प्रोता जगत्साक्षिणी
सैवाहं न च दृश्यवस्त्विति दृढप्रज्ञापि यस्यास्ति
च्चण्डालोऽस्तु स तु द्विजोऽस्तु गुरुरित्येषा मनीषा मम॥ १ ॥

In the waking, dream and deep sleep states, That which is their Illuminator, by which one comes to know and understand things
From the Creator down to the ant, that which is the very spark of life in them; the witness of the entire universe
That alone am I, and not the objects that are “seen”, firmly established in this Consciousness – if there is such a person,
be he a Chandala or be he a Brahmana, such a one indeed is worthy of being a Guru. This is my firm conviction.

Second Verse -

ब्रह्मैवाहमिदं जगच्च सकलं चिन्मात्रविस्तारितं
सर्वं चैतदविद्यया त्रिगुणयाऽशेषं मया कल्पितम् ।
इत्थं यस्य दृढा मतिस्सुखतरे नित्ये परे निर्मले
चण्डालोऽस्तु स तु द्विजोऽस्तु गुरुरित्येषा मनीषा मम ॥ २ ॥

I am pure Consciousness, and this entire universe, is only an expansion of pure Consciousness
Out of this Maya all this that we see, made of the three gunas, has been conjured by imagination,
He whose intellect is firmly established in the all blissful, eternal, Supreme Reality,
be he a Chandala or be he a Brahmana, such a one is indeed worthy of being a Guru. This is my firm conviction.

Third Verse -

शश्वन्नश्वरमेव विश्वमखिलं निश्चित्य वाचा गुरो-
र्नित्यं ब्रह्म निरन्तरं विमृशता निर्व्याजशान्तात्मना
भूतं भावि च दुष्कृतं प्रदहता संविन्मये पावके
प्रारब्धाय समर्पितं स्ववपुरित्येषा मनीषा मम ॥ ३ ॥

Permanently in a state of flux is this entire world of change, reflect thus on the words of his Guru
"Brahman is Eternal" dwelling on this only, casting aside all dissimilar thoughts, his mind is quietened and poised
And all past and future residual Vasanas of evil deeds are burnt in the fire of Pure consciousness, He thereafter offers his body to Prarabdha
Such a one is worthy to be a Guru, be he a Chandala or a Brahmana, this is my firm conviction.

Fourth Verse -

या तिर्यङ्नरदेवताभिरहमित्यन्तः स्फुटा गृह्यते
यद्भासा हृदयाक्षदेहविषया भान्ति स्वतोऽचेतनाः
तां भास्यैः पिहितार्कमण्डलनिभां स्फूर्तिं सदा भावय-
न्योगी निर्वृतमानसो हि गुरुरित्येषा मनीषा मम ॥ ४ ॥

Upon That which in animals, man and the Deities is, as the inner “I” or Ego clearly perceived to be present
Upon That Light by which the mind, senses and body instruments are enlivened, though in themselves inert
Upon that Radiance covered by dark clouds, yet shining forth from behind them he who always meditates a Yogi, with mind freed of all thoughts,
is indeed worthy of being a Guru, this is my firm conviction.

The word manisha appears in the last line in all the five Verses. Manisha Panchakam conveys the message that the Paramatman (consciousness) is same within all beings regardless bodily distinctions of caste. Once a person has attained Self-knowledge, considerations such as his caste are totally irrelevant.
