= Mahishasura Mardini Stotra =

Hindu hymn in praise of Durga

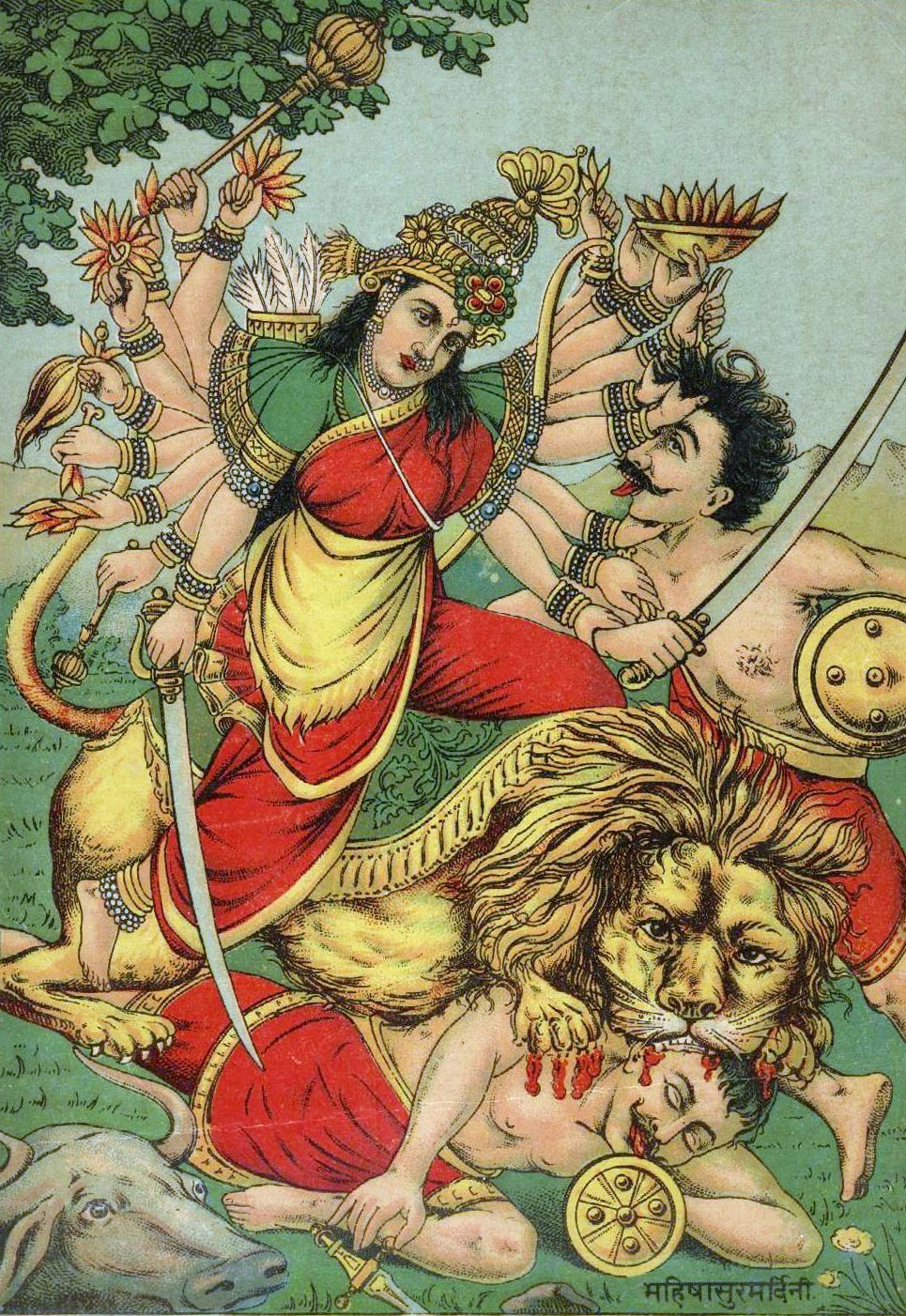
- Painting of Durga slaying Mahishasura, Anant Shivaji Desai, Ravi Varma Press

Information
- Religion: Hinduism
- Author: Adi Shankara
- Language: Sanskrit
- Verses: 21

The Mahishasura Mardini Stotra (Sanskrit: महिषासुरमर्दिनीस्तोत्रम्, IAST: Mahiṣāsuramardinīstotraṃ) is a Hindu stotra. Comprising 21 verses, the work extols the goddess Durga, a principal aspect of the supreme goddess Mahadevi, and her act of slaying the asura Mahishasura.

== Etymology ==
Mahiṣāsuramardinī is an epithet of Durga, literally meaning, "the slayer of the demon Mahisha", and a stotra is a eulogistic work.

== Description ==
The authorship of the Mahishasura Mardini Stotra is attributed to the theologian Adi Shankara. This hymn is mentioned in the 53rd chapter of the 1st portion of the text Shivarahasya Purana. The hymn is based on the text Devi Mahatmya, referencing a number of legends of the goddess Durga such as slaying Mahishasura, Raktabija, as well as Chanda and Munda, as well as generally praising her attributes.

According to the Devi Mahatmya, in the legend called the Mahishasura Vadha, furious about the asuras under Mahishasura expelling the devas and overrunning Svarga, the Trimurti (supreme trinity) of the deities Brahma, Vishnu, and Shiva combined their energies, which assumed the form of a goddess called Durga. Armed with the weapons and attributes of the deities, Durga slew the shape-shifting Mahishashura, who assumed the forms of a lion, elephant, and a buffalo, and finally a man. She was glorified by the deities as the primordial being and the origin of the Vedas. Pleased by their hymns, the goddess promised the deities salvation whenever they faced danger.

== Hymn ==
The first hymn of the mantra describes the attributes of Durga:

aigiri nandini nanditamēdini viśvavinōdini nandinutē
girivaravindhyaśirōdhinivāsini viṣṇuvilāsinijiṣṇunutē
bhagavati hē śitikaṇṭhakuṭumbini bhūrikuṭumbini bhūrikṛtē
jaya jaya hē mahiṣāsuramardini ramyakapardini śailasutē

— Verse 1

O auspicious daughter of the mountain, who delights all of creation, who rejoices with the universe, who is praised by Nandi
who resides on the peak of Vindhyas, who delights Vishnu, who is praised by Indra,
O goddess,
who is the consort of the blue-throated one, who has a universal family, who created abundance
Victory to you, victory to you, O slayer of Mahishasura, who has beautifully braided hair, who is the daughter of the mountain

== See also ==
- Ashtalakshmi Stotra
- Shiva Tandava Stotra
- Rama Raksha Stotra
