= Ravananugraha =

Hindu depiction of Ravana lifting Mount Kailash

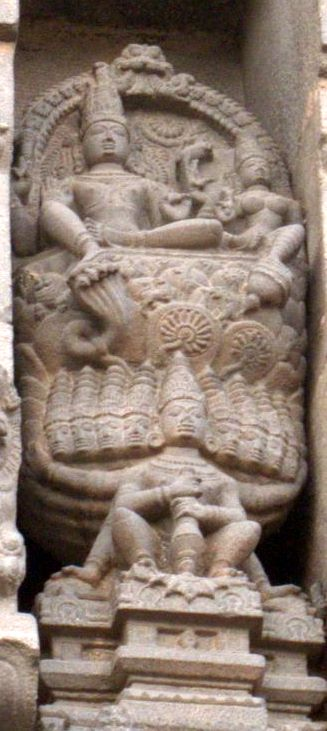
- Ravananugraha, Tiruvannamalai
- Affiliation: Shaivism
- Weapon: Trishula
- Consort: Parvati

Ravananugraha or Ravananugraha-murti ("form showing favour to Ravana") is a benevolent aspect of the Hindu god Shiva, depicted seated on his abode Mount Kailash with his consort Parvati, while the rakshasa-king (demon-king) Ravana of Lanka attempts to uproot it. According to Hindu scriptures, Ravana once tried to lift Mount Kailash, but Shiva pushed the mountain into place, and trapped Ravana beneath it. For a thousand years, the imprisoned Ravana sang hymns in praise of Shiva, who finally blessed him and granted him an invincible sword and a powerful linga (Shiva's aniconic symbol, Atmalinga) to worship. The theme is popular in Indian art and is found as early as the Gupta-Pallava era (300–600 CE).

== Legend ==
The Uttara Kanda of the Hindu epic Ramayana records: the ten-headed, twenty-armed mighty King Ravana defeated and looted Alaka – the city of his half-brother and god of wealth Kubera, situated near Mount Kailash. After the victory, Ravana was returning to Lanka in the Pushpaka Vimana (the flying chariot stolen from Kubera), when he spotted a beautiful place. However, the chariot could not fly over it. Ravana met Shiva's vahana, the bull attendant Nandi (Nandisha, Nandikeshvara) at the place, and asked the reason behind his chariot's inability to pass over the place. Nandi informed Ravana that Shiva and Parvati resided on the mountain, and that no one was allowed to pass. Ravana mocked Shiva and Nandi. Enraged by the insult to his master, Nandi cursed Ravana that monkeys would destroy him. In turn, Ravana decided to uproot Kailash, infuriated by Nandi's curse, and his inability to proceed further. He put all his twenty arms under Kailash, and started lifting it. As Kailash began to shake, a terrified Parvati embraced Shiva. However, the omniscient Shiva already knew that Ravana was behind the menace, and pressed the mountain into place with his big toe, trapping Ravana beneath it. Ravana gave a loud cry in pain. Advised by his ministers, Ravana sang hymns in praise of Shiva for a thousand years. Finally, Shiva not only forgave Ravana, but also granted him an invincible sword. Since Ravana cried, he was given the name "Ravana" – one who cried.

In the Tevaram, a Tamil Shaiva work, Ravana cut off one of his heads and built a veena from it. He used his tendons for the strings and began singing praises of Shiva. The song was the Shiva Tandava Stotram. The pleased Shiva bestowed a powerful linga, the Atmalinga (lingam of the soul), his symbol, to be worshipped by Ravana at Lanka, but with the condition that wherever the linga was placed on earth, it would stay there for eternity. Aided by Shiva's son Ganesha, the gods devised a plan and tricked Ravana to hand the linga to Ganesha, who immediately placed it on the ground. Temples at Gokarna was the spot where the atma linga was placed.

== Iconography ==
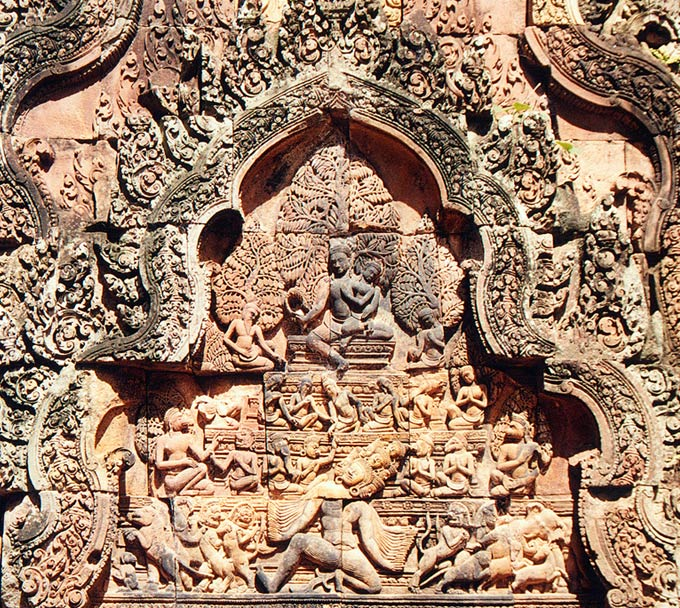
An elaborate portrayal of the Ravananugraha scene at Banteay Srei. A multi-tiered Kailash depicts many sages, divinities on it, while animals run terrified in the bottom tier. On the top of the Mount, a Shiva calm sits with a scared Parvati on his lap.

Shiva and Parvati are depicted seated on Mount Kailash in the upper portion of the portrayal, while Ravana, lifting the mount is portrayed in the lower register.

In the upper register, the central figures are the four-armed Shiva and to his left hand side, Parvati, who clings to her husband with her two arms flung around him. Shiva is calm, comforting his terrified consort, embracing her with one or two arms. Shiva wears a jata-mukuta (a headdress formed of piled, matted hair), while Parvati's hair is arranged in a bun. In an upper arm, Shiva holds a trishula (trident) and his lower right arm makes the abhayamudra (fear-not gesture). The couple may be seated on a lotus pedestal or rest their feet on it. In some cases, Parvati is seated on Shiva's left lap. Sometimes, he may touch her chin lovingly.

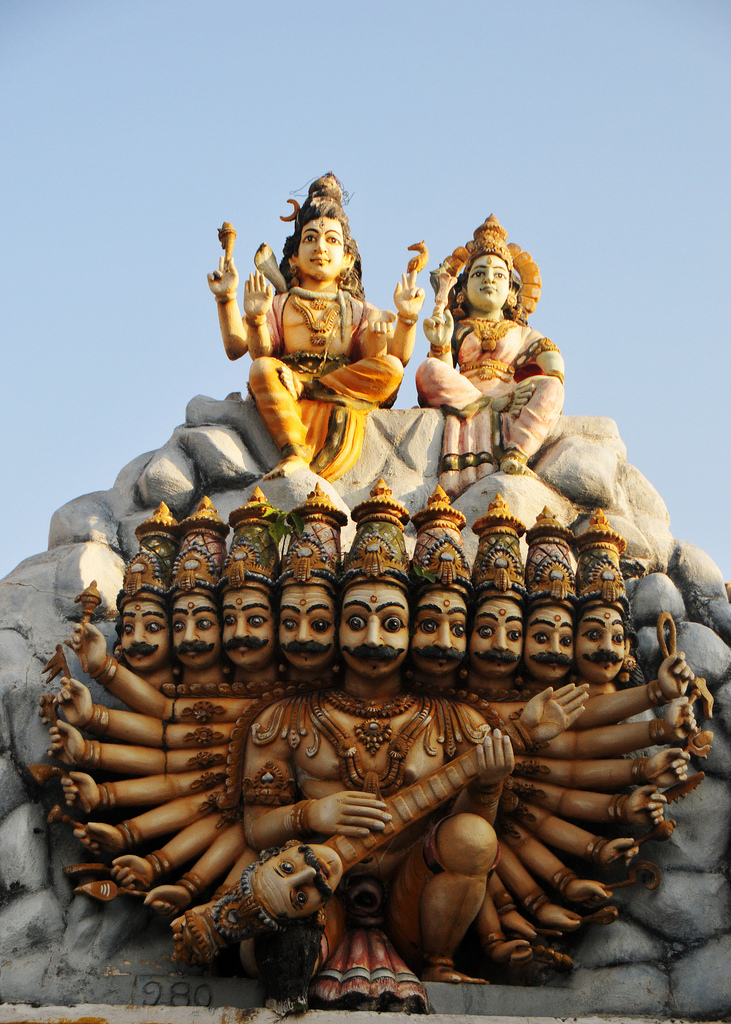
Ravana places his head-veena beneath Kailash as Shiva and Parvati sit atop it.

The mountain may be pictured variously as a simple piles of rocks or even as a simple platform to an elaborate multi-tiered structure. In the latter depiction, various levels show Kailash's various inhabitants including divinities, attendants, sages and animals, while Shiva and Parvati are perched on the top of the mountain. Even otherwise, male attendants of Shiva and female ones of Parvati as well as Shiva's dwarfish follower ganas may be depicted surrounding the divine couple on Kailash. Other flying divinities may also be pictured with them, praising Shiva and Parvati. Noteworthy portrayals include the couple's two sons – the elephant headed god of wisdom Ganesha and Kartikeya, the god of war; Shiva's vahana – the bull Nandi and Parvati's lion. In some cases, animals and attendants run away, frightened by the trembling mountain. In some cases, the inhabitants attack Ravana with arms and boulders.

Ravana is depicted as a strongly built man lifting the mountain with all his might. Ravana is generally depicted ten-headed; however, he may be depicted with fewer heads or just a single head. A donkey's head may be also depicted as his tenth head. His expression may show frustration or pain. Ravana is pictured as multi-armed; however, the number of arms is not fixed and extends up to twenty arms. Generally, his rear or upper arms hold up the mountain, while the lower ones may rest on ground or his knee for support, or may carry weapons in them. He sometimes holds a large sword, alluding to the divine sword granted by Shiva. Other weapons include a shield, a bow, an arrow and a thunderbolt. Ravana may be crouching or kneeling.

== Sculptures ==
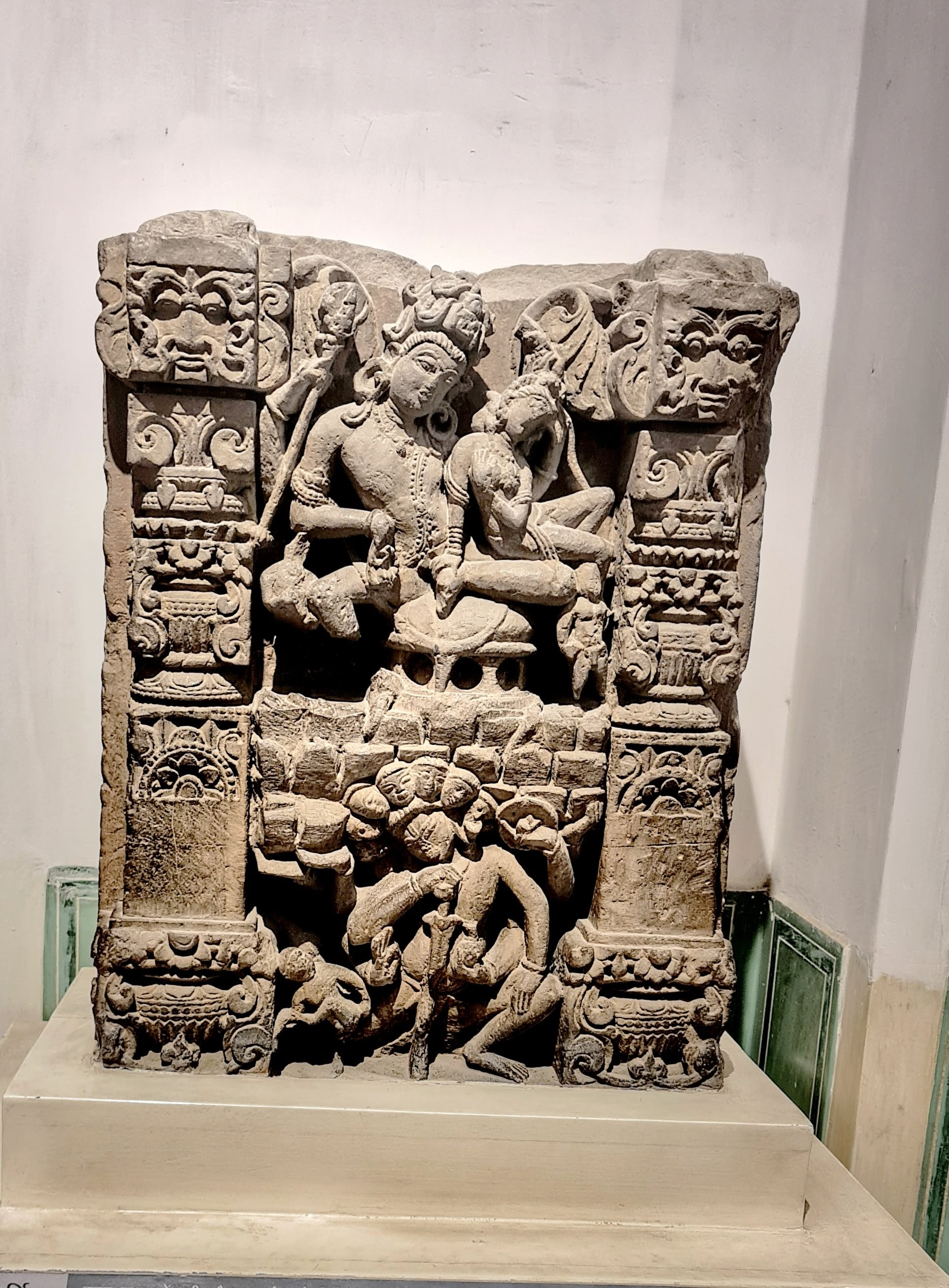
Ravananugraha depicted in a sculpture at Albert Hall Museum, Jaipur

The Kailasha Temple of Ellora has a huge relief depicting the legend of Ravananugraha. It is located under the southern porch of the temple mandapa. The relief has human-sized figures and detailed carving to capture three dimensions effectively. The relief shows Ravana in a hollowed space beneath a stylised mountain form that represents the divine abode of Shiva, Mount Kailasha. Shiva and Parvati are shown seated in the central part of the mountain accompanied by Shiva's ganas, animals, and other attendants. While Parvati is leaning towards Shiva, a female attendant to her right seems to be running away in fright.

A sculpture at the Albert Hall Museum, Jaipur, made of buff sandstone, represents the legend with a depiction of Ravana trying to lift the Kailasha mountain, while Shiva and Parvati sit on it.

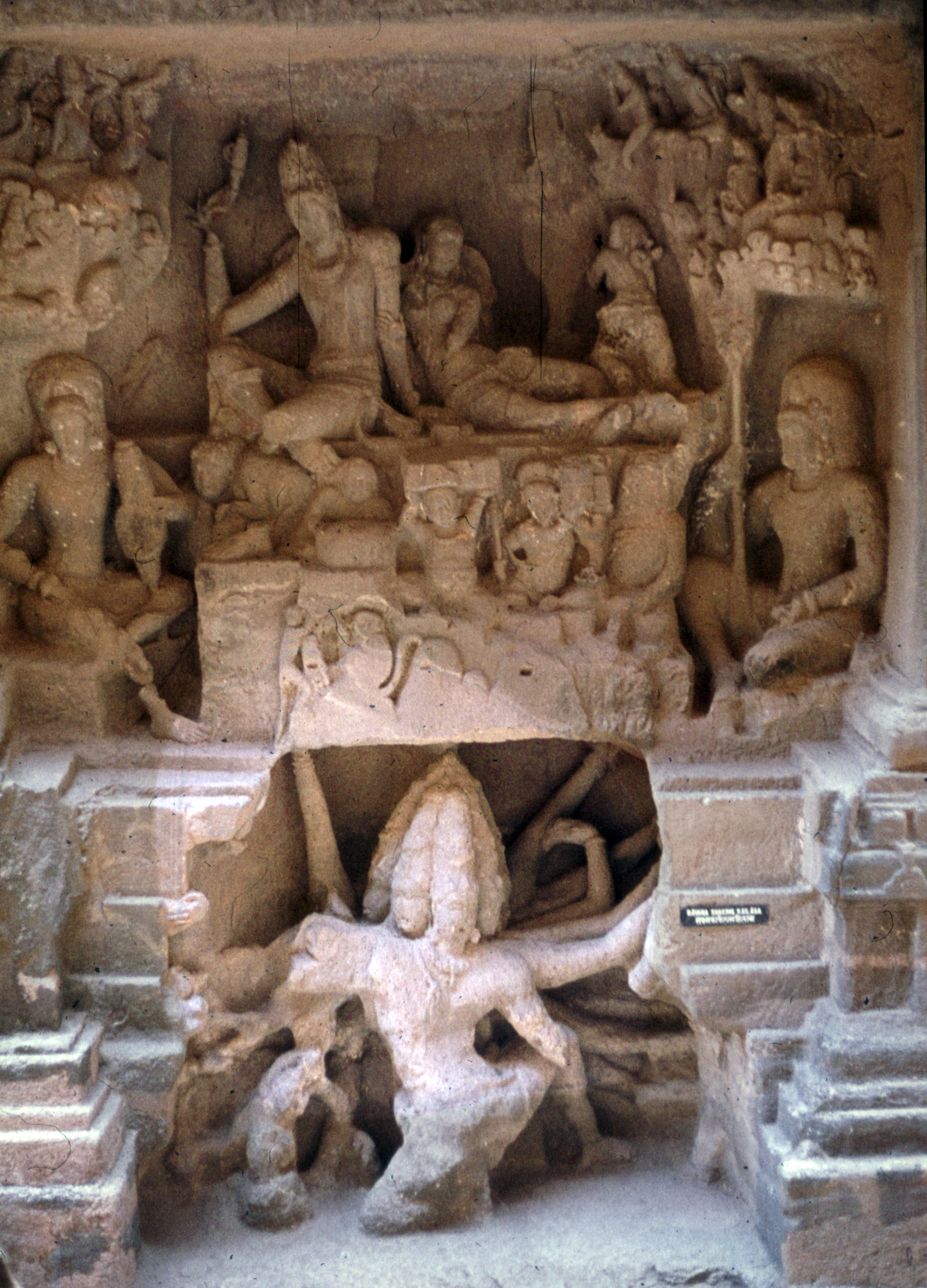
Ravananugraha, Kailash Temple, Ellora

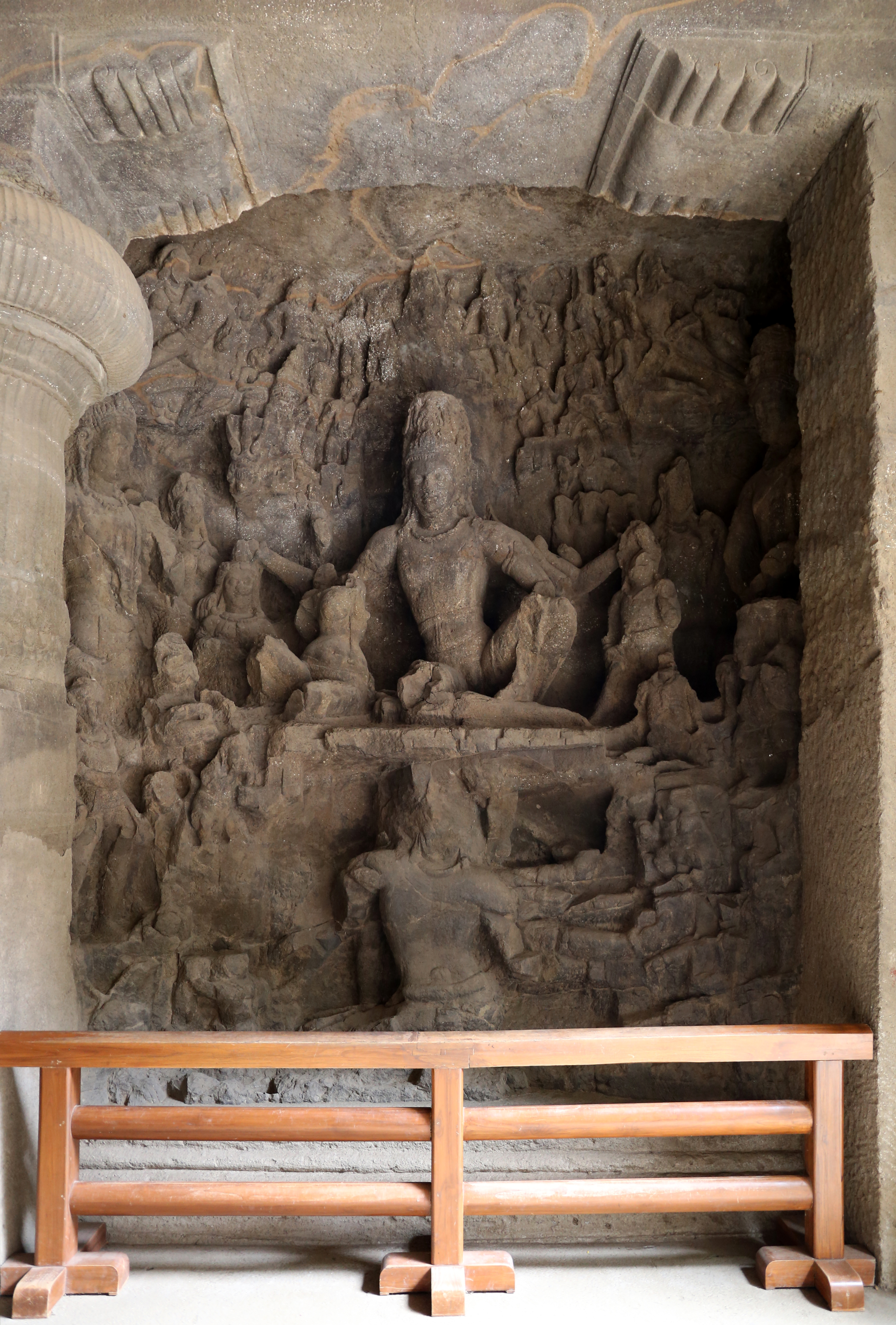
Elephanta Caves

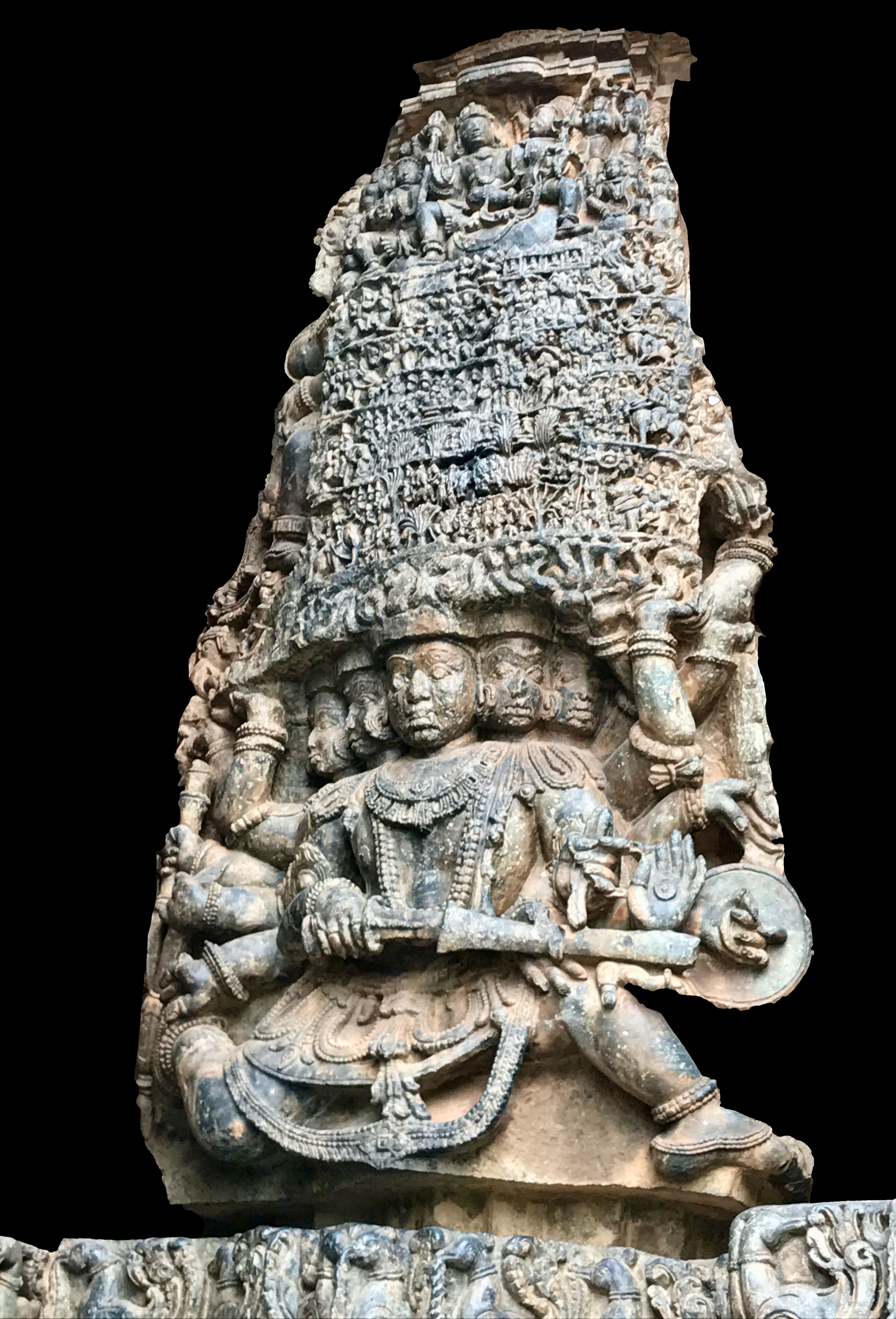
Hoysaleswara temple, Halebidu
