= Ashtakam =

Form of poem with eight stanzas

The term ashtakam (Sanskrit: अष्टकम् aṣṭakam), also often written astakam, is derived from the Sanskrit word aṣṭā, meaning "eight". In context of poetic compositions, 'ashtakam' refers to a particular form of poetry, written in eight stanzas.

== Form ==
The stanzas in an "ashtakam" are a rhyming quartet with four lines, i.e. end lines rhyme as a-a-a-a. Thus, in an ashtakam generally thirty-two lines are maintained. All these stanzas follow a strict rhyme scheme. The proper rhyme scheme for an astakam is: a-a-a-a/b-b-b-b….. (/ represents a new stanza). The rhyme designs are both ear-rhymes and eye-rhymes. Ear-rhyme where the end letters rhyme in sound and audibility, and eye-rhyme where the end letters appear similar. This rhyme sequence sets the usual structure of the astakam. astakam rhyme consists of identical ("hard-rhyme") or similar ("soft-rhyme") sounds placed at predictable locations, normally the ends of lines for external rhyme or within lines for internal rhyme.

Sanskrit language exhibits high richness in sustaining rhyming structures. Thus Sanskrit ashtakams are capable of carrying a limited set of rhymes all over a lengthy composition.

Several times in an ashtakam, the quatrains (sets of four lines) conclude abruptly or in other cases, with a couplet (a pair of lines). In the body quatrains the poet establishes a theme and then may resolve it in the final lines, called the couplet, or may leave them unsolved. Sometime the end couplet may contain self-identification of the poet. The structure is also bound by rules of meter for enhanced suitability for recital and classical singing. However, there are several ashtakams that do not conform to the regular structure.

== History ==
The conventions associated with the ashtakam have evolved over its literary history of more than 2500 years. One of the best known ashtakam writers was Adi Sankaracharya, who created an ashtakam cycle with a group of ashtakams, arranged to address a particular deity, and designed to be read both as a collection of fully realized individual poems and as a single poetic work comprising all the individual ashtakams. He wrote more than thirty astakams in stuti [dedication] to various deities.

Ashtakams were a very popular and generally accepted genre of devotional and general poetry during the golden period of Sanskrit literature, and also that of Vedic Indian Literature.
