= Nome (spiritual teacher) =

American spiritual writer

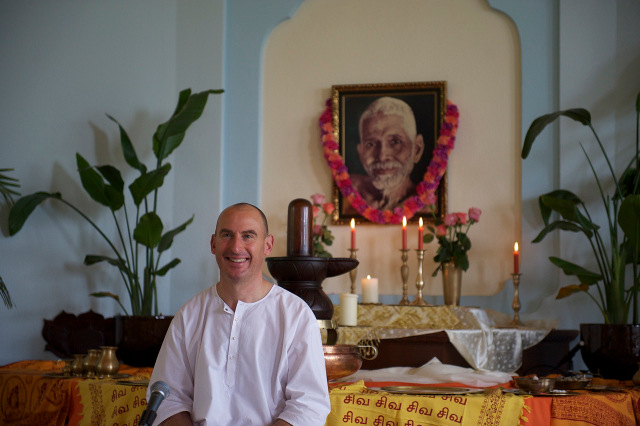
- Nome in Satsang during Sri Ramana Maharshi's Self-Realization Day (July 17, 2011) at SAT Temple

Personal life
- Born: Nome; January 23, 1955 (age 71) California
- Occupation: Spiritual leader

Nome (born January 23, 1955) is a spiritual teacher at Society of Abidance in Truth, known by the acronym SAT, which established and maintains a temple for nondual Self-knowledge in California. He expounds the teachings of Sri Ramana Maharshi and Advaita Vedanta. He, along with Dr. H. Ramamoorthy, translated into English the essential and classic work of Advaita Vedanta, "Ribhu Gita", which was highly recommended by Sri Ramana Maharshi. The English translation has been published by Society of Abidance in Truth and has since then been re-published by Sri Ramanasramam (Tiruvannamalai, India) and translated into Hindi, Italian, Korean and German.

== Biography ==
Though he is generally known in the USA, India, and elsewhere simply by the single name “Nome,” he is also known as I. Nome, I. M. Nome, and somewhat more rarely and primarily in India as Master Nome. Nome is married. His wife, known as Sasvati, is involved in many of the publications mentioned above in the form of writing prefaces and the design and layout work for the books.

== Teachings ==
Nome teaches Advaita Vedanta, especially as is contained in the teachings of Bhagavan Sri Ramana Maharshi. These teachings are those found in traditional Advaita Vedanta as expounded by Adi Sankaracharya, Ribhu, and the Upanishads and are concerned with Self-Knowledge, or Self-Realization as it is often referred to, and with the spiritual practice of Self-inquiry.

The teachings are presented in Satsangs and retreats held at the SAT Temple. Nome has also given satsangs at Ramana Maharshi Centre for Learning in Bangalore. In March 1995, Nome discoursed at the Ramana Maharshi National Seminar conducted in Bangalore.

At the invitation of Sri. V. S. Ramanan, President of Sri Ramanasramam, Nome spoke at the centennial celebrations of the advent of Sri Ramana Maharshi at Arunachala, on the morning of September 1, 1996 at Sri Ramanasramam, Tiruvannamalai, India. Nome’s discourse actually commenced with silence, which was followed by a brief talk on the direct experience of Self-Knowledge as revealed by Sri Ramana Maharshi.

=== Writings and translations ===
Nome is also a translator and author of Vedanta texts. Very much of the translation work, from Sanskrit and Tamil into English, was performed in close collaboration with the late Dr. H. Ramamoorthy, a foremost Sanskrit scholar and expert in Tamil, from 1989 to 2001. Among his writings and translations are:

- Nirguna Manasa Puja: Worship of the Attributeless one in the Mind, Translated by Dr. H. Ramamoorthy and Nome, 2024, Second Edition, ISBN 978-1-947154-35-3
- Nirguna Manasa Puja: Worship of the Attributeless one in the Mind, Translated by Dr. H. Ramamoorthy and Nome, 1993, First Edition, ISBN 978-0-9703667-5-7
- The Ribhu Gita, Translated by Dr. H. Ramamoorthy and Nome, First Edition 1995, ISBN 978-0-9703667-4-0: This is the English translation from the original Sanskrit epic Sivarahasyam.
- The Ribhu Gita, Translated by Dr. H. Ramamoorthy and Nome, Second Edition 2017, ISBN 978-1-9471540-0-1: This is the second edition of the English translation from the original Sanskrit epic Sivarahasyam.
- The Song of Ribhu, Translated by Dr. H. Ramamoorthy and Nome, 2000, ISBN 978-0-9703667-0-2: This is the English translation of the Tamil Ribhu Gita.
- Svatmanirupanam, by Adi Sankara, Translated by Dr. H. Ramamoorthy and Nome, 2002, ISBN 978-0-9703667-1-9
- Self-Knowledge, by Nome, ISBN 978-0-9742266-1-3
- Timeless Presence, by Nome, 2003, ISBN 978-0-9703667-7-1
- Four Requisites for Realization and Self-Inquiry, by Nome, 2003, ISBN 978-0-9703667-6-4
- Nirvana-Satkam, by Adi Sankaracarya, Translated by Nome, 2004, ISBN 978-0-9703667-6-4
- A Bouquet of Nondual Texts, by Adi Sankara, Translated by Dr. H. Ramamoorthy and Nome, 2006, ISBN 978-0-9703667-2-6
- Essence of Enquiry, by Sri Ramana Maharshi/Gambhiram Seshayya, Commentary by Nome, 2005, ISBN 978-81-88261-26-0
- Saddarsanam and An Inquiry into the Revelation of Truth and Oneself, by Sri Ramana Maharshi, Translation and Commentary by Nome, 2009, ISBN 978-0-9819409-0-8
- Advaita Devatam: God of Nonduality, Edited by Nome, 2009, ISBN 978-0-9703667-9-5
- The Song of Ribhu Audiobook: Chapters 1 through 11, Reading in English by Nome accompanied by soft vina music by Zia Mohiuddin Dagar (Rudra vina, Raga Yaman), ISBN 978-0-9819409-1-5
- The Essence of the Spiritual Instruction, by Bhagavan Sri Ramana Maharshi, Translated with Commentary by Nome, 2011, ISBN 978-0-9819409-3-9
- The Quintessence of True Being, by Nome, 2011, ISBN 978-0-9819409-4-6
- Ever Yours In Truth, by Nome, 2015, ISBN 978-0-9819409-6-0
- One Self, by Nome, 2015, ISBN 978-0-9819409-7-7
- Parabhakti, by Nome, 2015, ISBN 978-0-9819409-8-4
- Hastamalakiyam: A Fruit in the Hand or A Work by Hastamalaka, by Adi Sankara and Sri Ramana Maharshi, Translated by Dr. H. Ramamoorthy and Nome, 2017, ISBN 978-0-9819409-9-1
- Essence of Inquiry: Vicharasangraham, A Commentary by Nome, by Sri Ramana Maharshi, Gambhiram Seshayya, Nome, Second Edition 2019. ISBN 978-19471540-1-8
- Five Flowers of Self-Knowledge: Atma-Vidya, Atma-Vidya of Bhagavan Sri Ramana Maharshi with explanation by Nome, 2019, ISBN 978-1-9471540-6-3
- The Light of Wisdom, A commentary on selected verses from Sri Ramana Maharshi’s Supplement of the Forty Verses on Reality and Five Verses on the One Self (Ekatma Panchakam) by Nome, 2020, ISBN 978-1-9471541-9-3

=== Practice ===
Nome's inner journey is written in the article "Timeless Presence". It was written at the request of Sri V. S. Ramanan, President of Sri Ramanasramam in 1996 for the book, “Centenary Souvenir Commemorating the Advent of Bhagavan Sri Ramana at Arunachala,” which was released on September 1, 1996. The article has since been re-published by Ramana Maharshi Centre for Learning and SAT. The book describes the timeless presence of Sri Ramana Maharshi and Nome's practice of Self-inquiry for his steady abidance in Self-Realization.
