= Shiva Tandava Stotra =

Hymn composed by Ravana in the praise of Shiva

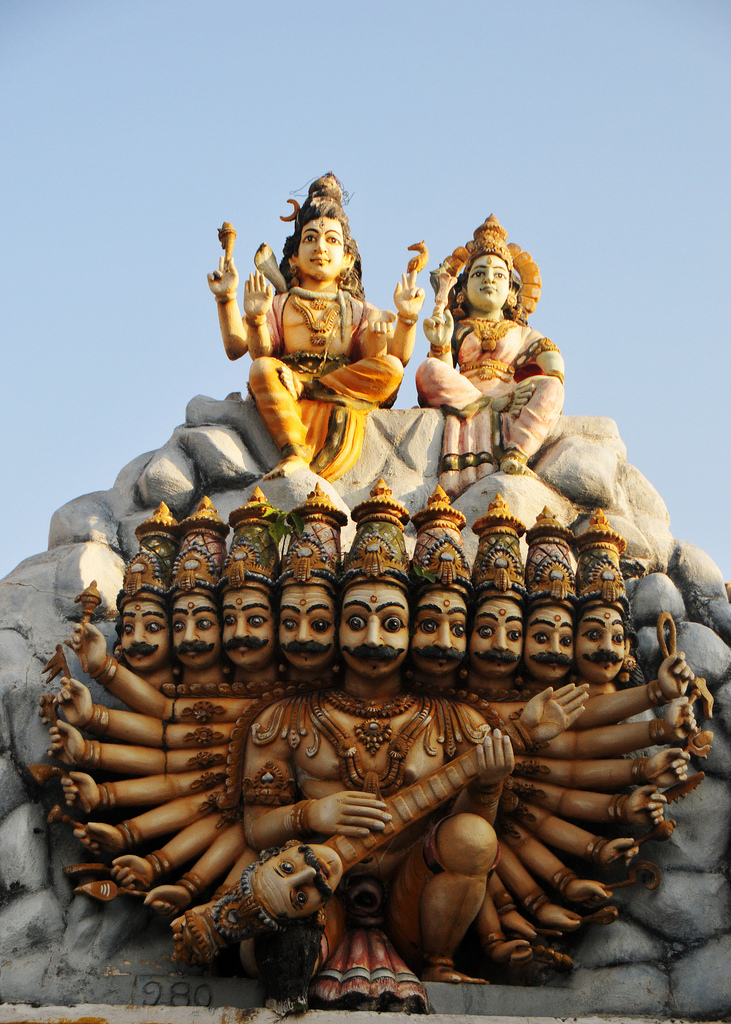
Ravana sings the Shiva Tandava Stotra as he tries to lift Shiva's abode Mount Kailash and is trapped for 1000 years.

The Shiva Tandava Stotra(m) (Sanskrit: शिवताण्डवस्तोत्र, romanized: śiva-tāṇḍava-stotra) is a Sanskrit religious hymn (stotra) dedicated to the Hindu deity Shiva, one of the principal gods in Hinduism and the supreme god in Shaivism. Its authorship is traditionally attributed to Ravana, the ruler of Lanka, considered a devotee of Shiva.

== Etymology ==
In Sanskrit, tāṇḍava (nominative case: tāṇḍavam) means a frantic dance; stotra (nominative case: stotram) means a panegyric, or a hymn of praise. The entire compound can be translated as "Hymn of praise of Shiva's dance".

== Verse ==
The stotra has 16 syllables per line of the quatrain, with laghu (short syllable) and guru (long syllable) characters alternating; the poetic meter is iambic octameter by definition. There are 17 quatrains in total.

Both the ninth and tenth quatrains of this hymn conclude with lists of Shiva's epithets as destroyer, even the destroyer of death itself. Alliteration and onomatopoeia are used frequently.

In the final quatrain of the poem, after tiring of rampaging across the earth, Ravana asks, "When will I be happy?" Because of the intensity of his prayers and ascetic meditation, of which this hymn was an example, Ravana received great power from Shiva, as well as a celestial sword called Chandrahasa.

== Legend ==
The Uttara Kanda of the Hindu epic Ramayana records that the ten-headed, twenty-armed mighty King Ravana defeated and looted Alaka – the city of his half-brother and god of wealth Kubera, situated near Mount Kailash. After the victory, Ravana was returning to Lanka in the Pushpaka Vimana (the flying chariot stolen from Kubera), when he spotted a beautiful place. However, the chariot could not fly over it. Ravana met Shiva's demigod-bull attendant Nandi (Nandisha, Nandikeshvara) at the place and asked the reason behind his chariot's inability to pass over the place. Nandi informed Ravana that Shiva and Parvati were enjoying their dalliance on the mountain, and that no one was allowed to pass. Ravana mocked Shiva and Nandi. Enraged by the insult to his master, Nandi cursed Ravana that Vanaras would destroy him. In turn, Ravana decided to uproot Kailash, infuriated by Nandi's curse, and his inability to proceed further. He put all his twenty arms under Kailash, and started lifting it. As Kailash began to shake, a terrified Parvati embraced Shiva. However, the omniscient Shiva realized that Ravana was behind the menace, and pressed the mountain into place with his big toe, trapping Ravana beneath it. Ravana gave a loud cry in pain. Advised by his ministers, Ravana sang hymns in praise of Shiva for a thousand years. Finally, Shiva not only forgave Ravana, but also granted him an invincible sword called the Chandrahasa. Since Ravana cried, he was given the name "Ravana" – one who cried. The verses that Ravana sang were collected and became known as the Shiva Tandava Stotra.

== In popular culture ==
Parts of the stotra was recreated as a song in the following Indian films:

- Bhookailas (Telugu, 1958)
- Sita Rama Kalyanam (Telugu, 1961)
- Bala Ramayanam (Telugu, 1997)
- Thandavam (Malayalam, 2002)
- Nandanam (Malayalam, 2002)
- Ab Tumhare Hawale Watan Sathiyo (Hindi, 2004)
- Aabra Ka Daabra (Hindi, 2004)
- Risk (Hindi, 2007)
- Luck (Hindi, 2009)
- Singham (Hindi, 2011)
- The Attacks of 26/11 (Hindi, 2013)
- Lingaa (Tamil, 2014)
- Rana Vikrama (Kannada, 2015)
- Dharam Sankat Mein (Hindi, 2015)
- Baahubali: The Beginning (Telugu, 2015)
- Shivaay (Hindi, 2016)
- Baahubali 2: The Conclusion (Telugu, 2017)
- Solo (Tamil, 2017)
- Oxygen (Telugu, 2017)
- Satyameva Jayate (Hindi, 2018)
- Ravana (Sinhala, 2018)
- Manikarnika: The Queen of Jhansi (Hindi, 2019)
- iSmart Shankar (Telugu, 2019)
- Nani's Gang Leader (Telugu, 2019)
- Pattas (Tamil, 2020)
- Ramayana: Part 1 (Hindi, 2026)

== See also ==
- Shiva Mahimna Stotra
- Shiva Stuti
- Mahishasura Mardini Stotra
- Tandava
