= Society of Abidance in Truth =

Spiritual organization

Coordinates: 36.9887°N 122.0267°W

The Society of Abidance in Truth (SAT) is a spiritual nonprofit organization (501(c)(3)) consecrated to the teachings of Advaita Vedanta, especially as revealed by Ramana Maharshi.

Siva Lingam and Sri Ramana Maharshi after puja during 2012 Self-Knowledge Retreat at SAT Temple

== Publications ==
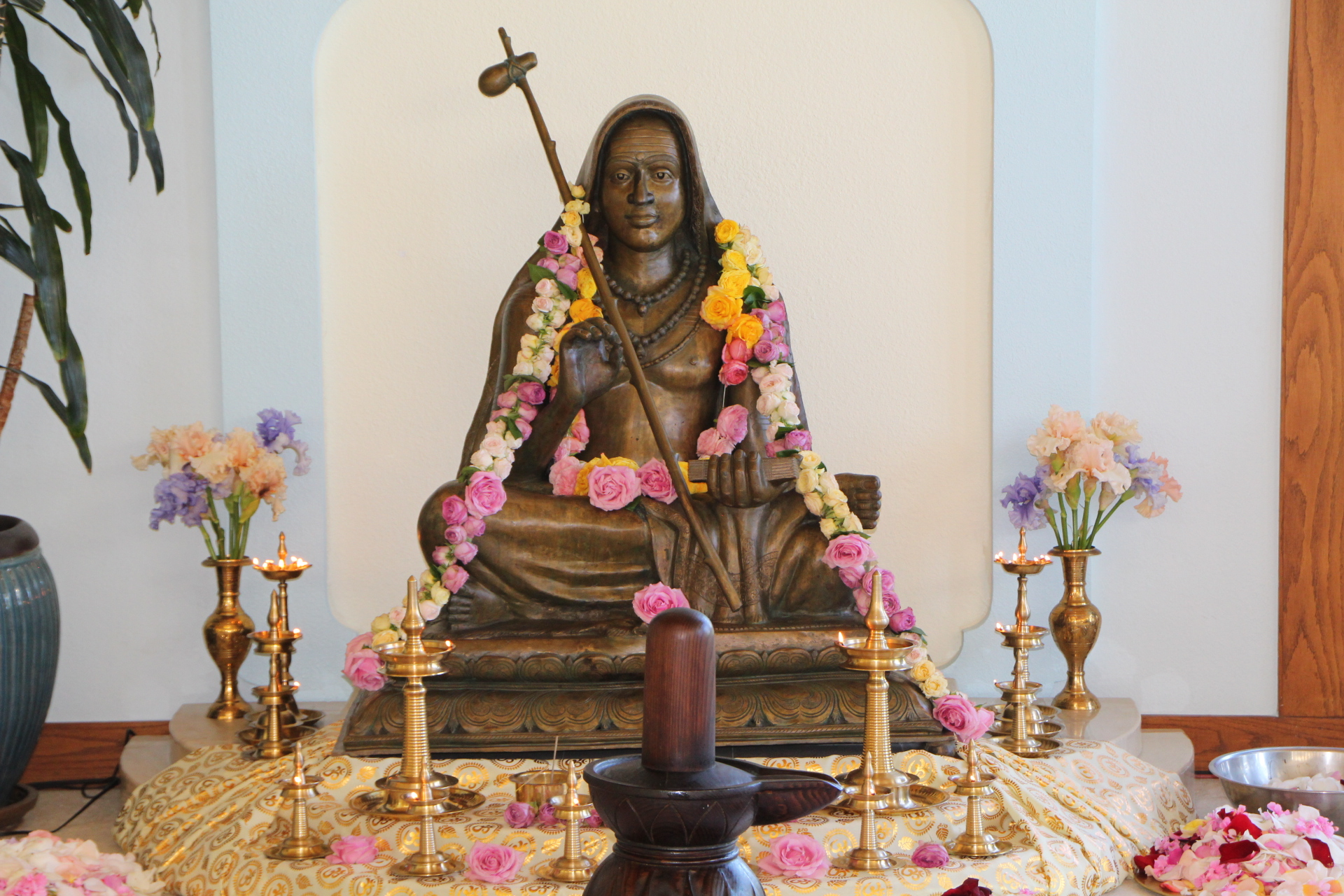
Murti of Adi Sankara at the SAT Temple

The Society of Abidance in Truth has published English translations of works such as the Ribhu Gita, an essential and classic work of Advaita Vedanta. The translation has since then been re-published by Sri Ramanasramam (Tiruvannamalai, India) and translated into Hindi, Italian, Korean, and German. Below is the list of their current publications:

- The Ribhu Gita, Translated by Dr. H. Ramamoorthy and Nome, Second Edition 2017, ISBN 978-1-9471540-0-1: This is the second edition of the English translation from the original Sanskrit epic Sivarahasyam.
- The Ribhu Gita, Translated by Dr. H. Ramamoorthy and Nome, First Edition 1995, ISBN 978-0-9703667-4-0: This is the English translation from the original Sanskrit epic Sivarahasyam.
- The Song of Ribhu, Translated by Dr. H. Ramamoorthy and Nome, 2000, ISBN 978-0-9703667-0-2: This is the English translation of the Tamil Ribhu Gita.
- The Song of Ribhu Audiobook: Chapters 1 through 11, Reading in English by Nome accompanied by soft vina music by Zia Mohiuddin Dagar (Rudra vina, Raga Yaman), ISBN 978-0-9819409-1-5
- Nirguna Manasa Puja: Worship of the Attributeless one in the Mind, by Adi Sankara, Translated by Dr. H. Ramamoorthy and Nome, 2024, Second Edition, ISBN 978-1-9471543-5-3
- Nirguna Manasa Puja: Worship of the Attributeless one in the Mind, by Adi Sankara, Translated by Dr. H. Ramamoorthy and Nome, 1993, First Edition,ISBN 978-0-9703667-5-7
- Svatmanirupanam, by Adi Sankara, Translated by Dr. H. Ramamoorthy and Nome, 2002, ISBN 978-0-9703667-1-9
- Nirvana-Satkam, by Adi Sankaracarya, Translated by Nome, 2004, ISBN 978-0-9703667-6-4
- A Bouquet of Nondual Texts, by Adi Sankara, Translated by Dr. H. Ramamoorthy and Nome, 2006, ISBN 978-0-9703667-2-6
- Origin of Spiritual Instruction, by Bhagavan Sri Ramana Maharshi, 2006, ISBN 978-0-9703667-3-3
- Timeless Presence, by Nome, 2003, ISBN 978-0-9703667-7-1
- Four Requisites for Realization and Self-Inquiry, by Nome, 2003, ISBN 978-0-9703667-6-4
- Saddarsanam and An Inquiry into the Revelation of Truth and Oneself, by Sri Ramana Maharshi, Translation and Commentary by Nome, 2009, ISBN 978-0-9819409-0-8
- Advaita Devatam: God of Nonduality, Edited by Nome, 2009, ISBN 978-0-9703667-9-5
- Poetry from Advaita Devatam (Audio CD), Recitation by Nome, Vocals by Sasvati, Vina by Jayalakshmi Sekhar and E. Gayatri, ISBN 978-0-9819409-2-2
- The Essence of the Spiritual Instruction, by Bhagavan Sri Ramana Maharshi, Translated with Commentary by Nome, 2011, ISBN 978-0-9819409-3-9
- The Quintessence of True Being, by Nome, 2011, ISBN 978-0-9819409-4-6
- Ever Yours In Truth, by Nome, 2015, ISBN 978-0-9819409-6-0
- One Self, by Nome, 2015, ISBN 978-0-9819409-7-7
- Parabhakti, by Nome, 2015, ISBN 978-0-9819409-8-4
- Self-Realization, by Bhagavan Sri Ramana Maharshi, First Reprint 1996, Second Reprint 2016, With the kind permission of Sri Ramanasramam, Tiruvannamalai, India, ISBN 978-0-9819409-5-3
- Hastamalakiyam: A Fruit in the Hand or A Work by Hastamalaka, by Adi Sankara and Sri Ramana Maharshi, Translated by Dr. H. Ramamoorthy and Nome, 2017, ISBN 978-0-9819409-9-1
- Essence of Inquiry: Vicharasangraham, A Commentary by Nome, by Sri Ramana Maharshi, Gambhiram Seshayya, Nome, Second Edition 2019. ISBN 978-19471540-1-8
- Five Flowers of Self-Knowledge: Atma-Vidya, Atma-Vidya of Bhagavan Sri Ramana Maharshi with explanation by Nome, 2019, ISBN 978-1-9471540-6-3
- The Light of Wisdom, A commentary on selected verses from Sri Ramana Maharshi’s Supplement of the Forty Verses on Reality and Five Verses on the One Self (Ekatma Panchakam) by Nome, 2020, ISBN 978-1-9471541-9-3

The Society of Abidance in Truth also publishes a quarterly online journal called Reflections containing transcripts of Satsangs given by Nome, the teachings of Sri Ramana Maharshi, excerpts from The Ramana Way (the journal of Ramana Maharshi Centre for Learning), and excerpts from other Advaitic scriptures.

== Temple ==
The Society of Abidance in Truth, also known as SAT Temple, is located in Santa Cruz, California. Spiritual events, such as Satsangs and retreats, are held in the temple throughout the year. Spiritual guidance is provided by Nome, who practiced self-inquiry for steady abidance in Self-Realization.

== See also ==
- List of Hindu temples in the United States
- List of Hindu temples outside India
