= Shiva Mahimna Stotra =

Hindu hymn

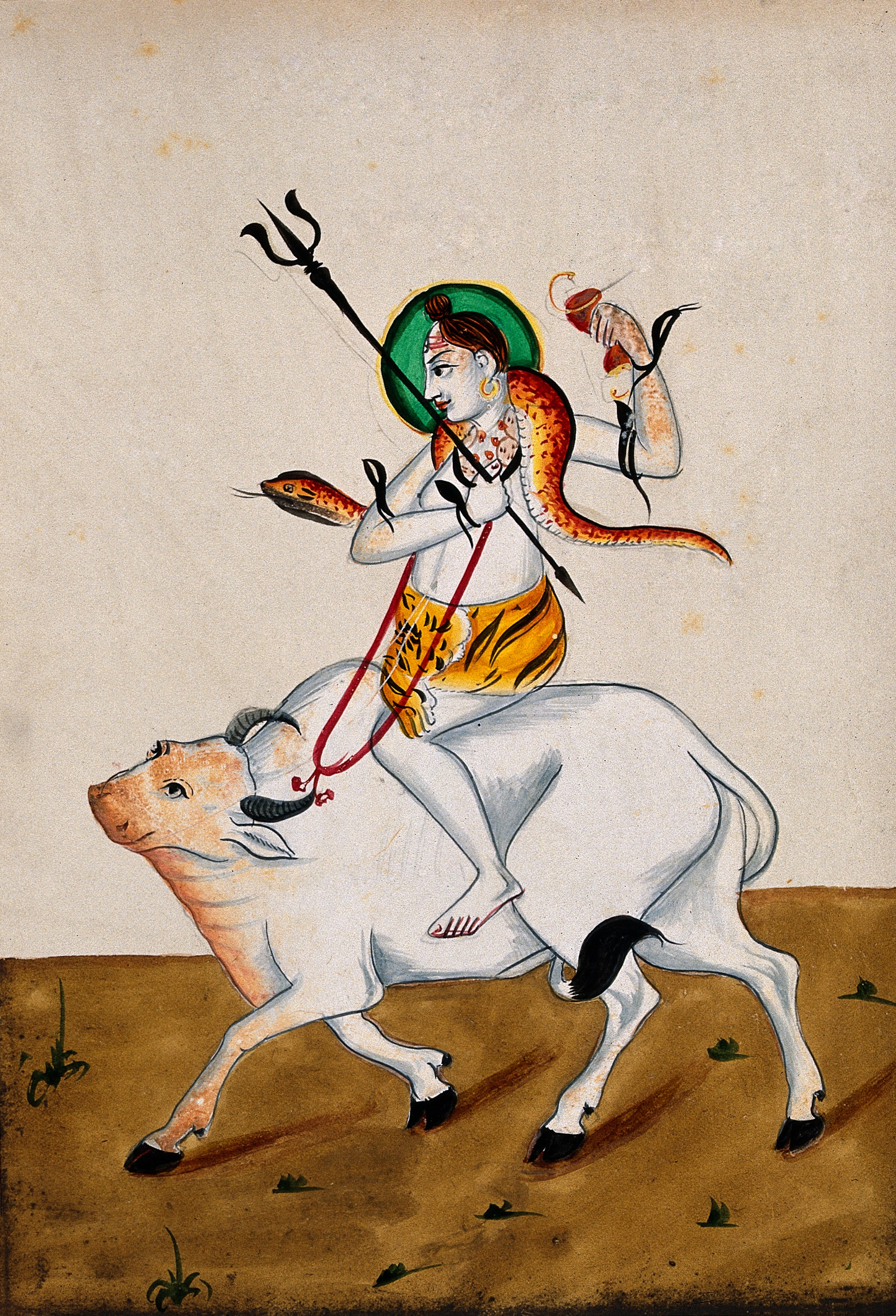
Shiva, the addressee of this hymn, riding his mount Nandi

The Shiva Mahimna Stotra (Sanskrit: शिवमहिम्न:स्तोत्र, romanized: śiva-mahimnaḥ stotra, lit. 'Hymn about the greatness of Shiva') is a Sanskrit composition (stotra) in praise of Shiva. According to tradition, the hymn is believed to have been composed by a gandharva (celestial musician) named Pushpadanta. The hymn lists Shiva's various achievements and qualities.

== Legend ==
Pushpadanta, the chief of the gandharvas, had the habit of stealing flowers for the worship of Shiva from the garden of King Vahu. Possessing the ability to walk upon the air, the gandharva entered the garden by night. Unseen by the keepers of the garden, he collected a large number of flowers for the veneration of the deity in the morning. First perplexed by this event, the keepers eventually deduced the ability of the thief. They hatched a plan to place flowers sacred to Shiva (bilva leaves in other accounts) in several locations of the garden, hoping that the intruder would tread upon them in the dark and be cursed by the deity to lose his ability and foil his crime. Accordingly, Pushpadanta walked upon the flowers and lost his ability to walk upon the air. Caught and arrested, the gandharva sang the Shiva Mahimna Stotra to the angered king when he was brought to him in repentance.

In a variation of this legend, pleased with the recitation of the hymn, Shiva absolved the gandharva of his crime and restored his powers.

== Hymn ==
The first stanza of the hymn extols the greatness of Shiva:

mahimnaḥ pāraṁ te paramaviduṣo yadyasadṛśī
stutir brahmādīnām api tadavasan nāstvayi giraḥ
athāvācyaḥ sarvaḥ svam atiparimāṇāv adhigṛṇan
mamāpy eṣa stotre hara nirapavādaḥ parikaraḥ

O Shiva, remover of all types of miseries, what wonder is there, if the prayer to you, chanted by one who is ignorant about your greatness, is worthless! Even the utterance of Brahma and other gods is not able to fathom your merits. Hence, if persons with very limited intellect try to offer you a prayer, their attempt deserve your special favour. If it is so, I should not be an exception. Hence, I begin this prayer.

The following additional verses further illustrate the spiritual and poetic depth of the Shiva Mahimna Stotram.

atītaḥ panthānaṃ tava ca mahimā vāṅmanasayoḥ
atadvyāvṛttyā yaṃ cakitam abhidhatte śrutir api
sa kasya stotavyaḥ katividhaguṇaḥ kasya viśhayaḥ
pade tvarvācīne patati na manaḥ kasya na vacaḥ ॥ 2॥

O Lord Shiva, Your greatness lies beyond the reach of speech and mind. Even the Vedas, in awe, describe You only through negation — saying “Not this, not this” (Neti Neti). Who then can truly praise You, or grasp the infinite qualities that belong to You? When even the highest intellect falls short, how can mind or words ever reach the depth of Your glory?

madhusphītā vācaḥ paramam amṛtaṃ nirmitavat
stava brahman kiṃ vāg api suraguror vismayapadam
mama tvetāṃ vāṇīṃ guṇakathanapuṇyena bhavataḥ
punām ity arthe’smin puram athan buddhiḥ vyavasitā॥ 3॥

O Lord Shiva! You are the creator of the nectar-like Vedas. Can even the speech of Brihaspati, the teacher of the Devas, amaze You? O destroyer of the three cities, I undertake this hymn so that my words may be purified by praising Your glory. Even if the praises of Brahma and other deities cannot reach Your greatness, what can an ignorant being like me say? Yet may my humble speech be accepted, O Shiva, whose greatness transcends words and thought.

tavaiścaryaṃ yat taj jagadudaya rakṣā pralayakṛt
trayī vastu vyastaṃ tisṛṣu guṇabhinnāsu tanuṣu
abhavyānām asmin varada ramaṇīyāmaramaṇīṃ
vihantuṃ vyākrośīṃ vidadhatiha ike jaḍadhiyaḥ॥ 4॥

O Giver of boons! Some deluded people argue against Your divinity that creates, preserves and destroys the world through the three forms arising from the three guṇas, as described in the three Vedas. Yet even the worldly-minded, when they fall at Your feet, are freed from sorrow. Your divine acts remain beyond ordinary understanding, O Shiva.

kimīhaḥ kiṃ kāya sa khalu kim upāyas tribhuvanaṃ
kim ādhāro dhātā sṛjati kim upādāna iti ca
atarkyaiśvaryaṃ tvayyanavasaradaḥ hatadhiyaḥ
kutar ko’sya kāṃścin mukharayati mohāya jagat॥ 5॥

O Shiva, You and Your power are beyond the grasp of reason. Still some, their intellect darkened, ask inane questions such as “What was the creator’s motive? By what means was creation made?” and thus confuse the world. True understanding comes not through dry logic but through devotion and realization of Your infinite majesty.

== See also ==
- Shiva Tandava Stotra
- Shiva Panchakshara Stotra
- Ashtalakshmi Stotra
