= Stotra =

Sanskrit work meaning "ode" or "eulogy"

Stotra (Sanskrit: स्तोत्र) is a literary genre of Hindu religious texts. They are designed to be melodically sung, and can be a prayer, a description, or a conversation, but always with a poetic structure. They form a key constituent in various Hindu rituals.

== Etymology ==
'Stotra' means ode, eulogy or a hymn of praise in Sanskrit. It is derived from the Sanskrit root 'stu' meaning 'to praise' combined with the ṣṭran suffix.

== Definition ==
Stotras form a key literary genre of Hindu religious texts and are designed to be melodically sung, in contrast to shastras which are recited. The stotras can take various forms and can be a prayer, a description, or a conversation, but always with a poetic structure. It may be a simple poem expressing praise and personal devotion to a deity or poems embedded with spiritual and philosophical doctrines. They form a key constituent in various Hindu rituals.

The earliest stotras are Vedic, particularly from the Samaveda. The stotras appear in various branches of Hinduism and other Indian religions such as Buddhism and Jainism, and can form part of larger texts such as the epics, Puranas, and Tantras. Stotras listing the different names of a deity are named as nama-stotras and Sahasranama, a type of nama-stotra, is a litany of a thousand names for a particular deity. A common feature of most stotras other than Nama stotras is the repetition of words or phrases at the end of every verse (refrain).

== Example ==
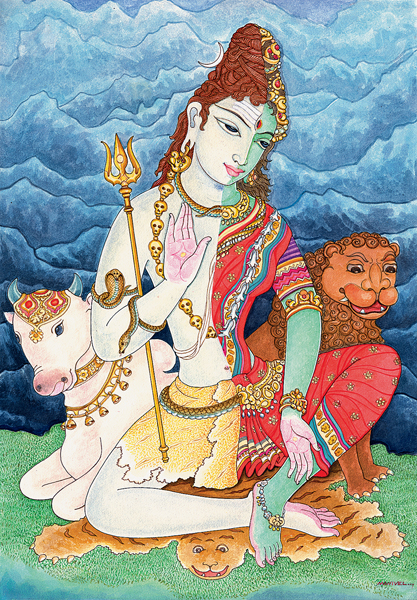
Ardhanarishvara

Appar composed the following stotra, dedicated to Ardhanarishvara, in Tamil which formed part of the fourth volume of Thirumurai.

Puthuviri ponseyōlai yorukāthor kāthu
surisanga nintru puraḷa
vithivithi vēthakītha morupādu mōtha
morupādu mella nakumāl
mathuviri kontraithuntru sadaipāka māthar
kuḻalpāka māka varuvar
ithuivar vaṇṇavaṇṇam ivaḷvaṇṇa vaṇṇam
eḻilvaṇṇa vaṇṇa miyalbē.

— Appar, song 10, fourth Thirumurai

An earring of bright new gold one ear,
a coiled conch shell sways on the other,
On one side he chants the Vedic melodies,
on the other, he gently smiles,
Matted hair adorned with sweet konrai blossoms on one half of his head,
and a woman's curls on the other, he comes.
The one the nature of his form, the other of hers,
And both are the very essence of his beauty.

— Translation by Indira Viswanathan Peterson

== See also ==
- List of suktas and stutis
