= Gopalavimshati =

Hindu hymn about Krishna

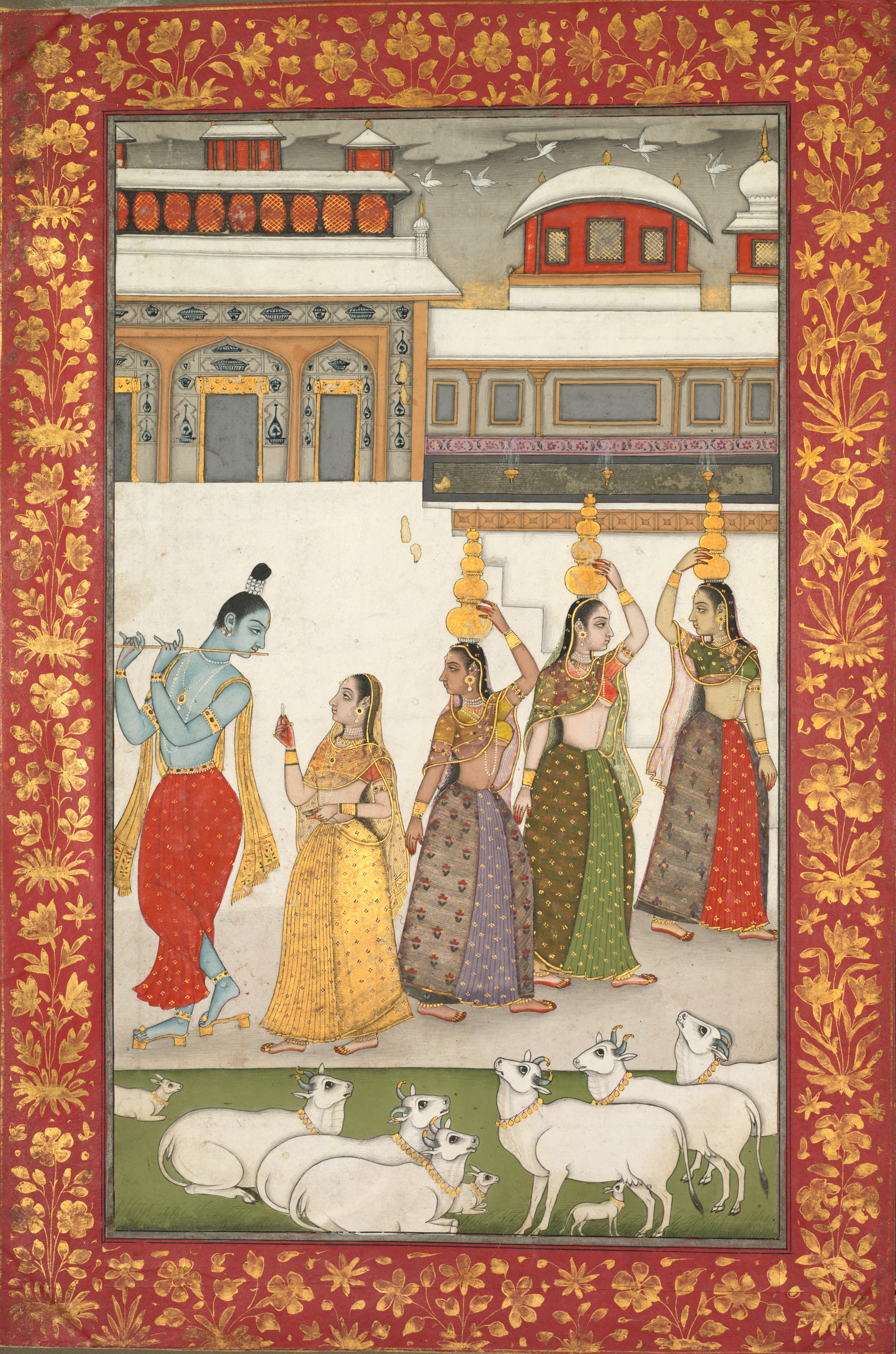
- 18th century painting of Krishna playing the flute with the gopis, Cleveland Museum of Art.

Information
- Religion: Hinduism
- Author: Vedanta Desika
- Language: Sanskrit
- Verses: 21

The Gopalavimshati (Sanskrit: गोपालविंशति, romanized: Gopālaviṃśati) is a Sanskrit hymn written by the Hindu philosopher Vedanta Desika. Comprising 21 verses, the Gopalavimshati extols Krishna, an avatar of the deity Vishnu. The hymn is composed in a number of poetic metres, expressive of the themes of faith and the philosophical idealisation of the deity. The first stanza of the hymn forms the prologue of Vedanta Desika's epic poem, theYadavabhyudaya.

== Etymology ==
Gopala is an epithet of Krishna, literally meaning, "protector of cows", and vimshati means "twenty".

== Description ==
Vedanta Desika is regarded to have composed this work when he visited the temple of Krishna located at Tiruvahindrapuram. The hymn includes the descriptions of the body of Krishna that are meant to evoke devotion in the reader. The work is written in a tone of wonder at the numerous forms of the deity, offering imagery in his role of a mischievous child, a toddler who steals butter, a trickster, dancer, a cowherd who plays the flute, a slayer of malicious beings, as well as a handsome lover of the gopis, all the while concealing his divinity. These identities of the deity are juxtaposed, both conceived as a child and God, great and small, and an unknowable entity and an intimate lover. It is also noted for its description of the deity's navanīta-nāṭya (butter dance).

== Hymn ==
In one of the stanzas of the hymn, the poet exclaims his love for Krishna:

You are the shortest path
to liberation,
a dark monsoon cloud
that hangs over the forest
raining
joy and wealth
A bamboo flute thrills at the touch
of your ruddy
lower lip:
I love you
and worship you,
root cause of creation
pure compassion
in the body
of a man.

— Gopalavimshati, Stanza 9

== See also ==
- Yadavabhyudaya
- Hamsa Sandesha
- Paduka Sahasra
