= Bhaja Govindam =

Sanskrit stotra composed by Adi Shankara

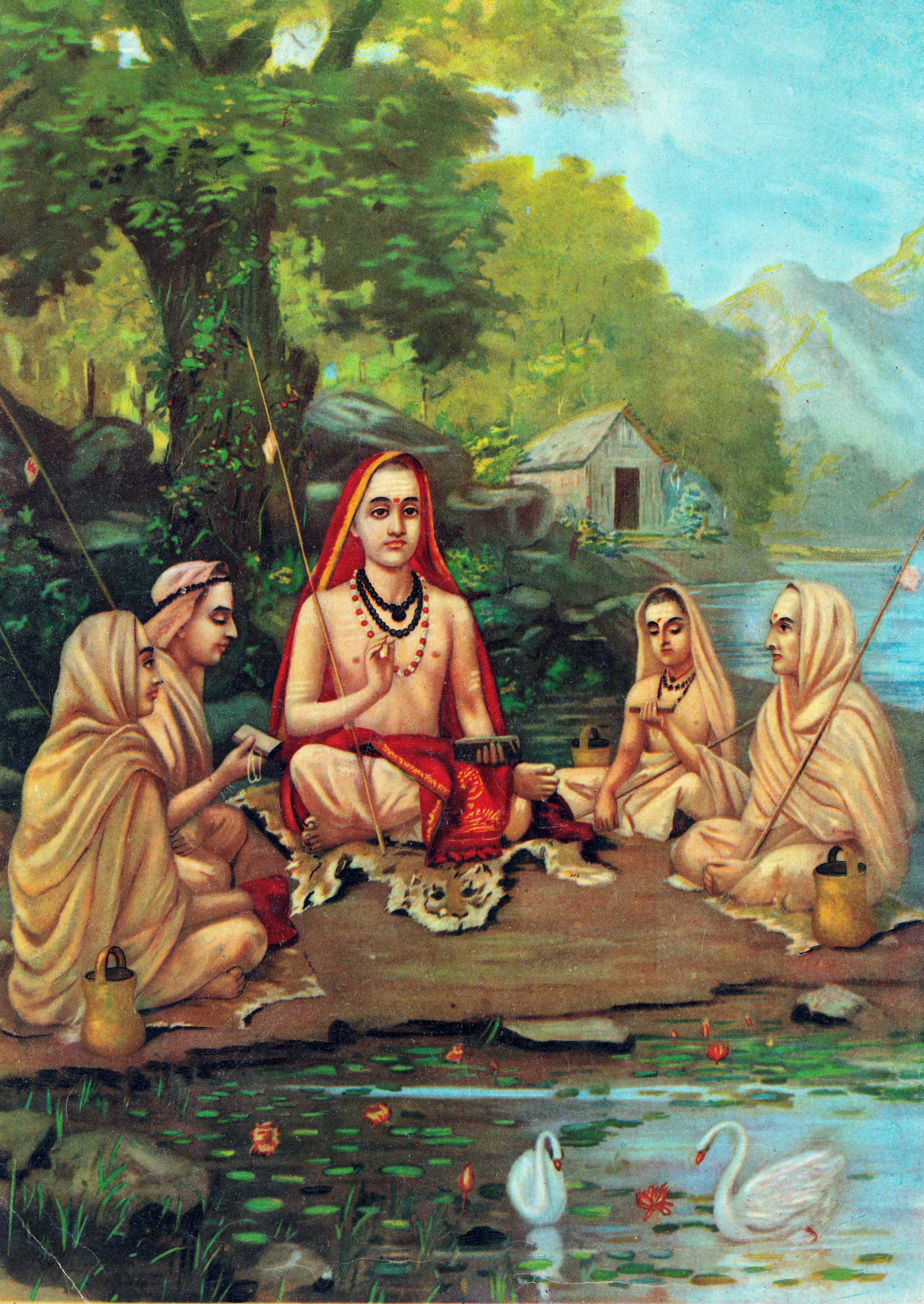
Adi Shankara with his disciples, painting by Raja Ravi Varma

"Bhaja Govindam" (Sanskrit: भज गोविन्दम्, lit. 'praise/seek Govinda'), also known as "Moha Mudgara" (lit. 'destroyer of illusion'), is a popular Hindu devotional poem in Sanskrit composed by Adi Shankara. It underscores the view that bhakti (devotion) is also important along with jñāna (knowledge), as emphasised by the bhakti movement.

== Attribution and traditional account ==
Bhaja Govindam, also known as Moha-mudgara, is traditionally attributed to Adi Shankara. Chinmayananda describes the opening stanza as a refrain that is repeated after each of the verses. Twelve verses, called the Dvadasa-manjarika-stotram, after the opening stanza are traditionally attributed to Shankara. Fourteen further verses, called the Caturdasa-manjarika-stotram, are attributed to fourteen of Shankara's disciples. Some editions of the poem differ in the number, order, wording, and arrangement of stanzas, but the essential meaning of the verses is unchanged.

There is also a traditional story related to the composition of this hymn. It is said that Adi Shankara, accompanied by his disciples, was walking along a street in Varanasi one day, when he came across an elderly scholar repeatedly reciting the rules of Sanskrit grammar of Panini on the street. Taking pity on him, Adi Shankara went up to the scholar and advised him not to waste his time on grammar at his age, but to turn his mind to God in worship and adoration, which would only save him from this vicious cycle of life and death. The hymn "Bhaja Govindam" is said to have been composed on this occasion.

== Significance ==
This composition is a reminder that Adi Shankara, who is often regarded as reviver of the jnana marga, or "path of knowledge", to attain moksha, was also a proponent of the bhakti marga (path of devotion) to attain the same goal. As C. Rajagopalachari put in his commentary, "When intelligence (jnana) matures and lodges securely in the heart, it becomes wisdom (vignyana). When that wisdom (vignyana) is integrated with life and issues out in action, it becomes devotion (bhakti). Knowledge (jnana) which has become mature is spoken of as devotion (bhakti). If it does not get transformed into devotion (bhakti), such knowledge (jnana) is useless tinsel."

In this prayer, Adi Shankara emphasizes the importance of devotion for God as a means to spiritual development and to liberation from the cycle of birth and death. The prayer leaves one in no doubt that the renunciation of our egotistical differences and surrender to God makes for salvation. Many scholars hold that this composition encapsulates with both brevity and simplicity the substance of all Vedantic thought found in whatever other works that Adi Shankara wrote:

"The refrain "Bhaja Govindam", which defines the composition and gives it its name, invokes the almighty in the aspect of Krishna; it is therefore very popular not only with Sri Adi Shankaracharya's immediate followers, the Smarthas, but also with Vaishnavas and others."

== Meter (Chhandas) ==
The core of the composition is in a moraic metre or chhandas, specifically mātrāchandas (मात्राछन्दस्). Scholars identify it as mātrāsamaka (मात्रासमक), where each line is structured by syllabic instants (mātrās) rather than a fixed number of syllables i.e anushtubh etc. Apart from the first verse, all other verses have 16 matras, fitting the description of the padakulakam (पादकुलकम्), a variety of mātrāsamaka in vrtta-ratnakara.

== See also ==
- Hari Stuti
- Kanakadhara Stotra
- Ashtalakshmi Stotra

== Sources ==
- Swami Chinmayananda (1965). Bhaja Govindam, by Sankarācārya.
