= Hari Stotra =

Hindu hymn in praise of Vishnu

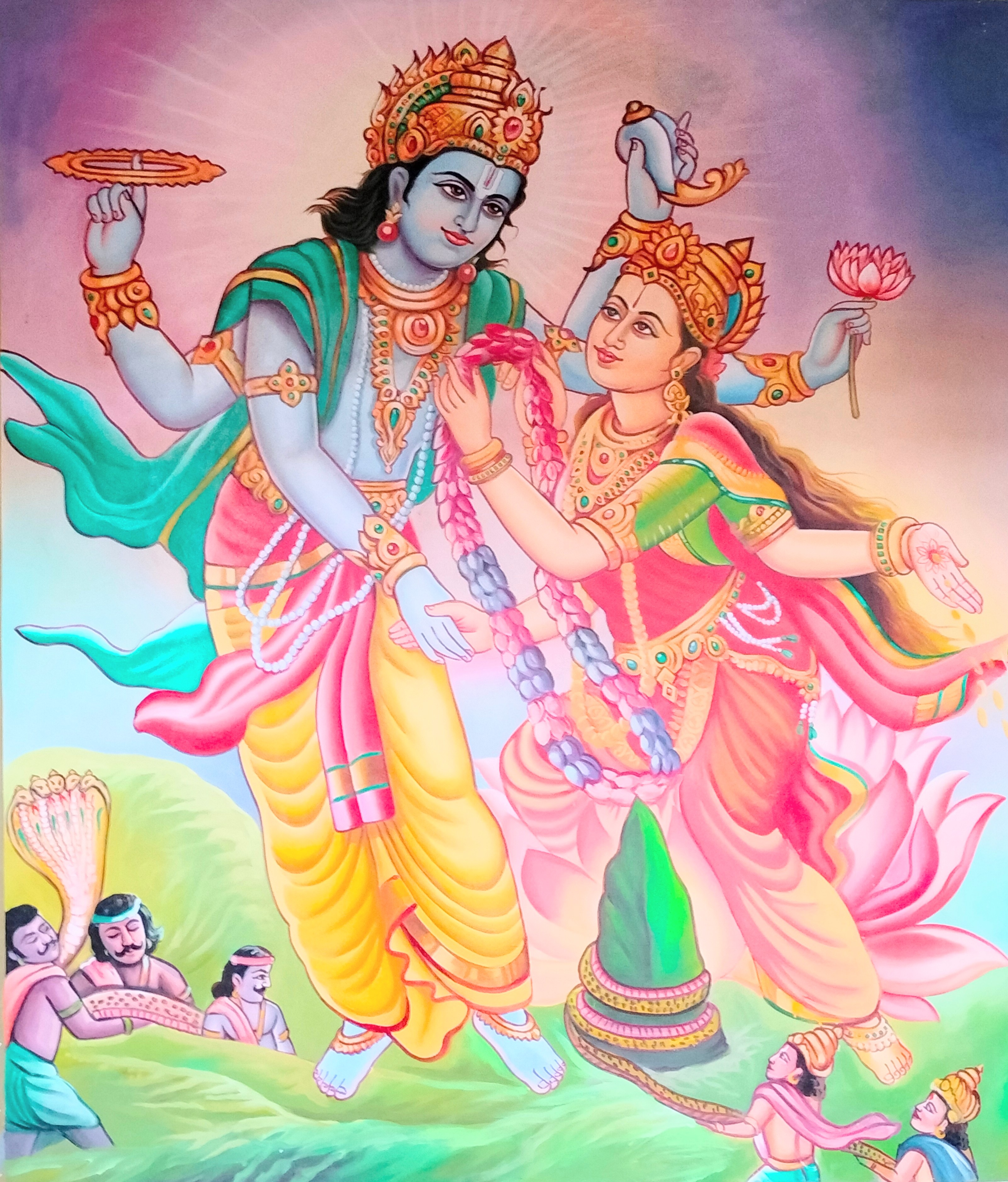
- Painting of the wedding of Vishnu and Lakshmi, Koodal Alagar Temple, Madurai

Information
- Religion: Hinduism
- Author: Brahmananda
- Language: Sanskrit
- Verses: 8

The Hari Stotra (Sanskrit: हरिस्तोत्रम्, romanized: Haristotraṃ) is a Sanskrit stotra (hymn) written by the Hindu monk Swami Brahmananda. Comprising 8 verses, the hymn extols the deity Vishnu.

== Hymn ==
The first verse of the Hari Stotra extols the attributes of Vishnu:

jagajjālapālaṃ kanatkaṇṭhamālaṃ
śaraccandrabhālaṃ mahādaityakālaṃ
nabhōnīlakāyaṃ durāvāramāyaṃ
supadmāsahāyaṃ bhaje'ham bhaje'ham

I worship and worship him
who is the garland on the neck of Lakshmi
who is the essence of Vedas, who lives inside water
who lightens the weight of the earth
who has an eternally pleasing form
who has a form which attracts the mind
And who has assumed several forms

== See also ==
- Hari Stuti
- Hayagriva Stotra
- Rama Raksha Stotra
