= Hari Stuti =

Hindu hymn in praise of Vishnu

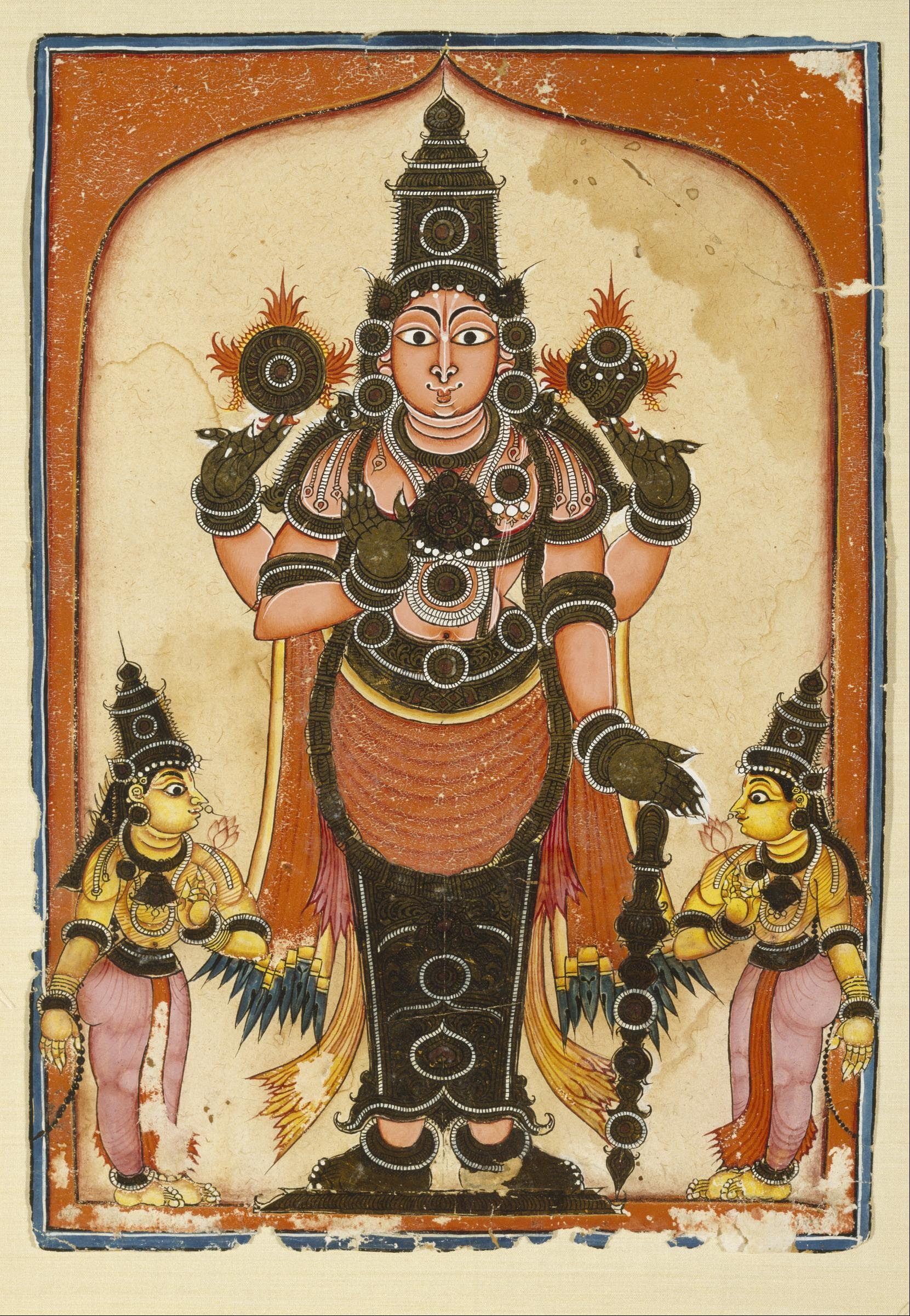
- Painting of Vishnu with his consorts, Sridevi (Lakshmi) and Bhudevi (Bhumi)

Information
- Religion: Hinduism
- Author: Adi Shankara
- Language: Sanskrit
- Verses: 44

The Hari Stuti (Sanskrit: हरिस्तुति, romanized: Haristuti), sometimes rendered the Harimide Stuti, is a Sanskrit hymn written by the Hindu philosopher Adi Shankara. Comprising 44 verses, the work is an ode to the deity Vishnu.

== Etymology ==
Hari is an epithet of Vishnu meaning 'the one who takes away' (sins), and stuti is translated as a hymn.

== Description ==
The Hari Stuti is regarded to have been composed by Adi Shankara during his stay in the Himalayas.

== Hymn ==
The first verse of the hymn extols the attributes of Vishnu:

stōṣyē bhaktyā viṣṇumanādiṁ jagadādiṁ
yasminnētatsaṁsṛticakram bhramatittham
yasmin dṛṣṭē naśyati tatsaṁsṛticakraṁ
tam saṁsāradhvāntavināśaṁ harimīḍē

— Hari Stuti, Verse 1

I praise, with devotion, the All-pervading (Vishnu), who, himself without origin, is the origin of the universe, in whom this wheel of samsara revolves in this wise, and, on realising whom, this wheel of samsara is destroyed— that Hari, the destroyer of the darkness of samsara, I praise.

== See also ==
- Bhaja Govindam
- Lakshmi Stuti
- Dasha Shloki
