= Paduka Sahasra =

Sanskrit devotional poem

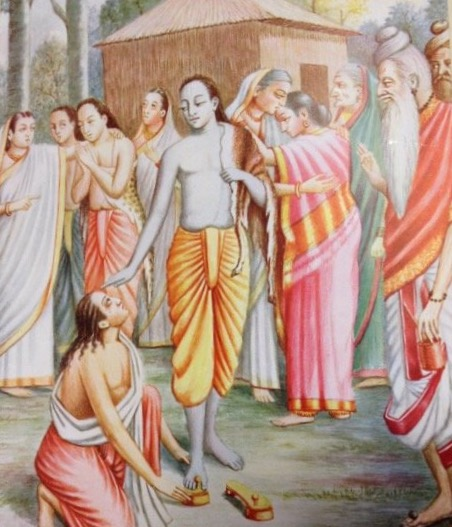
- Painting of the paduka (sandals) of Rama.

Information
- Religion: Hinduism
- Author: Vedanta Desika
- Language: Sanskrit
- Verses: 1000

The Paduka Sahasra (Sanskrit: पादुकासहस्रम्, romanized: Pādukāsahasram) is a Sanskrit stotrakavya (eulogistic poem) written by the Hindu philosopher Vedanta Desika in the 14th century CE. Comprising one thousand verses, the subject of the poem are the paduka (sandals) of the deity Ranganatha of Srirangam, a form of Vishnu. The verses of the poem extol and associate these sandals with those of Rama, the protagonist of the Ramayana. The poem is regarded to be one of Vedanta Desika's greatest works.

== Etymology ==
In Sanskrit, pādukā refers to sandals or footwear and sahasra means thousand. The Paduka Sahasra is translated as the, "thousand verses on the sandals" of Ranganatha.

== Legend ==
According to Sri Vaishnava tradition, the 1,000 verses of the Paduka Sahasra were composed in a single night by Vedanta Desika as a part of a literary contest. By doing so, the poet defeated Alagiya Manavala Perumal, a theologian of the Tenkalai sect, who had only been able to compose 300 verses during the allotted period.

== Content ==
A central theme of the Paduka Sahasra is prapatti, the Vaishnava concept of complete surrender to God. The poet also explores the monism as expressed by the Vishishtadvaita philosophy. The initial paddhatis (anthologies) of the work draw inspiration from the Ramayana of Valmiki, reflecting its poetry and philosophy in its verses. The episode of Bharata receiving the sandals of his brother Rama to place them upon the throne of Ayodhya to begin his regency is conceived as the crux of the epic, interpreted with great spiritual significance. The sandals are construed as the perfect symbolism of divinity.

== Hymn ==
Desika offers a poetic description of the sandals in one of his verses:

surabhi nigama gandhā saumyapadmākarasthā kanaka
kamalinīva prekshyasē pādukē tvam
bramara iva sadhā tvām prāptha nānā vihāraḥ
shathamakha maṇinīlaḥ sēvathē sāraṅgadhanvā

— Paduka Sahasra, Verse 743

O sandals, having the perfume named the Vedas and residing in the beautiful lotus pond, you are effulgent as a golden lotus. Multi-sport-driven, having the green body brilliance like the emeralds, holding a bow named Sharanga, God is experiencing you all the time just like the bees.

== See also ==
- Yadavabhyudaya
- Hamsa Sandesha
- Sri Stuti
