= R. Kesava Aiyangar =

Indian lawyer (1892–1991)

- Born: 1892; Ramanathapuram district, Tamil Nadu
- Died: 9 November 1991 (aged 98–99)
- Occupation: Senior Lawyer
- Known for: Exponent of the Hindu law

R. Kesava Aiyangar was a Senior Advocate of the Supreme Court of India. He practiced law for over 75 years both there and at the High Court of Madras.

He was born in 1892 in the Ramanathapuram district of Tamil Nadu in India.

== Lawyer ==
He played an important role in the framing of the format of the Writ Petition in the courts of India. He was a widely recognized exponent of the Hindu law and was also one of the longest serving lawyers in the country.

== Scholarly work ==
Apart from being a senior lawyer, he was also a highly respected scholar of both Sanskrit and Tamil. He served as the president of the Tamil sangam in Triplicane for over three years.

Some of his works written during the time includes Parthasarathymalai, Thirupadugamalai and Andalmalai. In 1974, a book named 'Vedanta Desika's satadushani' of Srivatsankacharya was released. It carried an exhaustive introduction of high scholarly value by R. Kesava Aiyangar. He also authored a book titled "Adiyavarku Meyyan Arul" which expounds the philosophy of Saranagati.

But his magnum opus is the work in Tamil about Thirukkural of Thiruvalluvar called Valluvar Ullam. This highly controversial work disputed the claims of the scholars of the Dravidian Movement that Thirukkural is completely independent of the Vedic thoughts and of Hindu philosophy. It establishes with great authority that Thirukkural is indeed part of the Vedic tradition and is not, in any way, alien to it by giving extensive references from Sanskrit literature and various ancient Tamil Hindu works which mirror the thoughts of the Thirukkural. The book was highly regarded and reviewed in The Indian Express.

== Death ==
R. Kesava Aiyangar died on 9 November 1991 at the age of 99.
