= Sri Shirdi Saibaba Mahathyam =

1986 Telugu film

- Directed by: K. Vasu
- Written by: Madhu Kumar
- Screenplay by: K. Vasu
- Story by: Sai Chakra Unit; Robin Charles; Vijaya Rathnam
- Produced by: Gogineni Prasad; K. Babu Rao
- Starring: Vijayachander; Chandra Mohan; J. V. Somayajulu; Anjali Devi
- Cinematography: V. Jayaram
- Edited by: Nayani Maheswara Rao
- Music by: Ilaiyaraaja
- Production company: Saradhi Studios
- Distributed by: Sai Chakra Productions
- Release date: 1986
- Country: India
- Language: Telugu

Sri Shirdi Saibaba Mahathyam is a 1986 Telugu-language hagiographical film written and directed by K. Vasu, based on the life of Sai Baba of Shirdi who has preached and practiced Religious humanism. Vijayachander portrayed the role of Baba. The film was a blockbuster and remained a cult classic. The film ran for 175 days in 12 centers, was screened at the International Film Festival of India and the Moscow Film Festival. The soundtrack was composed by Ilaiyaraaja, with lyrics written by Acharya Aatreya, and received wide appreciation. The film was dubbed into Hindi as Shirdi Sai Baba Ki Kahani and into Tamil as Sri Shirdi Saibaba.

== Plot ==
Sadguru Sai Baba of Shirdi lived in British India. He was initially shunned by both Hindus and Muslims, especially by Hindu Bal Bhate. Sai was a Muslim and Bal Bhate forbade him to enter any Temple. Rohila, a Muslim, who thought Sai was desecrating the local Masjid by performing Hindu prayers and incantations, attempted to kill Sai. Then he saw both the Allah and Bhagwan in Sai and became a devotee. When Sai was ready to give up his body and resurrect himself after 3 days, just like Lord Jesus, a disbelieving Bal had wanted Sai's body to be cremated within 24 hours - only to find out that Sai had indeed risen, and also became his devotee.

Bhagoti, a leper, who was cured by Sai became his follower. Though Sai had no relations, he did call Tatya's mother his sister; Tatya his maternal nephew; a devotee named Laxmi as his daughter, and an elderly woman as his mother. Sai displayed his true form and opulence to another devotee, Nana Chandorkar. Sai lived in a rebuilt Masjid and urged his devotees to pray to God, as the Creator and to love and respect all living beings. He begged for alms daily so that he could collect sins and wash them away.

He always uttered "Allah Bhala Kare" and "Bhagwan Bhala Kare" to both Muslims and Hindus alike. He appeared in a multitude forms to his devotees (Lord Jesus, Guru Nanak Devji, Allah, Bhagwan Shri Ganesh) to cater to the various tastes of devotees. Sai was also fond of Nanavli, a mentally challenged devotee, who often challenged Sai. He was one of the few who really understood and accepted Sai as Vishnu's Avatar. Sai appeared simultaneously in a wealthy man's and Nana's dreams and called upon them to construct a Mandir of Bhagwan Shri Krishna. While the construction was under way, Sai prophesied the death of Tatya. Shortly thereafter while bequeathing the nine coins symbolizing nine virtues to Laxmi (which depict Sravan, Kirtan, Smaran, Padaseva, Archana, Namaskar, Dastan, Samveta and Atmanivrdan) Sai was ready to demonstrate to his devotees why they should not worry about Tatya's impending demise.

== Cast ==
- Vijayachander as Sai Baba of Shirdi
- Chandra Mohan as Nanavali
- Kanta Rao as Shyama
- Seshagiri Rao as Mahalsapathi
- Anjali Devi as Baayeeja Bai
- Sarath Babu as Chand Patel
- J. V. Somayajulu as Nana Chandorkar
- Ramakrishna as Aayaram
- Chalam as Gayaram
- Suthi Veerabhadra Rao as Bal Bhate
- Tyagaraaju as Daroga Dasuganu
- Adabala as Bhagoti
- Jaya Bhaskar as Ramachandra Patil
- Raja as Tatya Patil
- Kanchana
- Murali Mohan
- Ramaprabha
- Rushyendramani
- Sridhar
- Vijaya Chamadeswari

== Soundtrack ==
The music rights of the film were acquired by Aditya Music

All music is composed by Ilaiyaraaja.

Track listing
No.	Title	Singer(s)	Length
1.	"Baba Sai Baba Neevu Maavale Manishivani"	S. P. Balasubrahmanyam
2.	"Daivam Manava Roopamlo Avatarinchunee Lokamlo"	P. Susheela
3.	"Hey Panduranga Hey Pandarinadha Saranam"	Yesudas
4.	"Jai Shirdi Naadha Saideva (Dandakam)"	V. Ramakrishna
5.	"Maa Paapala Tolaginchu Deepala Neeve Veliginchinavayya"	Yesudas
6.	"Nuvvu Leka Anadhalam Bratukanta Ayomayam Baba"	S. P. Balasubrahmanyam, Chorus
7.	"Slokams"	Yesudas

== See also ==
- Shirdi Ke Sai Baba 1977 film starring Sudhir Dalvi as Sai Baba of Shirdi
- Jagadguru Sri Shiridi Saibaba a 2009 Telugu film starring B. V. Reddy as Sai Baba of Shirdi
- Shirdi Sai, a 2012 Telugu film starring Nagarjuna as Sai Baba of Shirdi
- Mere Sai – Shraddha Aur Saburi, a Television series between 2021-2023 starring Tushar Dalvi, Abeer Soofi and Abhishek Nigam as Sai Baba of Shirdi
