= Hari =

Epithet of Vishnu

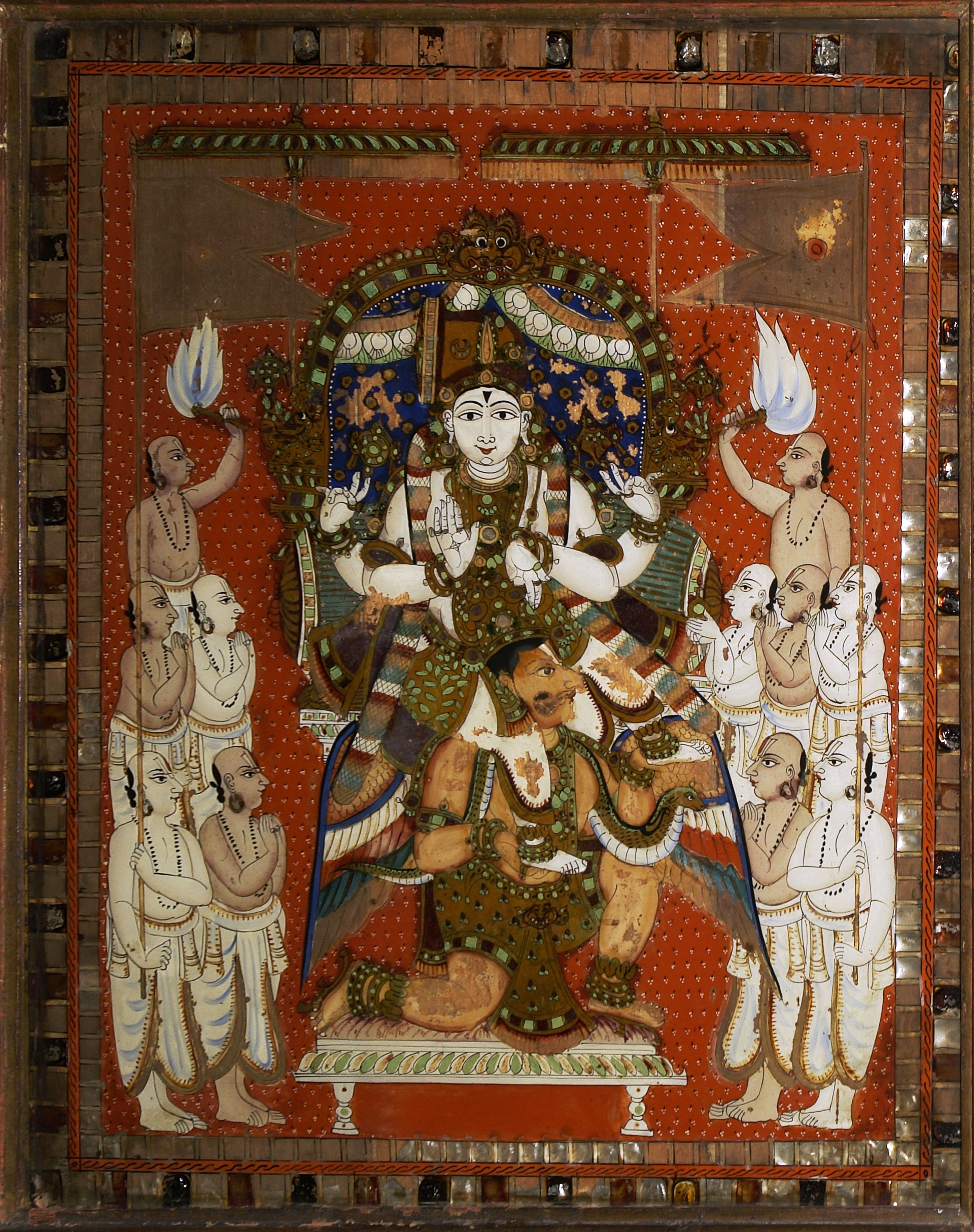
Painting of Vishnu, Crafts Museum, New Delhi, India

Hari (Sanskrit: हरि) is among the primary epithets of the Hindu preserver deity Vishnu, meaning 'the one who takes away' (sins). It refers to the one who removes darkness and illusion, the one who removes all obstacles to spiritual progress.

The name Hari also appears as the 650th name of Vishnu in the Vishnu Sahasranama of the Mahabharata and is considered to be of great significance in Vaishnavism.

== Etymology ==
The Sanskrit word "हरि" (Hari) is derived from the Proto-Indo-European root "*ǵʰel- to shine; to flourish; green; yellow" which also gave rise to the Persian terms zar 'gold', Greek khloros 'green', Slavic zelen 'green' and zolto 'gold', as well as the English words yellow and gold.

The same root occurs in other Sanskrit words like haridrā, 'turmeric', named for its yellow color.

In Hinduism, beginning with Adi Sankara's commentary on the Vishnu sahasranama, hari became etymologized as derived from the verbal root hṛ "to grab, seize, steal", in the context of Vaishnavism interpreted as "to take away or remove evil or sin", and the name of Vishnu rendered as "he who destroys samsara", which is the entanglement in the cycle of birth and death, along with ignorance, its cause; compare hara as a name of Shiva, translated as "seizer" or "destroyer".

== In Indian religions ==
=== In Hinduism ===
- The Harivamsha ("lineage of Hari") is a text in both the Purana and Itihasa traditions.
- As the name of tawny-colored animals, hari may refer to lions (also a name of the zodiacal sign Leo), bay horses, or monkeys. The feminine Harī is the name of the mythological "mother of monkeys" in the Sanskrit epics.
- Harihara is the name of a fused deity form of both Vishnu (Hari) and Shiva (Hara) in Hinduism.
- Hari is the name of a class of gods under the fourth Manu (manu tāmasa, "Dark Manu") in the Puranas.
- Haridasa is the Hari-centered bhakti movement from Karnataka.
- In the Gaudiya Vaishnava tradition, Hari is a name of both Krishna and Vishnu, invoked in the Hare Krishna mahamantra (Hare could be a vocative form of Hari).
- The Hari Stuti is a hymn in praise of Vishnu composed by Adi Shankara.
- The Hari Stotra is a Sanskrit hymn.
- Hari Om is a mantra and greeting.

=== In Sikhism ===
The name "ਹਰਿ" (Hari) is frequently used as a name for Waheguru in the Sri Guru Granth Sahib:

ਹਰਿ ਹਰਿ ਹਰਿ ਹਰਿ ਨਾਮੁ ਹੈ ਗੁਰਮੁਖਿ ਪਾਵੈ ਕੋਇ ॥
Hari, Hari, Hari, Hari is the Name (of the Lord); rare are those who, as Gurmukh, obtain it. (SGGS, Ang.1313)

In the Varan Bhai Gurdas, an early explanation and interpretation of Sikh theology, Bhai Gurdas also associates the name "ਹਰਿ" (Hari) in the form of Hari Krishan in the Dwapur Yuga with the letter "ਹ" (h) in "ਵਾਹਿਗੁਰੂ" (Waheguru).

However, in the context of the Sri Guru Granth Sahib, the name "Hari" refers to the one monotheistic God of Sikhism, as similar to "Hari" is used in Vaishnavism for Parabrahman as well. However Sarabloh Granth and Dasam Granth call Krishna as Hari several times. Krishna creates several Krishna during his avatar during Ras Leela which is what Guru Ram Das mentioned in Adi Granth that Hari himself creates several Kanha for the Gopis and he himself becomes those Gopis.

== See also ==
- Vishnu
- Narayana
- Govinda
- Perumal
- Ishvara
- Purushottama
- Krishna
