= Garuda Dandaka =

Hindu hymn about Garuda

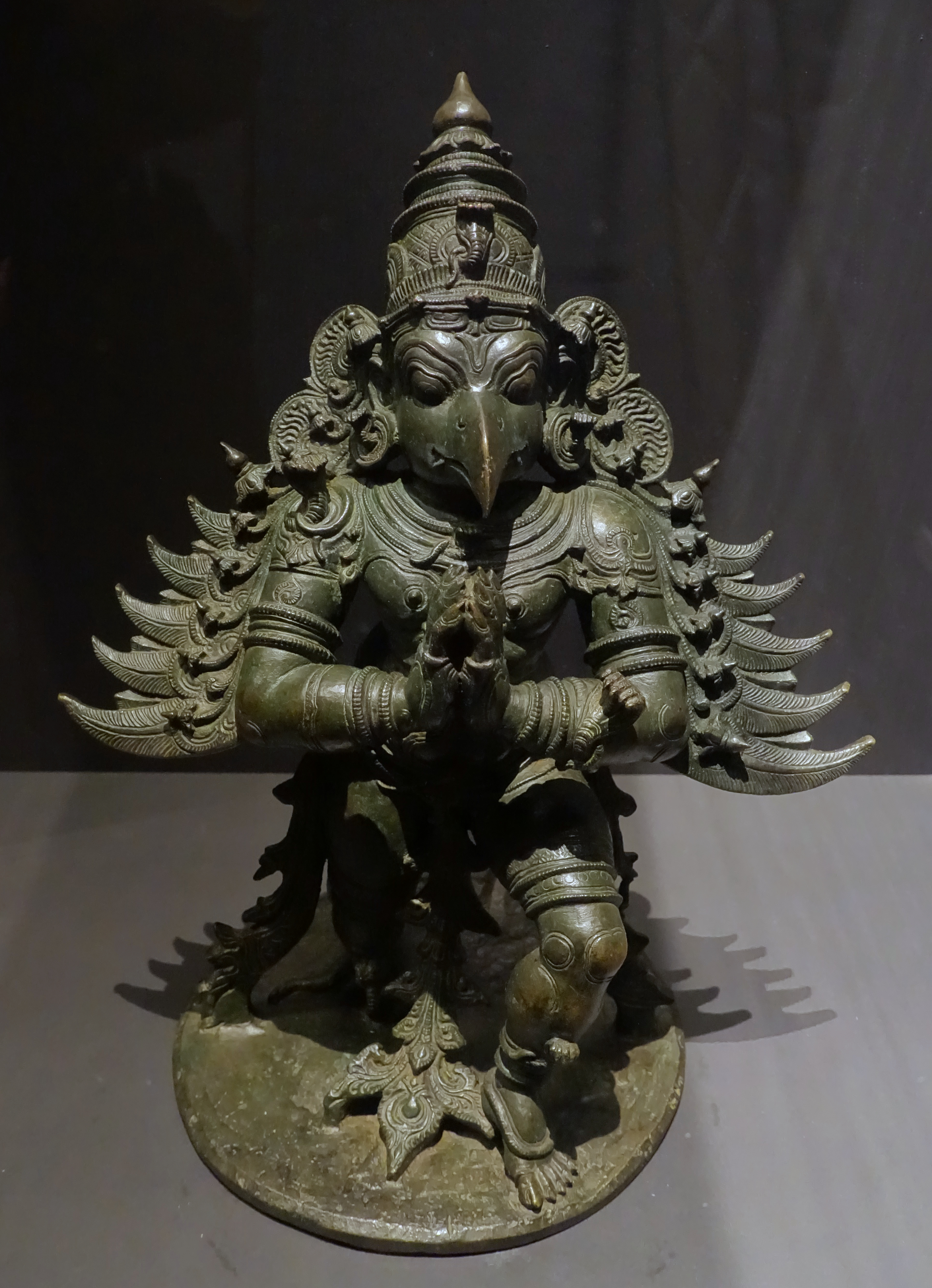
- Bronze statue of Garuda, 15th-16th century CE, Tamil Nadu, India. Linden-Museum, Germany.

Information
- Religion: Hinduism
- Author: Vedanta Desika
- Language: Sanskrit
- Period: 13th-14th century CE

The Garuda Dandaka (Sanskrit: गरुडदण्डकम्, romanized: Garuḍadaṇḍakam) is a Sanskrit hymn written by the Hindu philosopher Vedanta Desika. Comprising six stanzas composed in the dandaka metre, the hymn eulogises Garuda, the vahana (mount) of the Hindu deity Vishnu.

== Legend ==
According to the Sri Vaishnava narrative, a snake-charmer once challenged Vedanta Desika at the town of Kanchipuram to prove his multifaceted reputation by defeating him in the art of snake-charming. Vedanta Desika agreed on the persuasion of his pupils, drawing seven lines on the ground and asking the snake-charmer to show the power of his snakes. When the snake-charmer released a number of his venomous snakes (cobras) upon the ground, they perished after crossing the first and the second lines; when more venomous snakes were released, they died after crossing the fifth and the sixth lines. The snake-charmer then set loose his most venomous snake, called Saṃkhapāla. Saṃkhapāla crossed all seven of the lines and was poised to strike Vedanta Desika. The philosopher instantly chanted the Garuda Dandaka hymn, whereupon Garuda saved him by carrying Saṃkhapāla away. When the snake-charmer requested Vedanta Desika for the return of the snake, the philosopher extolled Garuda by composing a hymn called the Garuda Panchashat, after which Garuda returned the snake to the snake-charmer.

== Hymn ==
The first verse of the hymn praises the attributes of Garuda:

garuḍamakhilavēdanīḍādhirūḍhaṁ dviṣatpīḍanōtkaṇṭhitākuṇṭha
vaikuṇṭhapīṭhīkṛta skandhamīḍē
svanīḍā gatiprītarudrā sukīrtistanābhōga gāḍhōpagūḍhaṁ sphuratkaṇṭaka vrāta vēdhavyathā
vēpamāna dvijihvādhipā kalpaviṣphāryamāṇa sphaṭāvāṭikā ratnarōciśchaṭā rājinīrājitaṁ kāntikallōlinī rājitam

— Verse 1, Garuda Dandaka

Garuda dwells in all the Vedas, which are his nest. His shoulders are the seat of Vaikuntha, accompanying Vishnu when he conquers his foes. His wives, Rudra and Sukirti, pine for him when he departs. They embrace him tightly upon his return, causing his hair to rise and snakes to move their hoods in pain. The jewels upon their heads radiate like the light of the camphor as if to welcome his arrival.

== See also ==
- Dayashataka
- Sri Stuti
- Hayagriva Stotra
