= Dasha Shloki =

Sanskrit hymn

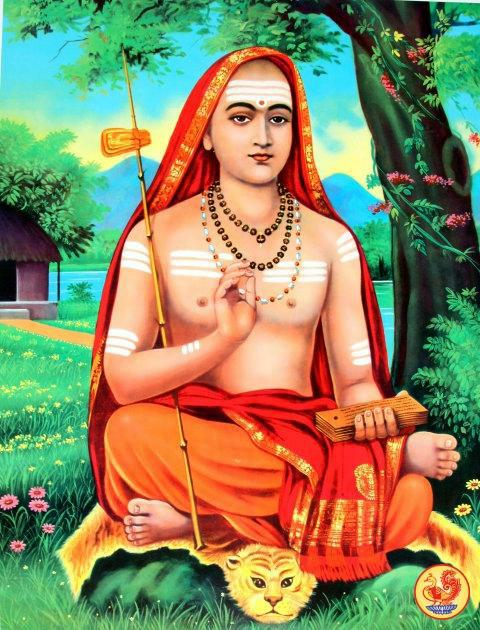
- Painting of Adi Shankara

Information
- Religion: Hinduism
- Author: Adi Shankara
- Language: Sanskrit
- Verses: 10

The Dasha Shloki (Sanskrit: दशश्लोकी, romanized: Daśaślokī) is a Sanskrit hymn by the Hindu philosopher Adi Shankara. Comprising ten verses, the Dasha Shloki explores the Brahman-Atman relationship and the author's interpretation of the nature of the self.

== Etymology ==
Dasha Shloki is Sanskrit for "ten verses".

== Description ==
According to legend, Adi Shankara chanted this hymn in response to his disciples's final request for him, which was to explain the essence of the teachings of Vedanta. He is believed to have first sung the hymn when he met his guru, Govindapada.

In the hymn, Adi Shankara states that the nature of the self is identical to Brahman, which is not identical to the finite and unreal not-self. He also describes the self as that which is one, auspicious, free of attributes and assimilation, and eternal.

== Hymn ==
The first stanza of the hymn describes the author's interpretation of his self as identical to Brahman:

na bhūmirna toyaṃ na tejo na vāyuḥ
na khaṃ nendriyaṃ vā na teṣāṃ samūhaḥ
anaikāntikatvāt suṣuptyekasiddhaḥ
tadeko'vaśiṣṭaḥ śivaḥ kevalo'ham

Neither earth, nor water, nor fire, nor air, nor ether, nor sense-organ, nor their aggregate (am I) because they are inconstant. That which is the one established in sleep, that one which remains (after the sublation of all else) - that auspicious absolute (Self) I am.

— Dasha Shloki, Verse 1

== See also ==
- Chatuh Shloki
- Hari Stuti
- Ashtalakshmi Stotra
