= Lakshmi Stuti =

Hindu hymn dedicated to Lakshmi

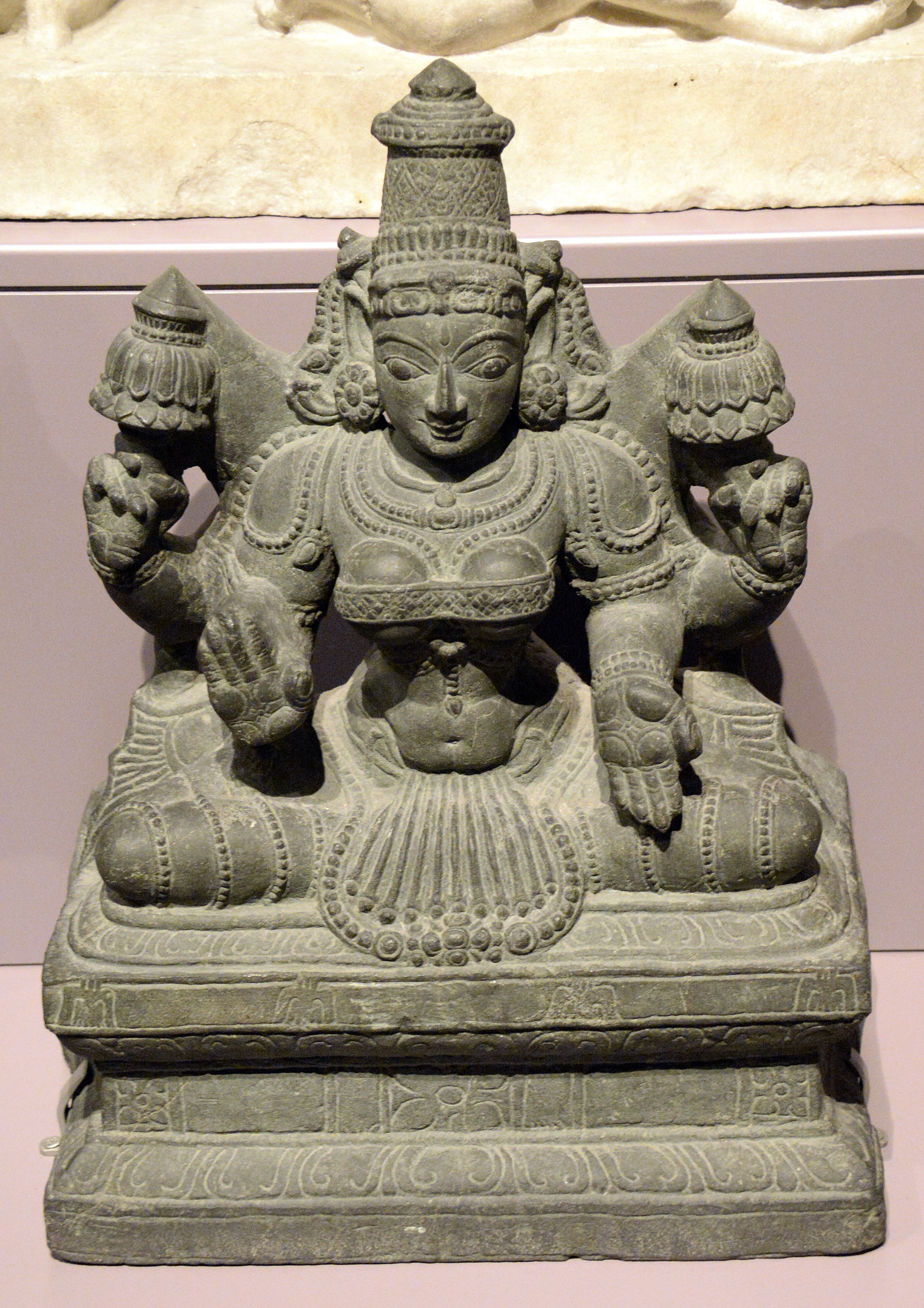
Statue of the goddess Lakshmi, extolled in this work. From South India, 16th century CE. National Museum of Scotland, Edinburgh

The Lakshmi Stuti (Sanskrit: लक्ष्मीस्तुति, romanized: Lakṣmīstuti) is a Hindu hymn written in praise of Lakshmi, the Hindu goddess of wealth and prosperity. According to the Puranas as well as Vaishnava tradition, the authorship of this hymn is attributed to Indra, the king of the devas. It is widely used in the popular worship of the goddess and also invoked during vratas (vows).

== Legend ==
The Vishnu Purana features an important episode in Hindu mythology known as the Samudra Manthana, the churning of the ocean. According to this legend, the sage Durvasa once acquired a divine garland from an apsara, a celestial singer. When he came across Indra, the king of the devas, he hurled the garland towards him. Indra caught the garland and placed it upon his elephant, who seized it with its trunk and flung it towards the earth. Durvasa, furious at the disrespectful treatment of his gift, proclaimed that the garland had been the dwelling of Sri (fortune) and cursed Indra, stating that the latter would lose his dominion over the universe. The devas lost their strength due to a blight on Amaravati, the non-performance of sacrifices, and the loss of the devotion of human beings. Taking advantage of the weakness of their foes, the daityas and the danavas, together known as the asuras, defeated the devas. The devas fled to seek refuge in Brahma, who accompanied them to Kshira Sagara, the realm of Vishnu. After being propitiated, Vishnu appeared, and advised the devas to do perform the churning of the ocean of milk with the help of the asuras.

After the churning of the ocean, the goddess Lakshmi appeared, and was immediately offered veneration by all the assembled deities. The goddess Ganga, as well as the Ashtadiggajas, the elephants of the eight cardinal directions, bathed her, and the divine architect, Vishvakarma, offered her ornaments. Lakshmi chose Vishnu as her consort, spiritually residing herself within his chest, restoring the providence of the devas. After the amrita (nectar of immortality) had been offered to the devas, they were able to vanquish the asuras in battle, and the sovereignty of the three worlds was restored to Indra. Indra eulogised Lakshmi with the Lakshmi Stuti. Pleased, the goddess offered him a boon of his choice. Indra requested that the three worlds may never again be deprived of her presence, and anyone who extolled the goddess with the same prayer that he had would never be forsaken by her. Lakshmi duly granted both of his wishes.

== See also ==
- Sri Suktam
- Sri Stuti
- Ashtalakshmi Stotra
- Kanakadhara Stotra
