= Dandakam =

Metre in Sanskrit poetry

Dandakam or Dhandakam (Telugu: దండకం) is a literary style of poetry seen in Sanskrit prosody, Telugu and Kannada languages. The Stotrams of the Dandakam exceed 26 syllables, and resemble prose. Though verbose and rich in content, Dandakams are actually rarely found in Sanskrit literature when compared to general Stotrams perhaps due to their very complex structure. Most of the Dandakams can be set to a musical notation and are generally sung as Ragamalikas instead of chanting them in the form of Mantras.

== Famous Sanskrit Dandakams ==
- Shyamala Dandakam - Kalidasa - Perhaps the most famous Dandakam, this Stotram praises the divine goddess Shyamala Devi. This Dandakam was popularized by the legendary singer D.K. Pattammal.
- Garuda Dandakam - Vedanta Desika - It is said that Desika composed it to summon the mighty Garuda when a snake charmer challenged him.
- Komala Dandakam - Velambur Sri Varada Vishnu Kavi (Kettandapatti Andavan) - This beautiful Dandakam is composed on Komalavalli Nachiyar presiding in the Kumbakonam Divya Desam.

== Famous Telugu Dandakams ==
- Mouni Dandakam - Mallikarjuna Pandit
- Bhogini Dandakam - Potana
- Astabhasha Dandakam - Tallapaka Chinathirumalacharyulu
- Tristhali Dandakam - Nandi Thimmana
- Srungara Dandakam - Tallapaka Pedathirumalacharyulu
- Rama Dandakam - Kancharla Gopanna
- Krishna Dandakam - Tekumalla Rangasai
- Rajagopala Dandakam - Kavaturi Raghavaiah
- Nrisimha Dandakam - Enugu Lakshmanna
- Anjaneya Dandakam
- Hari/Dasavathara Dandakam -Andhra Natakapithamaha Dhrmavarm Ramakrishnamacharyulu
- Andhra Nataka Kavitha Pitamahas - kavitha Sahitya Sangeeta Padya Gadya Chandas Alankara works.

== Famous Kannada Dandakams ==
- Lakshmi Narasimha Pradhurbhava Dandakam - Sripadaraja
