= Hayagriva Stotra =

Hindu hymn about Hayagriva

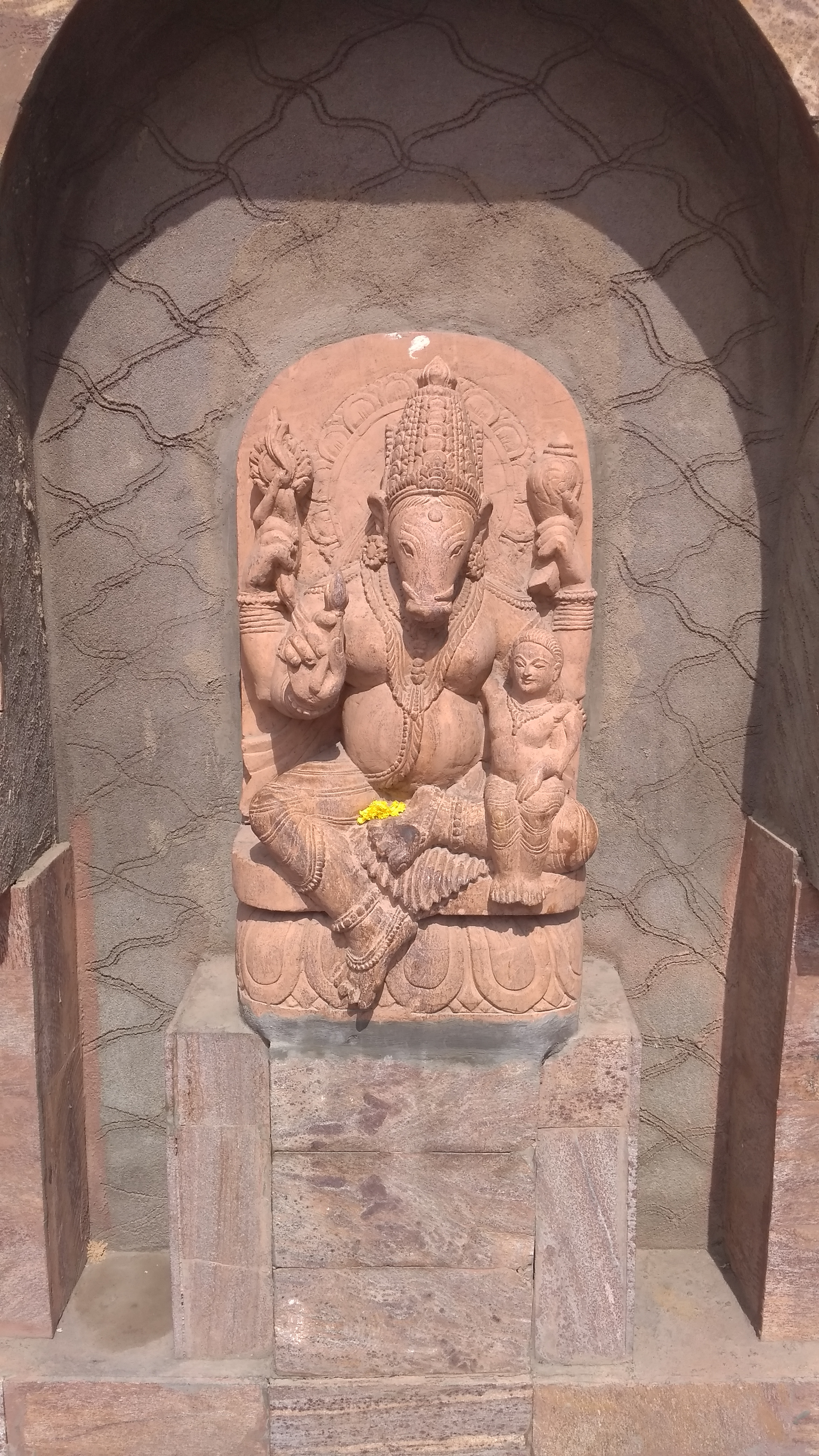
- Statue of Hayagriva, Jagannath Temple, Bangalore

Information
- Religion: Hinduism
- Author: Vedanta Desika
- Language: Sanskrit
- Verses: 33

The Hayagriva Stotra (Sanskrit: हयग्रीवस्तोत्रम्, romanized: Hayagrīvastotraṃ) is a Sanskrit hymn written by the Hindu philosopher Vedanta Desika. Comprising thirty-three verses, the hymn extols Hayagriva, an incarnation of the deity Vishnu. Adherents of the Vadakalai school of the Sri Vaishnava tradition hold this hymn to be the poetic idealisation of the esotericism of the Hayagriva Mantra.

== Legend ==
The Hayagriva Stotra is regarded to be the first devotional composition of Vedanta Desika. According to the Sri Vaishnava narrative, the philosopher once propitiated Garuda, the mount of Vishnu, upon the hillock of Oshada located in Tiruvanthipuram, Cuddalore. Pleased, Garuda appeared to offer the philosopher a murti of Hayagriva, and taught him the Hayagriva Mantra:

jñānānandamayaṃ devaṃ nirmalasphaṭikākṛtiṃ
ādhāraṃ sarvavidyānāṃ hayagrīvaṃ upāsmahē

I worship Hayagriva, who is the personification of knowledge and bliss, who is pure as a crystal, and who is the source of all knowledge.

Having chanted the mantra, Vedanta Desika received a vision of Hayagriva, who is believed to have blessed him with profound knowledge and expertise in poetry.

== Hymn ==
The Hayagriva Mantra serves as the first verse of the Hayagriva Stotra. The second verse serves as a panegyric of the deity:

svatassiddhaṁ śuddhasphaṭikamaṇi bhūbhṛtpratibhaṭaṁ
sudhā sadhrīcībhir dhutibhir avadātatribhuvanam
anantaistrayyantair anuvihita heṣā halahalaṁ
hatāśeṣāvadyaṁ hayavadana mīḍī mahi mahaḥ

— Hayagriva Stotra, Verse 2

We sing the glories of the radiant Hayagriva, born to banish the worldly afflictions of his devotees. His auspicious image is akin to pure white crystal. He radiates the white rays that resemble lustrous nectar, rendering all the three worlds white and pure. He bestows his grace upon all three worlds. The exclamation of his neigh contains the essence of the Upanishads and the Vedas. It removes inauspiciousness and sins, as well as obstacles from one’s path.

== See also ==
- Garuda Dandaka
- Dayashataka
- Rama Raksha Stotra
