= Umamaheshvara =

Hindu philosopher

Uma-maheshvara (IAST: Umāmaheśvara), also known as Abhinava-Kālidāsa ("the new Kalidasa"), was a Sanskrit-language philosopher and grammarian from present-day southern India. He is variously dated to c. 1465 CE or c. 1750 CE.

== Biography ==
Uma-maheshvara was born in a family belonging to the Vellala social group. He was a disciple of Akshaya-suri (or Akkaya-suri) of Mokshagundam family.

According to the Rajashekhara-charita (or Shabharanjana-shataka) of his disciple Kavi-kunjara, Uma-maheshvara "put an end to the machinations" of Durjaya, the court poet of the Vijayanagara king Raja-shekhara. P. Sriramamurti of Andhra University tentatively identifies the ruler as prince Raja-shekhara (the son of Deva Raya III), and on this basis, dates Uma-maheshvara to c. 1465 CE. However, Harold G. Coward and K. Kunchunniraja date him to c. 1750 CE.

== Works ==
Uma-maheshvara wrote the following works on the Advaita Vedanta philosophy:

- Advaita-kamadhenu
- Tattva-chandrika or Nirguna-brahma-mimamsa
- Virodha-varudhini
- Vedanta-siddhanta-sara
- Santana-dipika

Uma-maheshvara defended Adi Shankara's Advaita Vedanta against Ramanuja's Vishishtadvaita. In Virodha-varudhini (or Virodha-varuthini), he proposed to show 100 self-contradictions in the works of Ramanuja and other Vishishtadvaita works such as Satadushani, but fell ill after discussing 27 contradictions. Ramanuja's followers Rangacharya (Ku-drishti-dhvanta-martanda) and Shrinivasa-dikshita (Virodha-varuthini-pramathini) wrote refutations of Uma-maheshvara's criticisms.

Other works attributed to him include:

- Paniniya-vada-nakshtra-mala (IAST: Pāṇinīya-vāda-nakṣatra-mālā), a work on grammar
- Shrngara-shekhara Bhana (IAST: Śṛṅgāra-śekhara Bhana), a Sanskrit play
- Tapta-mudra-vidravana
- Prasanga-Ratnakara
- Ramayana-tika

P. Sriramamurti identifies him with the Abhinava-Kalidasa (or Nava-Kalidasa) who wrote Bhagavata-champu, a work on the life of Krishna.
