= Shatadushani =

Hindu polemic by Vedanta Desika

- Samkhya: Kapila
- Yoga: Patanjali
- Vaisheshika: Kaṇāda, Prashastapada
- Secular: Valluvar

The Shatadushani (Sanskrit: शतदूषणी, romanized: Śatadūṣaṇī) is a polemical treatise written by the Hindu philosopher Vedanta Desika (1278-1369). Literally translating to "one hundred defects", the Shatadushani is a refutation of the hundred central tenets of the philosophy of Advaita.

== Description ==
Though the title of the work suggests hundred refutations, only 66 of them are now available. It establishes the validity of the Vishishtadvaita philosophy of Ramanuja against the Advaita of Adi Shankara.

It is said that at the age of around 50 or 55, Vedanta Desika was invited by his disciples at Srirangam to engage in a polemical debate with a group of Advaitins from North India. The arguments made in the form of refutations against these men are said to be the content of this work.

Surendranath Dasgupta, in his magnum opus The history of Indian Philosophy, has allotted almost 40 pages for this particular book of Vedanta Desika in the third volume of the series.

R. Kesava Aiyangar, a senior advocate of the Supreme Court of India has written an exhaustive introduction to this work in English for the book titled Vedanta Desika's Shatadushani by Srivatsankacharya.

Umamaheshvara's Virodha-varudhini (or Virodha-varuthini) discusses contradictions in Shatadushani and other Vishishtadvaita works.
