= Rama Raksha Stotra =

Hindu religious hymn

- रामरक्षास्तोत्रम्
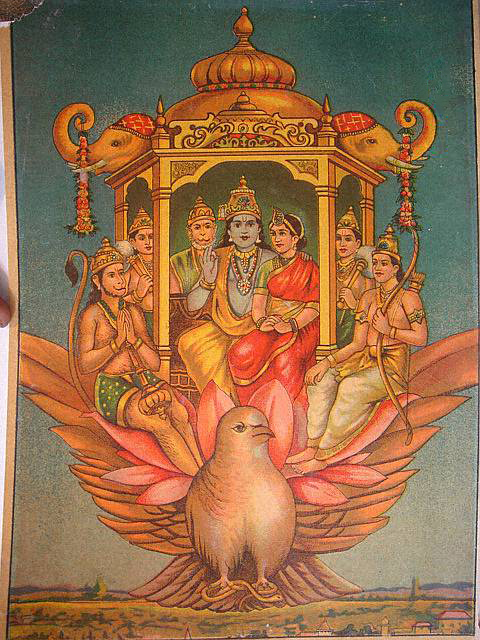
- Painting of Rama and Sita seated upon the Pushpaka Vimana

Information
- Religion: Hinduism
- Author: Budha Kaushika
- Language: Sanskrit
- Period: Vedic period
- Rama Raksha Stotra at Sanskrit Wikisource

The Rama Raksha Stotra (Sanskrit: रामरक्षास्तोत्रम्, romanized: rāma-rakṣā-stotram) is a Sanskrit stotra, a hymn of praise dedicated to the Hindu deity Rama. The poem is often recited by the Hindus as a prayer for protection.

It is said to have been composed by Budha Kaushika, thought to be another name of the revered sage Vishvamitra.

== Hymn ==
The first three verses of the hymn are as follows:

Original Sanskrit verse

चरितं रघुनाथस्य शतकोटिप्रविस्तरम् ।
एकैकमक्षरम् पुंसां महापातकनाशनम् ॥
ध्यात्वा नीलोत्पलश्यामं रामं राजीवलोचनम् ।
जानकीलक्ष्मणोपेतं जटामुकुटमण्डितम् ॥
सासितूणधनुर्बाणपाणिं नक्तंचरान्तकम् ।
स्वलीलया जगत्त्रातुं भाविर्भूतमजं विभुम् ॥

IAST transcription

caritaṁ raghunāthasya śatakoṭipravistaram
ekaikam akṣaram puṁsāṁ mahāpātakanāśanam
dhyātvā nilotpalaśyāmaṁ rāmaṁ rājīvalocanam
jānakīlakṣmaṇopetaṁ jaṭāmukuṭamaṇḍitam
sāsitūṇadhanurbāṇapāṇiṁ naktaṁcarāntakam
svalīlayā jagat trātum bhāvirbhūtam ajaṁ vibhum

English translation

Let me visualise the story of Rama, a story composed of millions of letters,
Each of which has the power to destroy the greatest sins of mankind.
Of Rama, whose complexion resembles a stormy cloud and whose eyes are wide like lotus petals,
Who is accompanied by Sita and Lakshmana and adorned by a crown of matted hair,
Who, holding a sword, bow, and arrows, is an arch-enemy of daemons,
And who, unborn and omnipresent, appeared on earth in order to save it through his play.

== See also ==
- Ashtalakshmi Stotra
- Hayagriva Stotra
- Maruti Stotra
