= Yadavabhyudaya =

Sanskrit epic poem

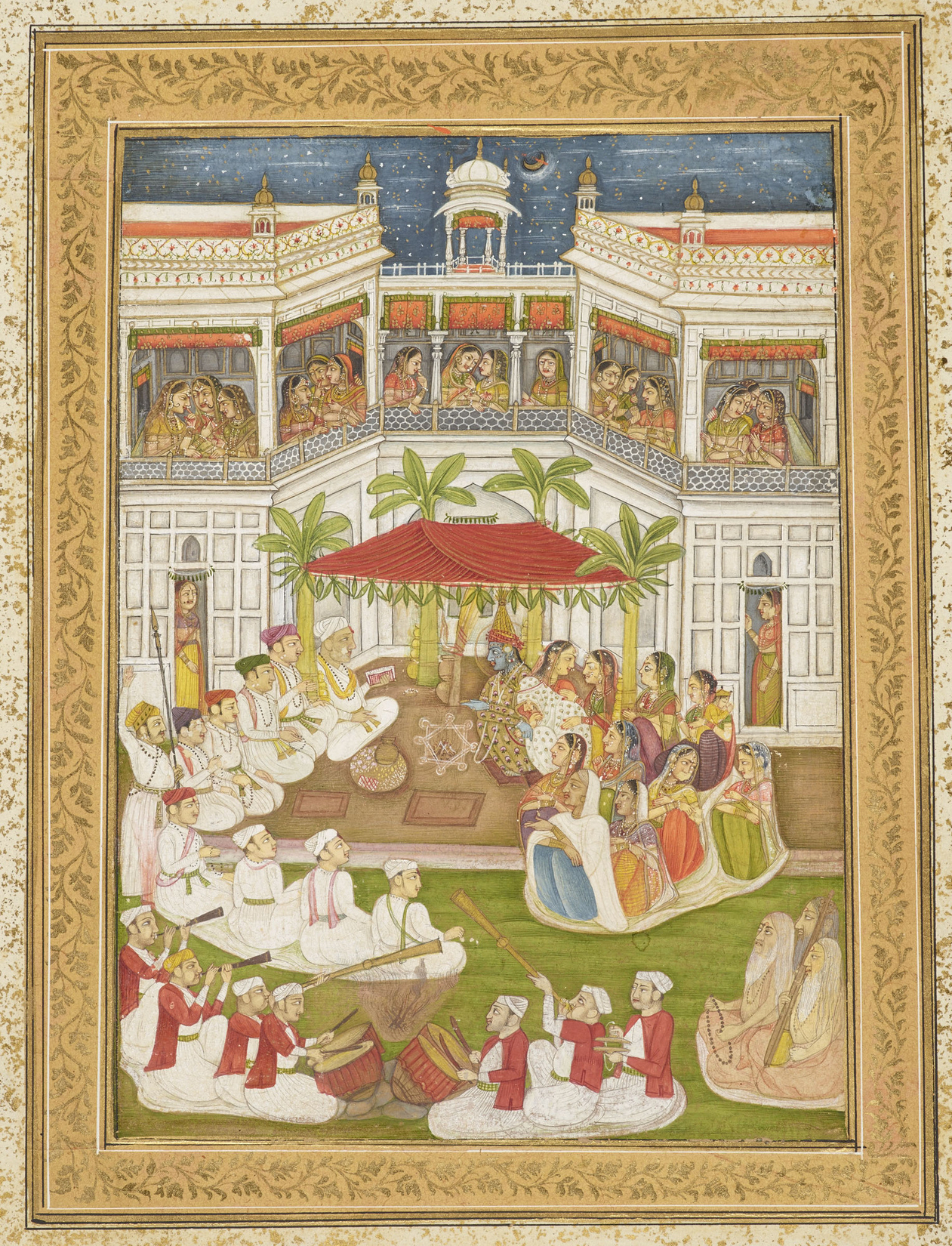
- Late 18th century painting of the wedding of Krishna and Rukmini

Information
- Religion: Hinduism
- Author: Vedanta Desika
- Language: Sanskrit
- Chapters: 24

The Yadavabhyudaya (Sanskrit: यादवाभ्युदयम्, romanized: Yādavābhyudayam) is a Sanskrit mahakavya (i.e., epic poem) by the Hindu Srivaisnava polymath, theologian and poet, Vedanta Desika. Written in the fourteenth century CE, the work consists of 24 cantos that describe the complete life of Krishna as well as the lineage of the Yadava race, including his childhood in Gokul, his royal progress and family life, as well as his participation in the Kurukshetra War. It draws its primary narrative framework from the Harivamsa and Puranic traditions, revering Krishna as a great cosmic deity.

The Yadavabhyudaya is regarded to be a significant work of medieval Sanskrit poetry. The work is celebrated both for its high poetic artistry. It holds the rare distinction of being offered a flattering commentary composed in the sixteenth century CE by the philosopher Appayya Dikshita, who belonged to the Advaita school of thought. Modern Indological scholarship considers the epic one of the masterpieces of post-classical Sanskrit poetry.

== Structure and content ==
Described by Indologist Edwin Bryant as an encyclopedic treatment of the Krishna-katha (i.e., narrative) and lila (i.e., divine play), the Yadavabhyudaya spans 24 cantos (i.e., sargas) that weave together themes of love, separation, heroism, eroticism, and various form of rasa (i.e., aesthetic experience) within a narrative framework primarily derived from the Harivamsa and Puranic traditions. The poem opens in Canto 1 with a number of laudatory stotras (i.e., eulogies). The first few cantos narrate the pregnancy of Devaki, Krishna's mother, the birth of the deity, and his arrival to Gokul. The defeat of Putana, Keshi, Kaliya, as well as other malicious beings are recounted. In cantos 5 and 6, the narrative provides an elaborate illustration of the six seasons, presenting them as tempral manifestation of the Supreme Being that bring delight to the denizens of Vrindavan. Cantos 7 and 8 relate the legend of Krishna lifting the hill Govardhana and his rasa-lila, his dance with the milkmaids called the gopis. The poem then describes the arrival of Akrura and Krishna's journey to Mathura, where he slays his tyrannical uncle Kamsa.

Following Krishna's establishment of his kingship in Dvaraka, Canto 13 opens with his dramatic meeting with Princess Rukmini at the temple of Saci on the eve of her intenses marriage to Sisupala. This canto features detailed descriptions of Vedic marriage rites composed after the classical style of Kalidasa, as well as a celebrated passafe (verses 44-71) depicting the ladies of Dvaraka rushing in eager haste to catch a glimpse of Krishna returning with his new bride. This scene directly recalls Banabhatta's depiction of Prince Candrapida entering the capital in the Kadambari. Cantos 14 through 18 eloquate Krishna's marital alliances, including his union with Satyabhama, the vanquishing of Narakasura, and his royal progress. Canto 18 culminates in a vivid description of Krishna's aerial return journey to Dvaraka from Indra's celestial gardens in heaven, bearing the divine Parijataka tree.

The final quarter of the epic details Krishna's royal progress and his broader cosmic role, including a brief account of the Kurukshetra War and his teaching of the Bhagavad Gita. Subsequent cantos feature cosmic hymns of praise by major deities, most notably Canto 20 (verses 79-86), wherein Siva glorifies Krishna, declaring that while Brahma arose from Krishna's grace, Siva himself received his cosmic charge of destruction from Krishna's anger. The poem concludes in Canto 24 with a portrait of Krishna leading the life of an ideal householder alongside numerous queens Dvaraka.

== Poetic style ==
In the Yadavabhyudaya, Vedanta Desika integrates theology with classical Sanskrit aesthetic theory. In the opening canto, the author defines true poetic mastery, stating that a genuine poet is one in whom Goddess Sarasvati delights when poetic figures (i.e., alamkara) and structural qualities (i.e., guna) remain subordinate to suggested emotional sentiment (i.e., rasa and bhava). The poem also reflects on the relationship between ancient and contemporary poetry, observing that all literature consists of new arrangements of pre-existing linguistic elements. Throughout the work, Vedanta Desika demonstrates a command of classical Sanskrit meters, complex figures of speech, and the play of aesthetic sentiments, particularly the heroic (i.e., vira) and devotional sentiments.

== Excerpt ==
The traditional first propitious hymn of the work, called the mangalashloka, venerates Krishna:

vande bṛndāvana vallavī janavallabham
jayantī sambhavam dhāma vaijayantī vibhūṣaṇam

To the one born on the occasion of Jayanti, the one who moves freely around Vrindavana, the darling of the gopis, the one who is adorned by the Vaijayanti, I offer my salutations

This hymn was originally featured in one of the author's other works on Krishna, the Gopalavimshati.

== Commentary by Appayya Diksita ==
The Yadavabhudaya occupies a unique place in Indian literary history due to its masterly commentary (i.e., vyakhya) composed by Appayya Diksita (1520-1592 CE), the preeeminent Saiva non-dualist intellectual from Adaiyapalam. Appayya Diksita wrote this comprehensive commentary during his youth at the request of his patron, King Cinna Timmaraja, a feudatory ruler affiliated with the Aravidu line of Vijayanagara. Cantos 1 through 9 of the commentary contain an elaborate royal panegyric (i.e., prasasti) detailing the pedigree and achievements of Timmaraja, which remains the only formal royal eulogy Appayya Diksita ever authored.

Despite being an ardent proponent of Saivism, Appayya Diksita held Vendanta desika in immense personal and intellectual esteem, honoring im with the title sarvatantrasvatantra (i.e., independent from all [philosophical] systems) and praising him as a kavitarkikasimha (i.e., lion among poets and logicians). In commenting on the Yadavabhyudaya, Appayya Diksita maintained complete exegetical fidelity to the text's Srivaisnava framework. Even in passages where the poem subordinates Siva to Visnu, Appayya Diksita provides a faithful gloss and cites corroborating verses from the Mahabharata rather than disputing the narrative. His commentary is noted for its erudition, featuring citations from Sanskrit grammar, poetics, drama, prosody, Sruti, Upanishads, epics, Puranas and Smrtis.

== Publication and modern reception ==
The Yadavabhudaya has been preserved and published across several critical editions. Early printed volumes covering Cantos 1-12 with commentary were published by the Vani Vilasa Press in Srirangam. Cantos 13 through 18 with Appayya Diksita's commentary were critically edited by TT Shrinvas Gopalachar and published by the Oriental Library at the University of Mysore in 1944. Subsequent critical editions and translations include those edited by Uttamur T Viraraghavacharya for the Ubhaya Vedanta Grantha Mala (1969) and a multi-volume publication by the Vedanta Desika Research Society in Madras (1976), which featured introductory essays by scholars alongside an English translation. Modern Indological scholarship considers the epic one of the masterpieces of post-classical Sanskrit poetry.
