= Dayashataka =

Hindu hymn about Venkateshvara

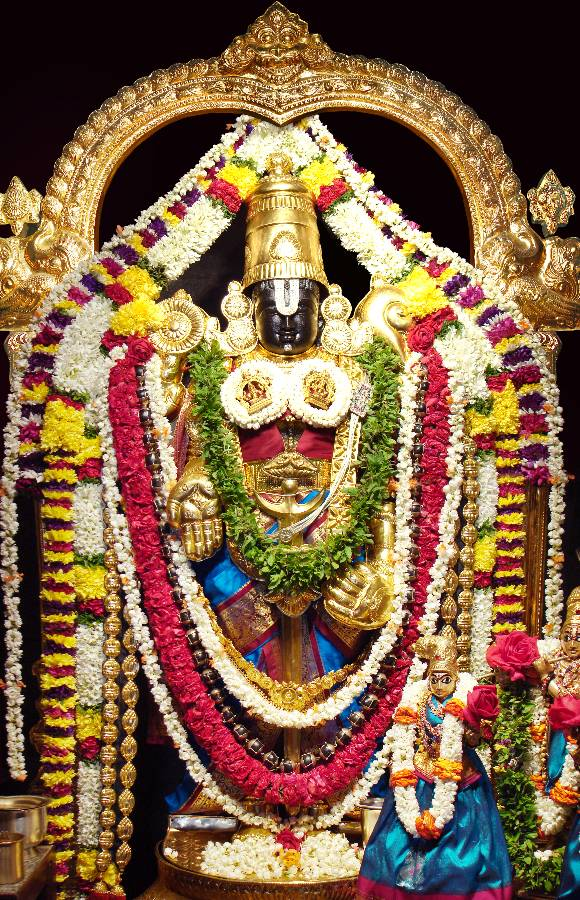
- Murti of Venkateshvara.

Information
- Religion: Hinduism
- Author: Vedanta Desika
- Language: Sanskrit
- Verses: 100

The Dayashataka (Sanskrit: दयाशतकम्, romanized: Dayāśatakam) is a Sanskrit hymn composed by the Hindu philosopher Vedanta Desika. Comprising one hundred verses in ten decads, the hymn was written in praise of Venkateshvara, a form of Vishnu who is the principal deity of the Venkateshvara Temple, Tirupati.

== Etymology ==
Dayshataka is Sanskrit for "centum on mercy".

== Content ==
The first decad of this work is composed in the anustubh metre of Sanskrit poetry. The poet offers his obeisance to the Venkata hill, upon which the Venkateshvara Temple stands, as well as his preceptors and the major deities of the Sri Vaishnava tradition. The second decad is composed in the giti metre and describes the ati-bhogya-tva, the enjoyable qualities of God. The third decad is composed in the upachandasika metre, centred around the śubhā-śubhaga-tanuḥ, the auspicious and attractive body of the deity. The fourth decad is composed in the malini metre, addressing the atiśaya, the excellence of the deity. The fifth decad is written in the mandakranta metre, addressing the śreyastaddhetu-dātā, the attribute of the deity as the granter of good fortune. The sixth decad uses the nardaṭaka metre, exploring the prapadana-sulabhatva, the ease of the attainment of the deity. The seventh decad employs the shikharini metre, elucidating the welfare offered by the deity's mercy. The eighth decad is composed in the harini metre, discussing the bhakta-chandānuvartī, the mentality of the devotee. The ninth decad is composed in the prithvi metre, discussing the various forms of the deity. The tenth decad is composed in the vasantatilaka metre, discussing the satpādarvyām-sahāyaḥ, or seeking the help of the deity towards the right path.

== Theme ==
In the Dayashataka, Vedanta Desika extols the attribute of dayā (mercy) of Venkateshvara as the deity's supreme attribute, greater than his attributes of aiśvarya (sovereignty) and jñāna (wisdom). The mercy of the deity is described to allow a devotee to attain God when it is received as a blessing. The dayā of Venkateshvara is also personified as a goddess named Dayādevi (goddess mercy), conceived as one of the consorts of the deity, along with Sridevi, Bhudevi, and Niladevi, the three aspects of Lakshmi in Sri Vaishnavism. The goddess Dayādevi is regarded to be the source of the murti (image) of the deity upon Tirumala; the murti is stated to have metaphysically originated from her grace to offer the deity's salvation to the world.

== Hymn ==
The first hymn of the work extols the Venkata hill, upon which the Venkateshvara Temple stands:

prapadye tam giriṁ prāyaḥ Śrīnivāsa-anukampayā
ikṣusāra-sravantyeva yanmūrtyā sarkarāyitā

— Dayashataka, Verse 1

I resort to that hill, which in all probability, is the solidified form of sugarcane juice, which is the mercy of Srinivasa

== See also ==
- Chatuh Shloki
- Garuda Dandaka
- Suprabhatam
