= Kanakadhara Stotra =

Hindu hymn about Lakshmi

Information
- Religion: Hinduism
- Author: Adi Shankara
- Language: Sanskrit
- Verses: 22

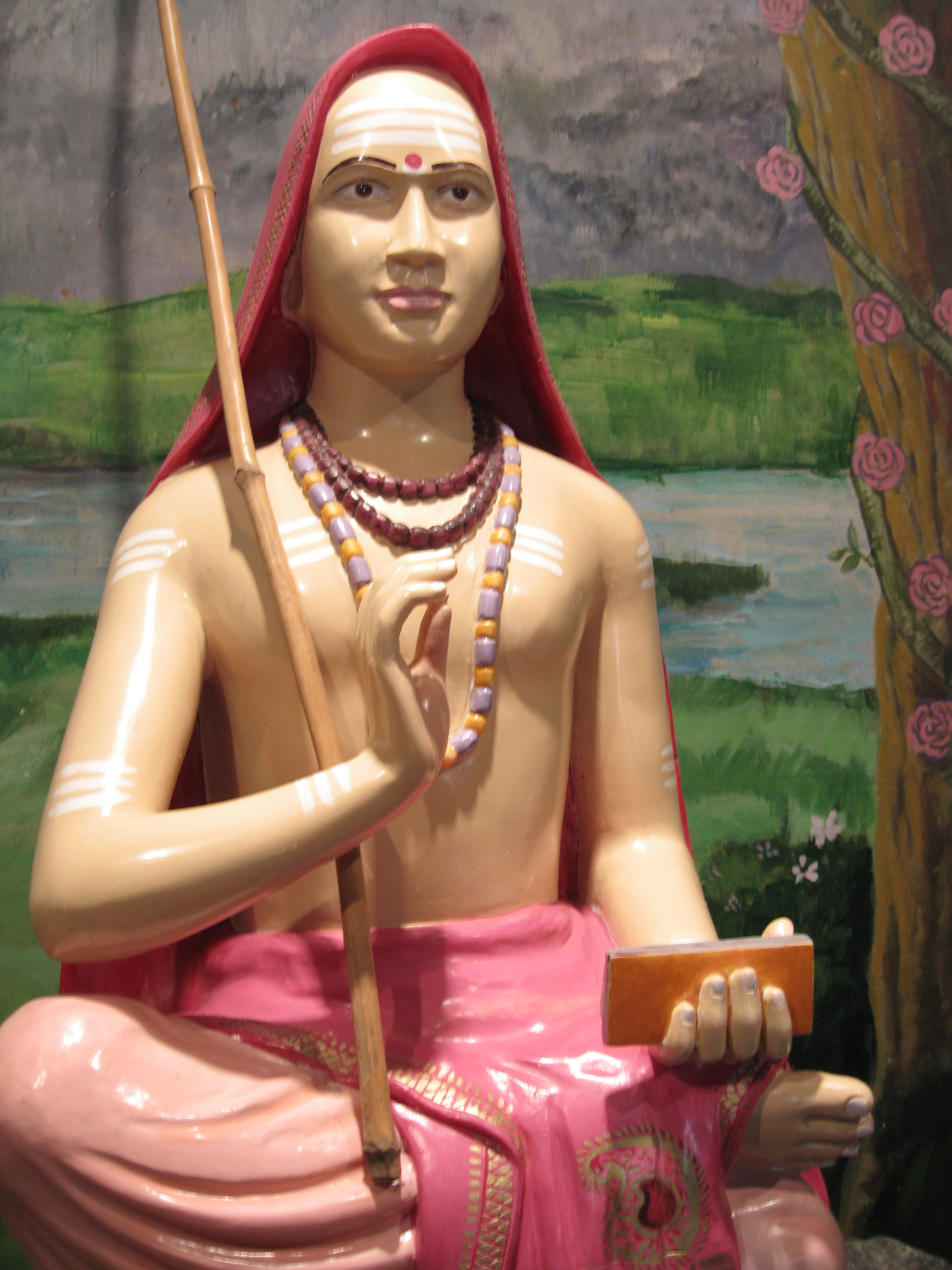
Statue of Adi Shankara, the composer of this hymn

The Kanakadhara Stotra (Sanskrit: कनकधारा स्तोत्रम्, romanized: Kanakadhārāstotram) is a Hindu hymn (stotram) attributed by tradition to Adi Shankara.

== Etymology ==
Kanakadhārā means "the stream (dhārā) of gold (kanaka)", and the hymn is called by this name since legend has it that when Adi Shankara recited it, the goddess Lakshmi showered a stream of gold within the hut of his poor Brahmana benefactor.

== Description ==
The hymn is attributed to Adi Shankara. According to tradition, as a young boy, Adi Shankara was out seeking alms to prepare his lunch and happened upon the doorstep of a very poor Brahmana woman. Having nothing edible in her home, the lady frantically searched her house, only to find a single gooseberry fruit, which she then offered to Shankara. Shankara was so moved by the incredible selflessness of this woman that he burst forth into poetry and sang 22 stanzas in praise of the goddess Lakshmi. Pleased by the beauty of the hymn, the goddess instantly showered the lady's house with gooseberries made of pure gold.

=== Hymn ===
The first hymn of the Kanakadhara Stotra is as follows:

aṅgaṃ hareḥ pulaka-bhūṣaṇam āśrayantī
bhṛṅgāṅganeva mukulābharaṇaṃ tamālam |
aṅgīkṛtākhila vibhūtir-apāṅgalīlā
mā-galyadāstu mama maṅgala-devatāyāḥ

— Kanakadhara Stotra, Verse 1

May Her glance, who abides in the body of Śrī Hari (who wears supreme happiness as ornament), just as the bees takes shelter in the profusely blossomed (buds) Tamāla tree, Who is the abode of all superhuman powers, and Who is all auspiciousness, be auspicious to me.

== See also ==
- Ashtalakshmi Stotra
- Sri Stuti
- Sri Sukta
