= Kidambi =

Kidambi is an Indian surname. The other variants are Cadambi, Cidambi or Kadambi. The most common of the variants is Kidambi – this is the closest to Kilambi, the Tamil word.

== Kidambis in Srivaishnavism ==
While the Srivaishnava traditional history and commentaries reveal several preceptors with the surname ‘Kidambi’, and the earliest among them being Kidambi Aacchan, very little is known about the background and history of this lineage of Brahmins.

== Notable people ==
- Chethan Kadambi, actor
- Srikanth Kidambi, an Indian badminton player
- Prashant Kidambi, historian
