= Sri Stuti =

Hindu hymn

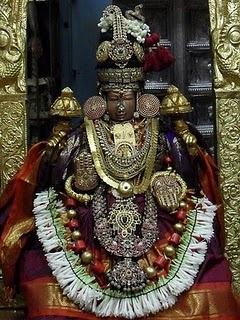
- Murti of Perundevi (Lakshmi) of Kanchipuram, the addressee of the hymn according to some accounts

Information
- Religion: Hinduism
- Author: Vedanta Desika
- Language: Sanskrit
- Verses: 25

The Sri Stuti (Sanskrit: श्रीस्तुति, romanized: Śrīstuti) is a Sanskrit hymn written by the Hindu philosopher Vedanta Desika. Comprising 25 verses, the work is an ode to the goddess Lakshmi (Sri).

== Etymology ==
In Sanskrit, sri denotes prosperity and is another name of the goddess Lakshmi, and stuti is translated as a hymn.

== Legend ==
According to the Sri Vaishnava narrative, Vedanta Desika was once approached by a young man. The man requested Desika's financial aid for arranging his wedding ceremony. Since the philosopher was poor himself, he decided to help the man by composing the Sri Stuti. After he had finished singing the hymn in praise of Lakshmi, gold coins showered around the man, a blessing of the goddess. It is said that the philosopher's detachment from materialism was such that he walked away from the scene, never glancing once at the gold coins.

== Description ==
The Sri Stuti is composed in the mandakranta metre of Sanskrit poetry. It is regarded to have been inspired by the identically titled work composed by the philosopher Yamunacharya. While the work itself does not state a city of origin, the traditional biographies of Vedanta Desika claim that the hymn was composed in Srirangam, while the Sri Vaishnavas of Kanchipuram claim that it was composed in their city.

In the hymn, the goddess is described to be the most auspicious of the auspicious; this attribute is stated to be the source of the auspiciousness and purity of her consort Vishnu, as she is regarded to spiritually reside in him. She is also praised for her generosity, one verse stating that wherever her playful eyes wander, there various forms of riches compete to flourish.

== Hymn ==
The first hymn of the work extols the attributes of Lakshmi:

mānātīta prathita vibhavāṁ maṅgalaṁ maṅgalānāṁ
vakṣaḥ pīṭhīṁ madhuvijayino bhūṣayantīṁ svakāntyā
pratyakṣānu śravika mahimā prārthinīnāṁ prajānāṁ
śreyo mūrtiṁ śriyam aśaraṇa tvāṁ śaraṇyāṁ prapadhye

— Sri Stuti, Verse 1

She who is renowned for her fortune, she who is the most auspicious of the auspicious
She who decorates her seat, the chest of the one who achieved victory over Madhu (Vishnu), with her lustre
She who beholds and offers greatness to the devotees who pray to her
She who has the form of prosperity and is the refuge of the helpless, to her I surrender

== See also ==
- Chatuh Shloki
- Ashtalakshmi Stotra
- Lakshmi Stuti
