= Vedanta Desika =

Indian philosopher, polymath, and Vaishnava guru (1268–1369)

Personal life
- Born: Venkatanathan; 1268 CE Thoopul (Thiruthanka) (present-day Kanchipuram District, Tamil Nadu, India)
- Died: 1369
- Notable work(s): Paduka Sahasra, Yadavabhyudaya, Dayashataka, Sri Stuti, Garuda Dandaka, Shatadushani, Hamsa Sandesha, Hayagriva Stotra
- Honors: Sarvatantra Svatantrar, Kavitarkiga Simham, Vedantacharyar

Religious life
- Religion: Hinduism
- Philosophy: Ramanuja's Vishistadvaita

Religious career
- Teacher: Atreya Ramanuja

Vedanta Desika (c. 1269–1370), also rendered Vedanta Desikan, Swami Vedanta Desika, and Thoopul Nigamantha Desikan, was an Indian polymath who wrote philosophical as well as religious and poetical works in several languages, including Sanskrit, Manipravaḷam (a Sanskritised form of literary Tamil), Tamil and Prakrit. He was an Indian philosopher, Sri Vaishnava guru, and one of the most brilliant stalwarts of Sri Vaishnavism in the post-Ramanuja period. He was a Hindu devotee, poet, Master of Acharyas (desikan) and a logician and mathematician. He was the disciple of Kidambi Appullar, also known as Athreya Ramanujachariar, whose lineage can be traced to Ramanuja. Vedanta Desika is considered an avatar (incarnation) of the divine bell of Venkateshvara of Tirumala. He is revered as an the most important guru of the Vadakalai sect of Sri Vaishnavism. He belongs to Vishvamitra/Kaushika gotra.

== Biography ==
Vedanta Desika, also known as Veṅkaṭanātha, was born in present-day Tamil Nadu in a city called Tūppul. His maternal uncle and teacher was Ātreya Rāmānuja, who is part of the lineage of disciples beginning with Ramanuja and had authored the text known as Nyayakuliśa. Vedanta Desika studied under him until he was 20. After finishing his studies, he married Tirumangai and had a son with her at 46.

== Philosophy ==
Vedanta Desika significantly shaped Vishishtadvaita Vedanta by integrating the philosophical insights of Purva Mimamsa and Uttara Mimamsa, aligning ritual and metaphysics within Vedic orthodoxy. He positioned Purva Mimamsa (Mimamsa, focused on ritual and ethics) as foundational to Uttara Mimamsa (Vedanta, focused on ultimate reality). Desika used Mimamsa's interpretive methods to blend Vedic and Pancharatra traditions, showing them as unified.

Desika upheld the Alvars' devotional elements by incorporating Tamil hymnology and Pancharatra theologies, making devotion a central aspect of philosophical discourse. His work solidified and expanded Ramanuja's teachings and refined Vishistadvaita as a balanced system of metaphysics, devotion, and ritual continuity.

Desika composed his poems in various poetic metres. Vedic literature is written in the form of hymns set rhythmically to different metres, called 'chandas'. Each metre is governed by the number of syllables specific to it. Poets are expected to conform to these norms in their compositions. Desika has employed 22 metres in the 862 verses he composed on presiding deities of various temples in India. The following are some of the compositions of Vedanta Desika that provide a glimpse of his mastery over poetry, logic, grammar and philosophy

More than 100 works written in Sanskrit and Maṇipravāḷa are attributed to him. These include independent works, such as the Tattvamuktākalāpa, the Nyāyasiddhāñjana, and the Śatadūṣaṇī, and also commentaries on other texts. One of the main subjects that Vedanta Desika discusses in his theological texts such as the Tātparyacandrikā, his subcommentary on Ramanuja's commentary on the Bhagavad Gita, and the Nikseparaksa is self-surrender (prapatti). He also wrote texts focusing on other schools, including a treatise on Mimamsa known as Seśvaramīmāṃsā, in which he presents a theistic Mimamsa, and on Nyaya known as Nyāyapariśuddhi. He sought to offer a synthesis of Pūrva Mīmāṃsā and Uttara Mīmāṃsā (or Vedānta), portraying them as a single system. Some argue that his worship of Hayagriva, for whom he wrote a eulogy (stotra), can be traced to his support of Pūrva Mīmāṃsā. Hayagriva, a form of Vishnu, is traditionally linked with the Vedas, which is the focus of the Pūrva Mīmāṃsā tradition.

=== Prapatti ===
Prapatti, for Vedanta Desika, refers to the act of completely taking refuge at the feet of God, or surrendering to God. Since bhakti is connected with the Vedic ritualist path, those who are unable to access the Vedic path cannot practice it. This makes prapatti a path for everyone, even those who do not participate in Vedic rituals. The process of prapatti involves cultivating immense despair of one's capacity to attain God.

Ramanuja primarily discusses bhakti, without emphasizing the independent role of prapatti, and it is with Vedanta Desika that prapatti becomes an independent path to liberation. Commenting on Bhagavad Gita 18.66,

Having abandoned all duties (dharma), come to me alone as your refuge. I will free you from all evils, don’t grieve.

Vedanta Desika says that "the same [abandonment] should apply also to the rituals among the fixed and occasional ones that can hardly be performed". Prapatti requires giving up even any sense of individual agency and surrendering entirely to God.

=== Soul ===
Within the Vishishtadvaita school of Vedānta, existing things are distributed into three categories (tattvatraya): insentient, sentient, or God. God is understood as inseparably connected (apṛthaksiddhi) with the other two categories, which are the "body" (śarīra) of God and God is their inner-ruler (antaryāmin). God is inseparable from them in the sense that God "always exists in relational unity with" them.

According to Vedanta Desika, the soul, or individual self, is consciousness, which is understood as self-luminosity (svayaṃprakāśa). This applies to both the individual self and God: "The essential nature of all souls in the form of the individual self and God is self-luminosity for itself." It is the referent of the world "I". His argument for this is that everyone agrees that being inward is a property of the self, and it is not possible for the self to be inward without being the referent of "I". Other properties of the self including its being subordinate to God, being atomic in size, and being the knower.

== Reception ==
On the occasion of 750th anniversary of the life of Vedanta Desika, the Indian postal department unveiled a stamp to commemorate his life and works. The stamp was unveiled by Venkaiah Naidu, Vice President of India in May 2019.

== See also ==
- List of Sanskrit plays in English translation
- Manavala Mamunigal

== Sources ==
- * Iyyangar, V.R. (1981). Venkatesa and Vedanta Desika Dayasatakam: With Meaning and Commentary by V. Rangaswamy Iyyangar. Rangaswamy Iyyangar. p. 4.
