= Prayer in Hinduism =

Integral part of the Hinduism

Prayer in Hinduism includes personal and communal prayer, recitation, chanting, hymns and meditation. Depending on the context and tradition, prayer may include mantras, sacred names, devotional songs or silent prayer. These practices can differ in form and purpose across Hindu traditions, and prayer may be practised alongside worship, ritual, recitation and meditation.

== Etymology ==
The Sanskrit word prārthanā (Sanskrit: प्रार्थना) can mean prayer, request, entreaty, petition, supplication or desire.

In A Practical Sanskrit Dictionary, Arthur Anthony Macdonell lists prārthana as a neuter noun and prārthanā as the more common feminine form. Both forms have the same meanings.

== Prayer and worship ==
As a religious practice, prayer occurs in private and domestic settings and may also form part of public and communal worship. In some North Indian Vaishnava traditions, prayer forms part of temple worship through devotional music and singing in groups.

Prayer is not necessarily the same as reciting a mantra. In Mimaṃsa interpretations of Vedic ritual, mantras perform prescribed roles within sacrificial rites and bring the relevant deity to mind. Purushottama Bilimoria cautions that describing these ritual uses as prayer or worship may be a “category mistake”. Here in this context, a “category mistake” means incorrectly describing a practice with a different ritual purpose as prayer. Mantras may be used in prayer and worship, but mantra recitation is not always a form of prayer.

== Forms of prayer ==
Prayer in Hindu tradition is connected with ritual worship (puja) and devotion (bhakti). Scholars note that Hinduism lays importance on following rituals and practices (orthopraxy) than just on beliefs or religious doctrines. Therefore, prayer is usually not practiced separately from religious rituals. Devotional prayer is expressed through activities such as offerings during puja, repeating sacred words or mantras (japa), singing devotional songs (bhajan or kīrtan), and meditation (dhyāna).

=== Puja ===
Puja is the primary ritual activity in contemporary Hinduism. It consists of offering vegetarian items, such as flowers, incense, light, water, fruit, and cooked food, to a deity represented by an icon or image (murti). Puja is conducted in private domestic shrines as well as in public temples (mandir) by householders or priests (pujari). Elaborate temple puja follows established sequences recorded in medieval manuals (paddhati) and Agamic/Tantric scriptures.

Puja may include several ritual practices:

- Abhiseka: The ritual bathing and anointing of the image with substances such as sesame oil, milk, curd, ghee, or honey.
- Adornment: Dressing the deity in garments, garlands, and sacred powders (kunkuma, sandlewood paste, or sacred ash).
- Naivedya /Bhoga: Offering cooked food or sweets to the deity.
- Arati: the waving of lighted oil lamps or burning camphor before the image accompanied by hymns, ringing bells and music.

During puja, the prayers and chants used are:

- Sacred Mantras and seed Syllables: Priests and worshippers recite mantras -sacred verses believed to possess inherent power- during key ritual stages like anointing the images (abhiseka) and arati. These recitations incorporate the primary seed syllable (bija) Om.
- Diety-Specific invocations and vedic verses: Diety-specific chants, such as the Saiva mantra- Om Namah Śivāya or the Vaisnava- Hare Krsna mantra and the vedic texts like the Gāyatrī Mantra
- Devotional Music(Bhajan and Kīrtan): Ritual offerings are accompanied by congregational singing of devotional hymns(bhajans and kīrtan).

=== Mantra and Japa ===
A mantra is a word, phrase or verse, predominantly in sanskrit, recited for ritual, spiritual or protective purposes. The repetitive recitation of a mantra is known as japa. There are three modes of japa: silent or mental repetition(manasika), vocal recitation, and written repetition. Silent or mental repetition(manasika) is generally practiced in meditation using a rosary(mala) to count the recitations. In vocal recitation, mantra is chanted aloud or whispered. Written repetition involves writing a selected mantra repeatedly in dedicated notebooks.

Key mantras recited are: Om (Aum), the primary seed syllable(bija), regarded in the Upnishads as the acoustic expression of the absolute reality (brahman); the Gayatri Mantra, a sacred vedic verse (Rigveda 3.62.10) addressed to Savitr; and sectarian mantras that are deity-specific invocations, such as Saiva and Vaisnava mantra

=== Bhajan and kirtan ===
Devotional prayer is central to the bhakti(loving devotion) traditions of Hinduism. Bhakti emphasizes on an emotional relationship between the worshipper and a personal deity(ista-devata).

Devotional prayer can take several musical forms like bhajan, kirtan and stotra. A bhajan is a hymn of praise sung individually or collectively, often accompanied by musical instruments. A kirtan involves congregational singing and chanting of divine names and verses.A stotra is a verse of praise composed in sanskrit or regional vernacular. One such stotra is Satarudriya (hundred names of Rudra), an ancient vedic hymn still recited in Saiva temples. Sivasahasranamam is another strotra with 1008 titles of Lord Shiva. It is believed that recitation of this strotra frees one from sins.

=== Dhyana ===
In addition to verbal and ritual offerings, prayer includes internal contemplative practice(dhyana). In the Upanisads, early theologians reinterpreted external vedic fire sacrifices into internal mental offerings(pranagnihotra), treating contemplation of the inner self(atman) as the true sacrifice.Patanjali's Yogasutra codifies dhyana as the seventh step of the eight-fold path(astangayoga).

=== Yajna and homa ===
Originating in the ancient Vedic period, yajna or homa involves making offerings of ghee, grains, into a consecrated sacred fire. During the homa, priests chant hymns from the Rigveda, Samveda and Yajurveda corresponding to each physical oblation into the fire. Offerings of ghee or grains into the sacred fire are also accompanied by repetitions of deity-specific mantras.

== Bhakti yoga ==
Bhakti is commonly understood as devotion to a personal deity, although the term has been interpreted in different ways. In the Bhagavad Gita, bhakti is described as a form of worship and a path to liberation. Karen Pechilis Prentiss argues that regional-language traditions resulted to the development of their own distinct forms of bhakti.

Devotion is a central theme in Chapters 7 to 12 of the Bhagavad Gita. According to Sutton, these chapters (7 - 12) present Krishna as the supreme deity and devotion to him as a path to liberation from rebirth. Chapter 12 explores Krishna’s relationship with his devotees and the importance of divine grace.

In Hindu mysticism, a spoken prayer is understood to facilitate progressive spiritual absorption. The 15th-16th century mystic Chaitanya, structured this progression into five stages of bhakti(devotion) based on emotional relationship with God. These stages are: santa(peaceful love), dasya(servant of God), sakhya(friendship with God), vatsalya(filial attitude towards God) and madhurya(love of God as one's lover).

== Mantras ==
=== Gayatri mantra ===
The Gayatri mantra is Hinduism's most representative prayer. Many Hindus recite it on a daily basis, not only contemplating its straightforward meaning, but also dwelling on and imbibing its sound, regarded to be pregnant with spiritual meaning. For this reason nearly all Hindu prayers and mantras are sung. The Gayatri mantra was first recorded in the Rigveda (Note: Rigveda 3.62.10) which was composed in Sanskrit about 2500 to 3500 years ago, and by some reports, the mantra may have been chanted for many generations before that.

Om! Earth, Sky, Heaven.
We meditate on the
brilliant light of the Sun:
May it illuminate our minds!

— Rigveda 3.62.10

Ōṃ bhūr bhuvaḥ svaḥ
tat savitur vareṇyaṃ
bhargo devasya dhīmahi
dhiyo yo naḥ pracodayāt.

ॐ भूर्भुवस्व:
तत्सवितुर्वरेण्यम् ।
भर्गो देवस्य धीमहि ।
धियो यो न: प्रचोदयात् ॥

== Perspectives ==
Mahatma Gandhi stated that:

"Prayer is the very soul and essence of religion, and therefore prayer must be the very core of the life of man."
