= Ashtalakshmi Stotra =

Hindu mantra

Information
- Religion: Hinduism
- Author: U.V. Srinivasa Varadachariyar
- Language: Sanskrit
- Verses: 32

The Ashtalakshmi Stotra (Sanskrit: अष्टलक्ष्मीस्तोत्रम्, romanized: Aṣṭalakṣmīstotraṃ), also rendered the Ashta Lakshmi Stotram, is a Hindu mantra. It extols the eight aspects of the goddess Lakshmi, designated as the Ashta Lakshmi, regarded to represent the eight forms of wealth.

== Description ==
The Ashtalakshmi Stotra was composed and published in the early 1970s in Chennai by U.V. Srinivasa Varadachariyar, a theologian of the Sri Vaishnava tradition. The hymn was popularised through its distribution via audiocassettes in the 1980s. Devotees regard each of the Ashta Lakshmi to represent an attribute of Lakshmi, gaining the favour of the goddess with the chanting of each stanza of the prayer. The eight aspects of Lakshmi that are venerated by the mantra are:

1. Adi Lakshmi (lit. 'primeval Lakshmi')
2. Dhanya Lakshmi (lit. 'grain Lakshmi')
3. Dhairya Lakshmi (lit. 'fearless Lakshmi')
4. Gaja Lakshmi (lit. 'elephant Lakshmi')
5. Santana Lakshmi (lit. 'progeny Lakshmi')
6. Vijaya Lakshmi (lit. 'victorious Lakshmi')
7. Vidya Lakshmi (lit. 'knowledge Lakshmi')
8. Dhana Lakshmi (lit. 'wealth Lakshmi')

== Hymn ==
The first hymn of the mantra venerates Adi Lakshmi:

sumanasavandita sundari mādhavi candrasahodari hēmamayē
munigaṇavandita mokṣapradāyani mañjula bhāṣiṇi vēdanutē
paṅkajavāsini dēvasupūjita sadguṇavarṣiṇi śāntiyutē
jaya jaya hē madhusūdanakāmini ādilakṣmi sadā pālaya mām

— Ashtalakshmi Stotra, Verse 1

She who is praised by the virtuous, she who is beautiful, she who is the consort of Madhava and the sister of Chandra, the golden one
She who is praised by the sages and their disciples, she who offers salvation, she who is of pleasant speech and hailed by the Vedas
She who resides upon a lotus, she who is worshipped by the devas, she who showers auspicious qualities and contentment
Victory to you, victory to you, the lover of Madhusudana, Adi Lakshmi, may you always protect me

== See also ==
- Kanakadhara Stotra
- Sri Stuti
- Lakshmi Stuti
