= Rasasvada =

Indian philosophy

In Indian philosophy, Rasāsvāda refers to the taste of bliss in the absence of all thought which is an obstacle in the path leading to Nirvikalpa Samādhi. Rasasvada means one gets a power of healing or a power of knowing the mind which gives enjoyment but this enjoyment is superficial enjoyment or happiness which should not be sought while seeking Truth.

== Obstacles to Samadhi and their removal ==
Indian thought has identified four obstacles in the path leading to Nirvikalpa Samādhi , they are – laya (torpidity), vikṣepa (distraction), kāśaya (attachment) and rasāsvāda (enjoyment). Sadananda explains that Laya is the lapse of the mental state into sleep because of the failure to rest on the Absolute. Vikṣepa is the resting of the mental state on things other than the Absolute, because of the failure to rest on It. Kāśaya is the failure of the mental state to rest on the Absolute, owing to the numbness brought on by impressions due to attachment even when there is no torpidity or distraction. But with regard to Rasāsvāda, Sadananda tells the followers of Advaita Vedanta:-

अखण्डवस्त्वनवलम्बनेनापि चित्तवृत्तेः सविकल्पकानन्दस्वादनं रसास्वादः |
समाध्यारम्भसमये सविकल्पकानन्दस्वादनं वा ||२१३||

that enjoyment (rasāsvāda) is the tasting by the mental state of the bliss of Savikalpa Samadhi owing to the failure to rest on the Absolute; or it may mean continuing to taste the bliss of Savikalpa Samādhi while taking up the Nirvikalpa Samādhi. in this context, Swami Nikhilananda clarifies that the bliss here is the bliss which is lower than that obtained through the Nirvikalpa Samādhi, and the term "continuing" is indicative of not having the strength to give up, as it should.

== Distinction between Rasasvada and Brahmasvada ==
Indian thinkers had come to classify Consciousness as "Aesthetic consciousness" and "Mystical consciousness" but according to Abhinavagupta there is no distinction between rasāsvāda (aesthetic consciousness) and brahmasvāda (mystical consciousness), both are at par. Masson and Patawardhan have presented thirteen similarities that Abhinavagupta had found – 1) everything is blissful in the state of rasa, 2) one forgets own presence, 3) there is no material gain, 4) both experiences are aloukika (transcendental), 5) both experiences are ānandaikaghana (bliss of unity); 6) in both, distance between subject and object is removed, 7) time and space disappear during the experience of both, 8) there is total immersion, 9) special preparation is necessary, 10) rasa is not produced but suggested and Brahman is only a question of removal of ignorance, 11) obstacles must be removed to experience rasa and Brahman, 12) in both cases there is a sense of rest of having reached the goal beyond which there is nothing to be accomplished, and 13) the aesthetic experience or the mystical experience are not the ultimate goals.

== Doctrine of Rasa in Sanskrit literature ==
The Rasa doctrine of literature is based on two premises – i) that literary works, as verbal compositions, express emotive meanings and ii) that all literature is typically emotive discourse or discourse that has to do with the portrayal of feelings and attitudes rather than with ideas, concepts, statements of universal truth and so forth. The first premise raises philosophical questions with regard to kind of entities of emotions, their objective or ontological status, recognition, modes of expression, etc. The second premise relates to the problem of defining literature. Rasa, originally propounded by Bharata and which is multifaceted, is the most important concept in Sanskrit criticism and has influenced the theories of dance and the visual arts; this term means – aesthetic relish, and comprehends two ideas – that it denotes the relishable quality inherent in an artistic work and that it refers to the relishable experience occasioned by the work in the reader or the spectator. Every work - poem or play – is supposed to treat an emotive theme and communicate a distinct emotional flavor and mood. But, Bharata does not refer to Rasa as a semblance of a mental condition or an experience of an illusion of reality, for to describe it as a copy is to presuppose the existence of the object imitated, and that which appears as a copy of the mood cannot be traced.

== Significance ==
In Rasasvada the sthayibhava (basic mental states) persists in the self, spiritual ecstasy is on the other hand free from any mental experience whatsoever; the mystical ecstasy is dominated by pure consciousness (Citta).
