= Anubandha chatushtaya =

Anubandha chatushtaya (Sanskrit: अनुबन्ध चतुष्टय) literally means four connections, and therefore, it is four-fold in nature and content viz, – a) adhikāri ('the qualified student') who has developed ekāgrata ('single pointed mind'), chitta shuddhi ('purity of the mind') and vikshepa ('freedom from restlessness and impurity') or adhikāra (aptitude); b) vishaya ('subject matter' or 'the theme') pertaining to the Jiva-Brahman identity; c) prayojana or phalasruti ('result' or 'fruit') which is atyantika-dukha-nivritti ('complete cessation of sorrow') and paramānanda-prāpti ('attainment of supreme happiness'), and d) sambandha ('relationship' or 'intertextuality') between adhikāra, vishaya and prayojana.

== Methodology ==
Sadananda reminds that:-

तत्र अनुबन्धो नाम अधिकारिविषयसंबन्धप्रयोजनानि |

"The preliminary questions of the Vedanta are the determination of the competency of the student, the subject-matter, its connection with the book and the necessity of for its study." – Vedantasara (sutra I.5)

a)- Adhikāra is the capacity to study (adhyana) the subject-matter in which respect there exist doubts (sandigdhata) which is the basis of the intended inquiry into that particular subject-matter for the eventual removal of all doubts and gain of its proper understanding. Madhavacharya speaks about three levels of adhikāra – adhama ('lower'), madhyama ('middle') and uttama ('higher'), the last two levels indicate that the student is of peaceful mind (śanta), is understanding and has non-repressed sense-control (danta), has withdrawn from worldly objects (uparata), indifferent (titikśu) and composed and tranquil (samhita), and knows that he is adequately prepared to meet the truth face to face. The Mimāṃsakas consider adhikāra to be a notion of appropriateness. All things and actions have identifiable adhikāra. Adhikāra indicates the level of preparation necessary for making one skilled for higher gains. The concept of adhikāra also helps describe the relationship between purusha and prakrti and explain the reason for activation of creative power of nature, thus bringing about the experience of the world (darśana bhoga) and liberation from this experience (kaivalya). The eagerness to know incites the obligation (adhikāra) to bring about realization of knowledge. In this direction the student must firstly develop Ekāgratā ('one-pointed'). Ekagrata is the state of determined and continuous concentration obtained by integrating the psycho-mental flux (sarvārthatā i.e. variously directed, discontinuous, diffused attention) which is – योगश्चित्तवृत्तिनिरोधः (Yoga Sutra)- meaning – Yoga is suppression of psycho-mental states i.e. disappearance of all possible misconceptions. In this yogic state of ekagrata the yogi gains genuine will. Upasana brings about ekagrata, and upasana in its own turn is brought about by chitta shuddhi ('the purity of heart'); and controls vikshepa (all forms of mental wanderings or distractions).

In Sanskrit grammar, an adhikara is a 'heading rule' made belonging to it, by the accent of swarita with the object of avoiding a repeated designation.

b)- Vishaya is the object of knowledge, here the subject-matter; the universal Self (Brahman) seemingly different from the individual self (Jiva). Knowledge reveals the real to be superimposed by the unreal on account of ignorance. As explained by Sadananda the subject is the one-ness of the individual soul and the universal soul (the Absolute) as explained by the Upanishads; this is the essence of the Vedanta. Consciousness, which is infinite and indivisible, is able to come into contact with objects and is inherent in objects which are thus very many varying phases of consciousness; such objects that are by themselves phases of consciousness are vishaya-caitanya, outside consciousness no object can exist.

c)- Prayojana means - the 'purpose', 'end result' or 'resolution of the inquiry'; it is the established result arrived at after practice of devotion conducted with a peaceful mind and body (śānta bhāva). Uddyotakara explains that the basic urges for attainment of happiness and avoidance of sorrow, such as the chaturvarga composed of dharma, artha, kama and moksha, prompt human activity, and such motivations lead to the end results or prayojana. Vedānta Paribhāśa, recognizing this chaturvarga describes prayojana as that which when known is desired as one's own, Prayojana is the realizable purpose, the desired reason or motive which prompts actions but which cannot be indicated separately from sambandha, both being inter-related,

d)- Sambandha does not necessarily identify either vishaya or prayojana though it can be factual and reasonable (siddha) or contrary to fact and reason (asiddha). Shankara tells us that the self is bodyless (aśarira) but its relationship (sambandha) with the body is asiddha because the self is unrelated to any activity of the body and unconnected with merit and demerit arising from activity notwithstanding the fact that the jiva erroneously identifies itself with the body. Vedantasara's afore-cited statement as an exposition of these four anubandhas ('connections') and in particular the connection called sambandha to mean – (quote) "the relation of what has to be made known in the Vedantic system, the identity between Brahman and the individual soul" (unquote).

== Implication ==
In Hindu philosophy, Anubandha chatushtaya is a traditional Indian rhetorical mode connected with the gain of knowledge and supreme perfection, which mode is based on four fundamental aspects of thoughts and actions working in-tandem which are – a) the proposed subject or theme, b) the intended goal and its nature, c) why for that goal is sought in the light of d) the subject opted and the anticipated apprehension of truth. Krishna assures Arjuna:-

परं भूयः प्रवक्ष्यामि ज्ञानानां ज्ञानमुत्तमम् |
यज्ज्ञात्वा मुनयः सर्वे परां सिद्धिमितो गताः ||

"I shall again speak of that highest knowledge which is superior to any other knowledge, knowing which all the sages have attained the supreme perfection." Bhagavad Gita (XIV.1)

and thereafter, proceeds to explain how that knowledge can be gained and developed which would eventually free a mumukshu ('seeker') who due to association with the modes of nature (prakrti) is entangled in this material world, and therefore, explains the nature of the three gunas. This particular statement is in the form of an Anubandha chatushtaya the subject-matter of which is Brahma Vidya, the goal is liberation from sorrow, and pryojanam is the knowledge of Brahman which gives spontaneous release. Krishna leads Arjuna to that knowledge of the self which reveals what the subject is, what the "I" is – Tat Tvam Asi , this is the relationship that helps the seeker, possessing basic qualities, to decide whether he should connect or associate with the subject-matter or not.

== Read this Book in Simple Tamil Language ==
Anubandha chatushtaya Tamil Book
