= Ganesha in world religions =

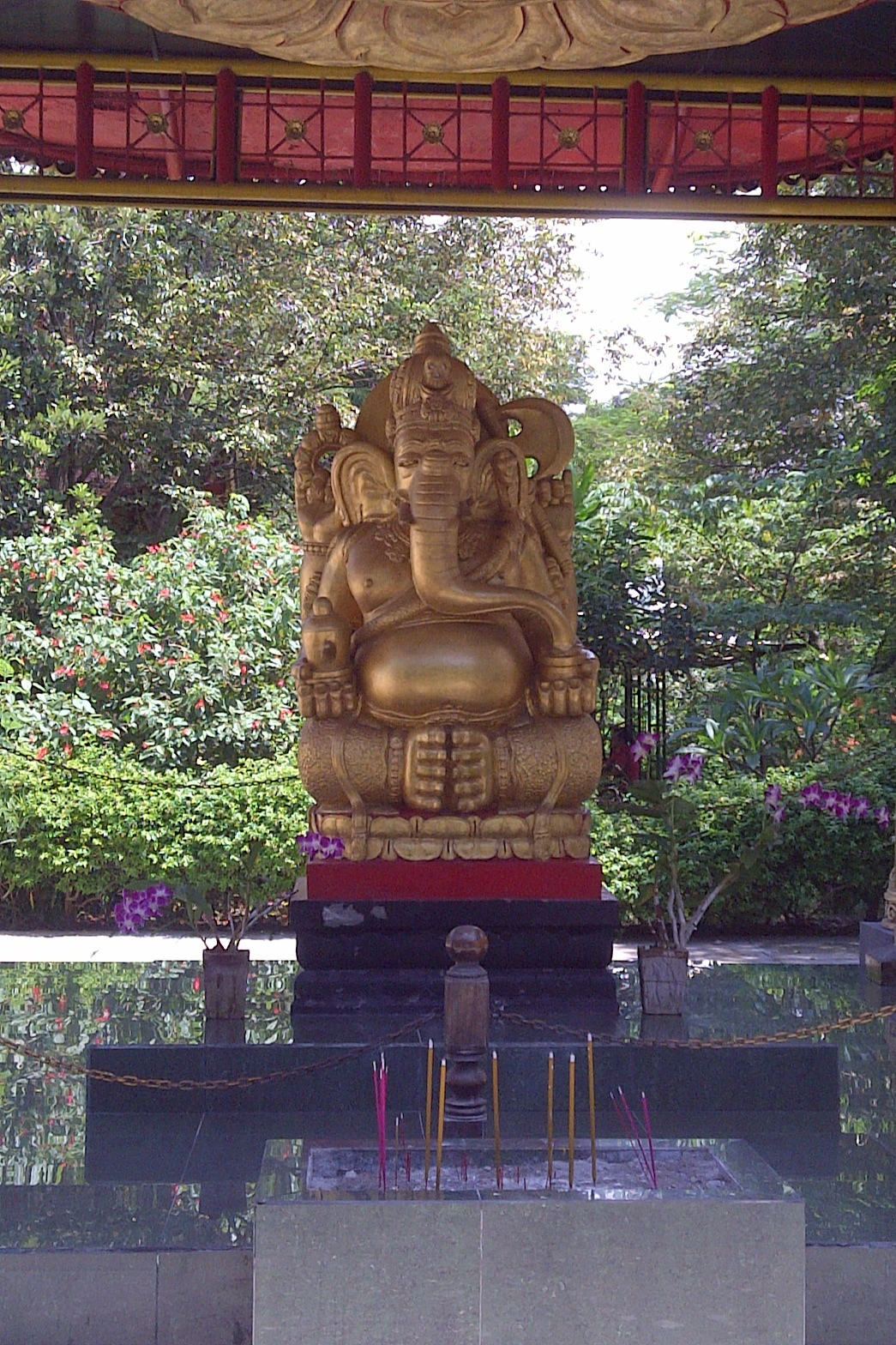
Ganesha statue at Sanggar Agung Temple, Surabaya-Indonesia, worshipped by the Chinese, Hindus, Buddhist and even the Kejawen

Ganesha is a prominent Hindu god. He is the god of Beginnings, Wisdom and Luck and worshipped as the Remover of Obstacles. Ganesha is easily recognized from his elephant head. Devotion to Ganesha is widely diffused and extends to Jains and Buddhists and beyond India.

India and Hinduism have influenced many countries in other parts South Asia, East Asia and Southeast Asia as a result of commercial and cultural contacts. Ganesha is one of many Hindu deities who reached foreign lands as a result.

Ganesha was particularly worshipped by traders and merchants, who went out of India for commercial ventures. The period from approximately the 10th century CE onwards was marked by the development of new networks of exchange, the formation of trade guilds, and a resurgence of money circulation, and it was during this time that Ganesha became the principal deity associated with traders. The earliest inscription where Ganesha is invoked before any other deity is by the merchant community.

== Jainism ==
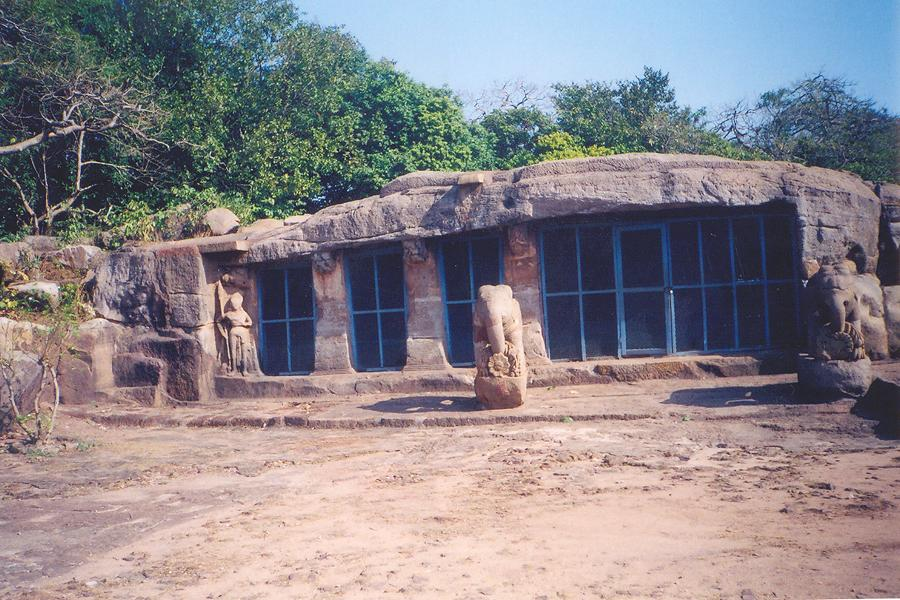
Ganeshagumpha (cave no-10) Udayagiri

Ganesha is worshipped by only some Jainas, for whom he appears to have taken over certain functions of Kubera. Jaina connections with the trading community support the idea that Jainism took up the worship of Ganesha as a result of commercial connections.

The Jaina canonical literature does not mention Ganesha. The earliest literary reference to Ganesha in Jainism is in Abhidhāna chintāmani of Hemachandra (c.a. third quarter of the 12th century CE). It refers to several appellations of Ganesha such as Heramba, Ganavigneṣa and Vinayaka and visualizes him as elephant headed, pot-bellied, bearing an axe and riding a mouse.

The popularity is, however, not met with in Digambara texts. Except two medieval figures carved at Svetambara sites of Udayagiri and Khandagiri caves, Orissa and an early figure at Mathura, his representations are not found in any Digambara sites.

== Buddhism ==
Ganesha also appears in Buddhism, not only in the form of the Buddhist god Vināyaka, but also portrayed as a Hindu deity form also called Vināyaka. His image may be found on Buddhist sculptures of the late Gupta period. As the Buddhist god Vināyaka, he is often shown dancing, a form called Nṛtta Ganapati that was popular in North India and adopted in Nepal and then into Tibet. A dancing Ganesha is evident in the Malay archipelago in the temple of Candi Sukuh.

=== Tibetan Buddhism ===
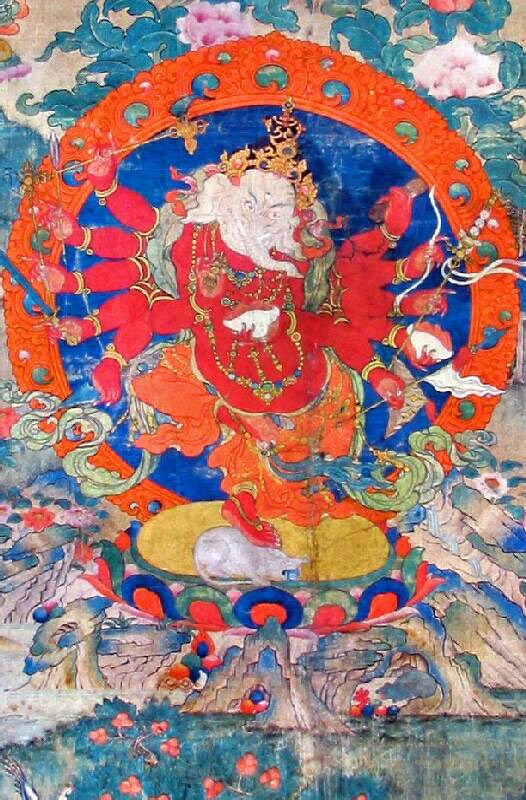
Ganapati, Maha Rakta

Tibetan representations of Ganesha show ambivalent views of him. In one Tibetan form he is shown being trodden under foot by Mahākala, a popular Tibetan deity. Other depictions show him as a Buddhist deity, the Destroyer of Obstacles, sometimes shown dancing.

Ganapati, Maha Rakta (Tibetan: ཚོགས་བདག tsog gi dag po, mar chen. English: The Great Red Lord of Hosts or Ganas) is a Tantric Buddhist form of Ganapati (Ganesha) related to the Chakrasamvara Cycle of Tantras. This form of Ganapati is regarded as an emanation of Avalokiteshvara.

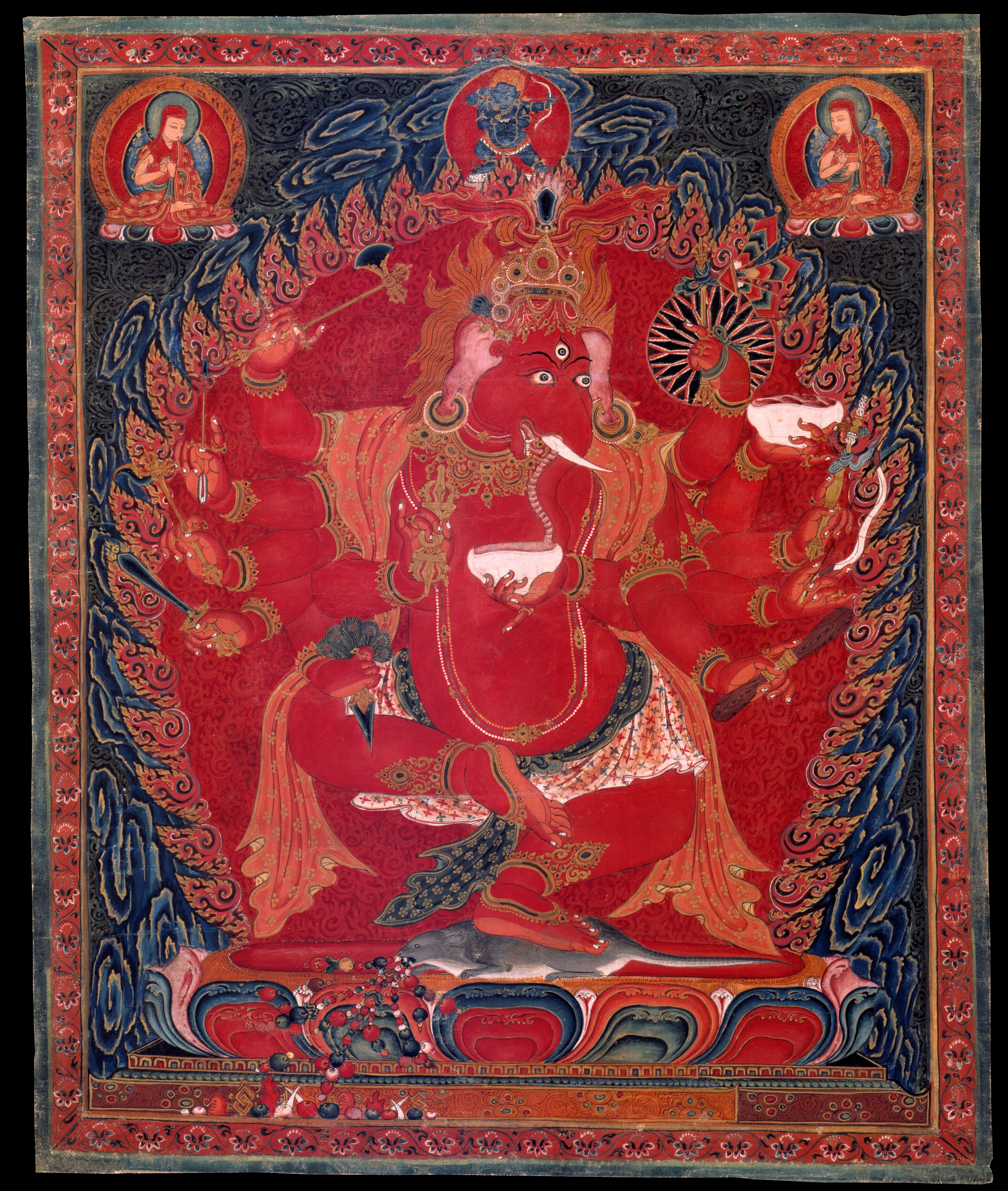
Dancing Red Ganapati of the Three Red Deities, Rubin Museum of Art

In depictions of the six-armed protector Mahakala (Skt: Shad-bhuja Mahakala, Wylie: mGon po phyag drug pa), an elephant-headed figure usually addressed as Vinayaka is seen being trampled by the Dharma Protector, but he does not appear distressed. In Vajrayana and cognate Buddhist art, He is depicted as a subdued god trampled by deities like Aparajita (A form of Durga), or Parnasabari (Medicine God in Hinduism).

The Tibetan Ganesha appears, besides bronzes, in the resplendent Thangka paintings alongside the Buddha. In the Tibetan Ka'gyur tradition, it is said that the Buddha had taught the "Ganapati Hridaya Mantra" (or "Aryaganapatimantra") to disciple Ananda.

=== Japanese Buddhism ===
Vinayaka's inclusion in the two primary mandalas of East Asian esoteric Buddhism (Tangmi) - brought to Japan from Tang China by Kūkai (774–835), the founder of Shingon Buddhism - facilitated his introduction to Japan, where he (like most other Hindu deities assimilated into Buddhism) was first considered a minor deity. By the Heian period (794–1185 CE), an individualized cult centered around Vinayaka (as Shōten / Kangiten) emerged. He was then increasingly identified and conflated with a number of Buddhist and native Japanese deities, eventually being regarded in some texts in a henotheistic way as a kind of transcendent god who is the source of all the other gods. Although this development shares a number of parallels with the Buddhist tradition of Ganapatya, it does not seem that Shōten benefited from a group whose members defined themselves exclusively as his worshippers as Ganapatya did.

Although some traits are common to both Vinayaka (Shōten) and Ganesha, there are also some notable differences between the two. For instance, the Buddhist Vinayaka was originally negatively portrayed as the creator of obstacles and the leader of a horde (gaṇa) of obstructive demons called vinayakas; indeed, some legends portray him as originally being a malevolent demon king who was subjugated by the bodhisattva Avalokiteśvara (Kannon in Japanese), who took the form of a vinayaka demoness to tame and reform him. As Shōten grew in stature, however, he was increasingly disassociated from his vinayaka underlings, ultimately becoming regarded as a manifestation of the cosmic buddha Vairocana. home.

=== Buddha as avatar of Ganesha in Hinduism ===
Buddha appears as a name of Ganesha in the second verse of the Ganesha Purana version of the Ganesha Sahasranama. The positioning of this name at the beginning of the Ganesha Sahasranama indicates that the name was of importance to the authors of that scripture, who were Ganapatya Hindus.

Bhaskararaya's commentary on the Ganesha Sahasranama says that this name for Ganesha means that the Buddha was an incarnation (Avatar) of Ganesha. This interpretation is not widely known even among Ganapatya, and the Buddha is not mentioned in the lists of Ganesha's incarnations given in the main sections of the Ganesha Purana and Mudgala Purana. Bhaskararaya also provides a more general interpretation of this name as simply meaning that Ganesha's very form is "eternal enlightenment" (nityabuddaḥ), so he is named Buddha.

== Indian subcontinent ==
=== Nepal ===
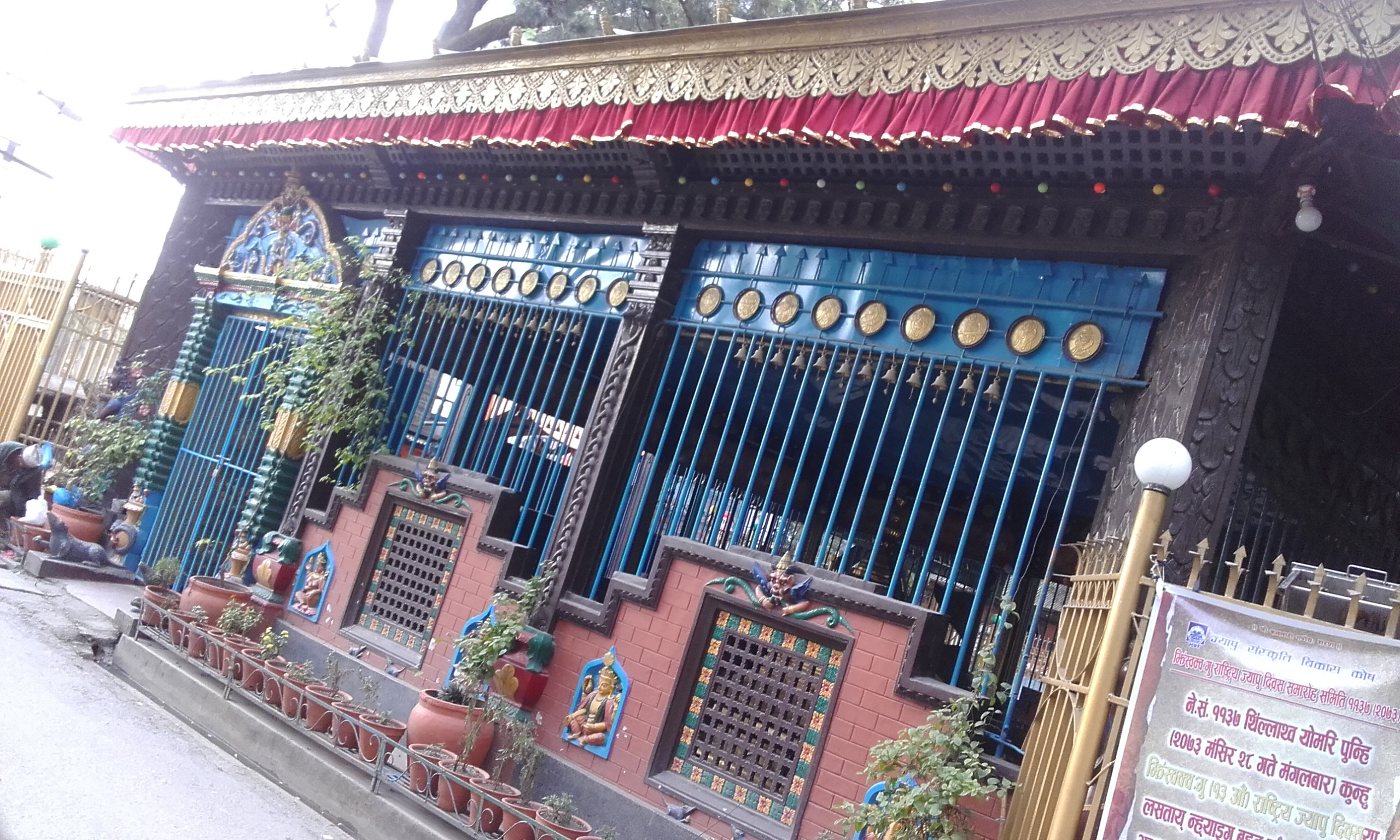
Kamaladi Ganesh Temple in Kathmandu.

Nepal also celebrates the Ganesh Chaturthi where it is known as the Vinayak Chaturthi as Genesha is considered a symbol of auspiciousness and benefits along with Vighnaharta (destroyer of hurdles). Nepal has numerous Ganesha temples. In Kamaladi Ganesh Temple of Kathmandu Valley the Ganesha is also known as White Ganesha.

=== Sri Lanka ===
In Sri Lanka, where Ganesha is called Pillayar and worshipped in Tamil-dominated areas, there are 14 ancient temples of Lord Ganesha. Idols of Ganesha are also installed in many Buddhist temples built on the banks of Kelanya Ganga river near Colombo.

== East Asia ==
=== China ===
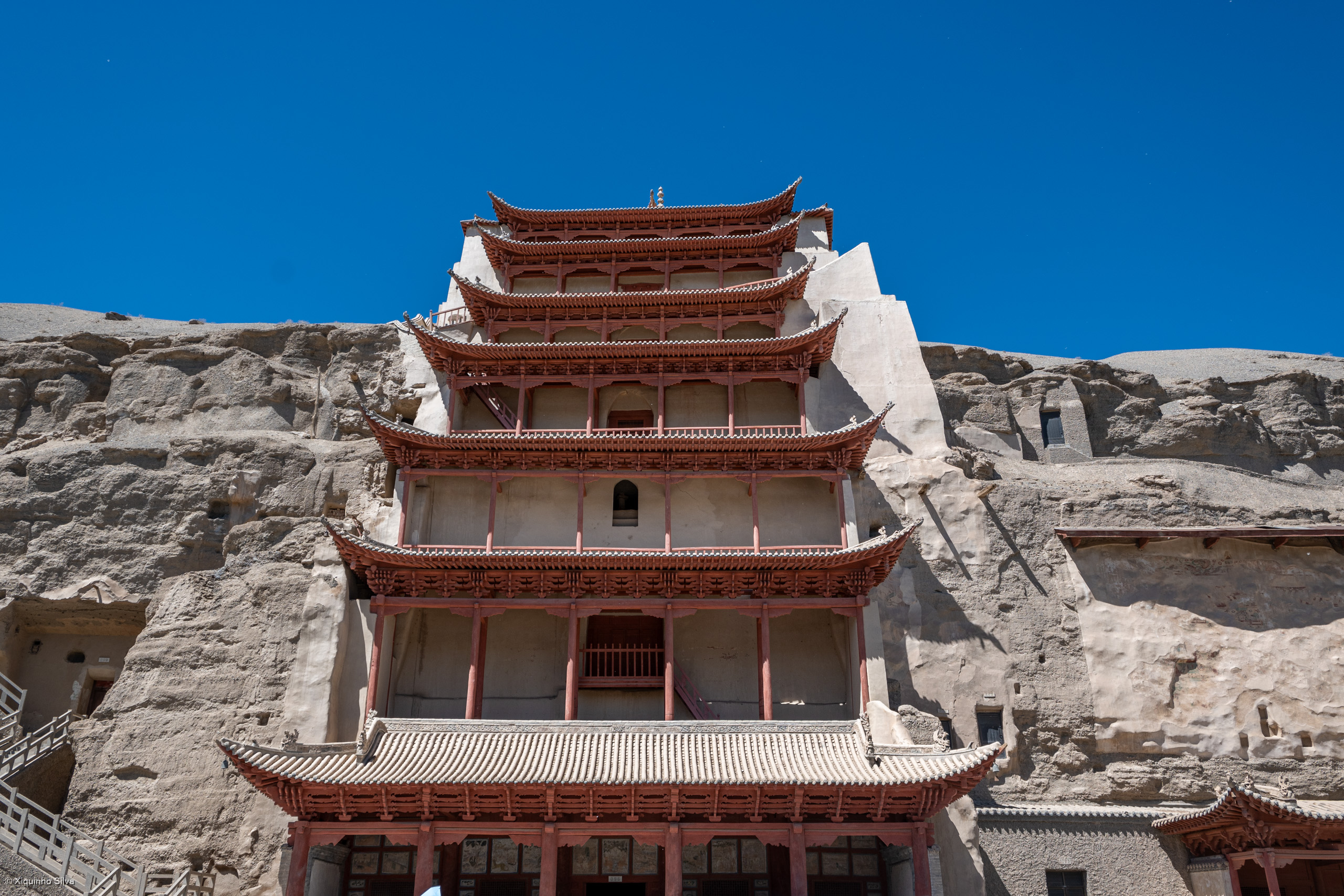
Mogao Caves of Kingdom of Khotan (Gosthan), r. first century BCE to 1006.

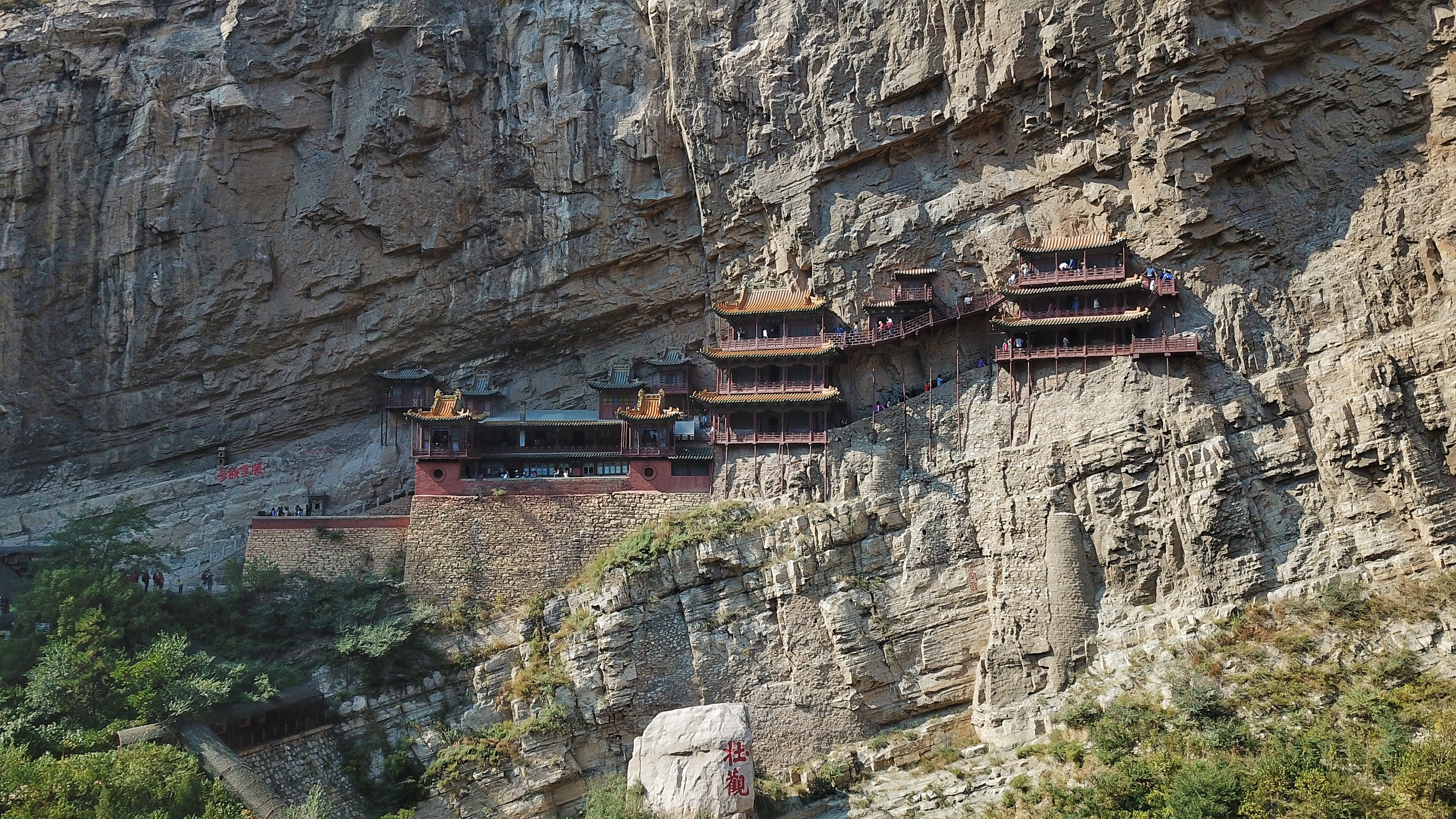
Hanging Temple of Northern Wei dynasty, r. 386 to 535.

In northern China, where Ganesha is called Kangiten or Kanjiten, the earliest known stone statue of Ganesha carries an inscription dated to 531 CE. The rock-cut temples, such as Mogao Caves (Caves of the Thousand Buddhas) with 500 temples in Dunhuang on the Silk Road in Gansu province, and Hanging Temple in Mount Heng in Datong city of Shanxi Province have the cut-cut images of Ganesha where other Vedic deities, such as the Surya (sun), the Chandra (moon), Kamadeva (cupid), and the Navagraha (nine planetary divinities).

=== Japan ===
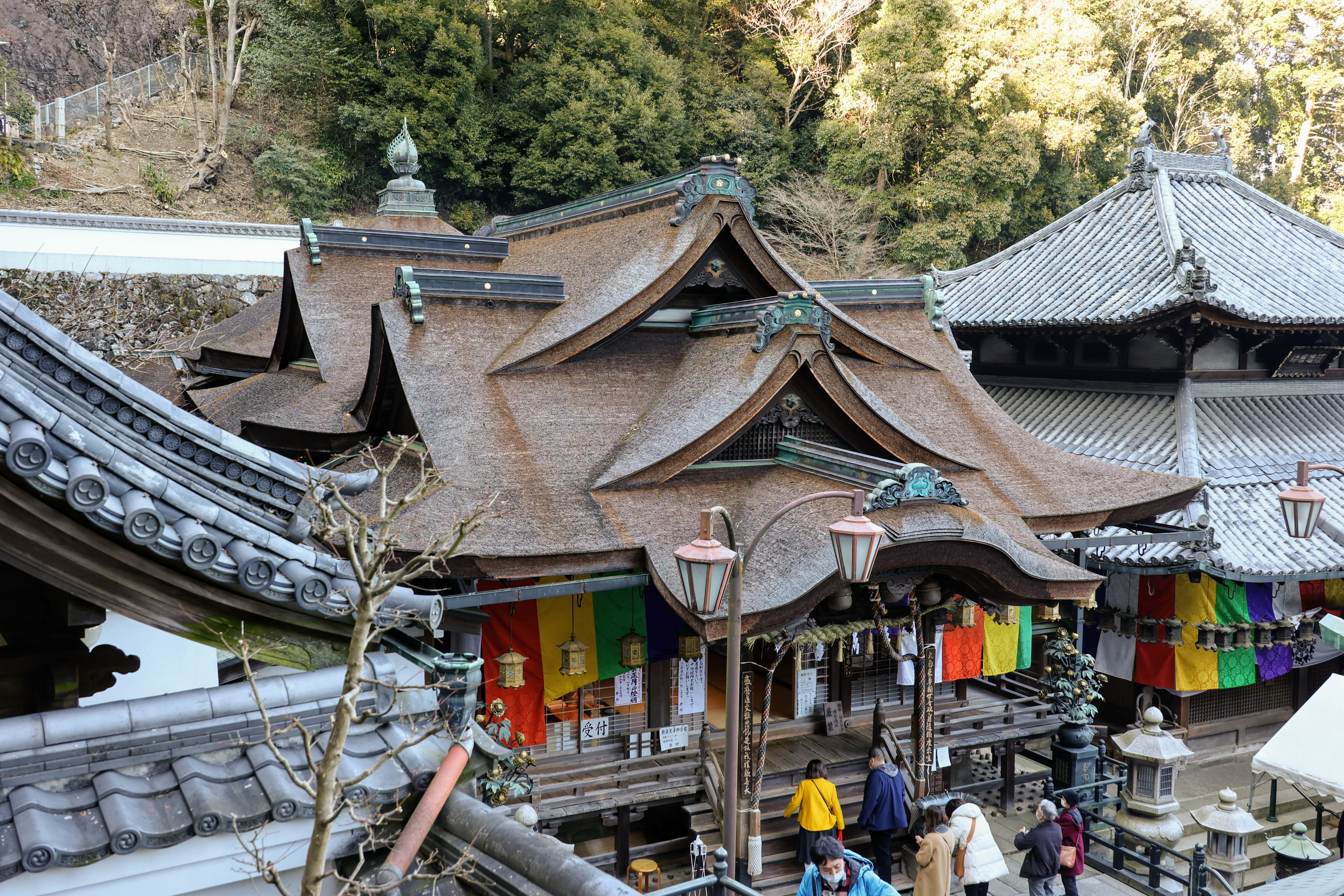
Hozan-ji temple of Ganesha.

In Japan, where Ganesha is worshipped as the Kangiten or Shoten for luck and success, the first recorded mention of worship of Ganesh dates back to 806 CE. Japan has over 200 temples of Ganesha. Hōzan-ji Temple on Mount Ikoma outside Osaka city is Japan's largest Ganesha temple where Genesha is called Ikoma-Shōten (生駒聖天) and depicted as dual male-female in standing embrace.

== Southeast Asia ==
Hindus spread through Maritime Southeast Asia and took their culture with them, including Ganesha, statues of whom are found throughout the region, often beside Shiva sanctuaries. The forms of Ganesha found in Hindu art of Java, Bali, and Borneo show specific regional influences. The gradual emigration of Hindus to Indochina established Ganesha in modified forms in Burma, Cambodia, and Thailand. In Indochina Hinduism and Buddhism were practiced side by side, and mutual influences can be seen in Ganesha iconography of that region.

=== Cambodia ===
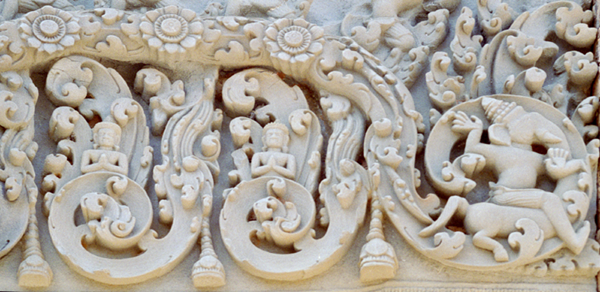
Ganesha in Ta Prohm, Angkor

In Cambodia, Ganesha is also featured in reliefs in the Cambodian temples.

=== Indonesia ===
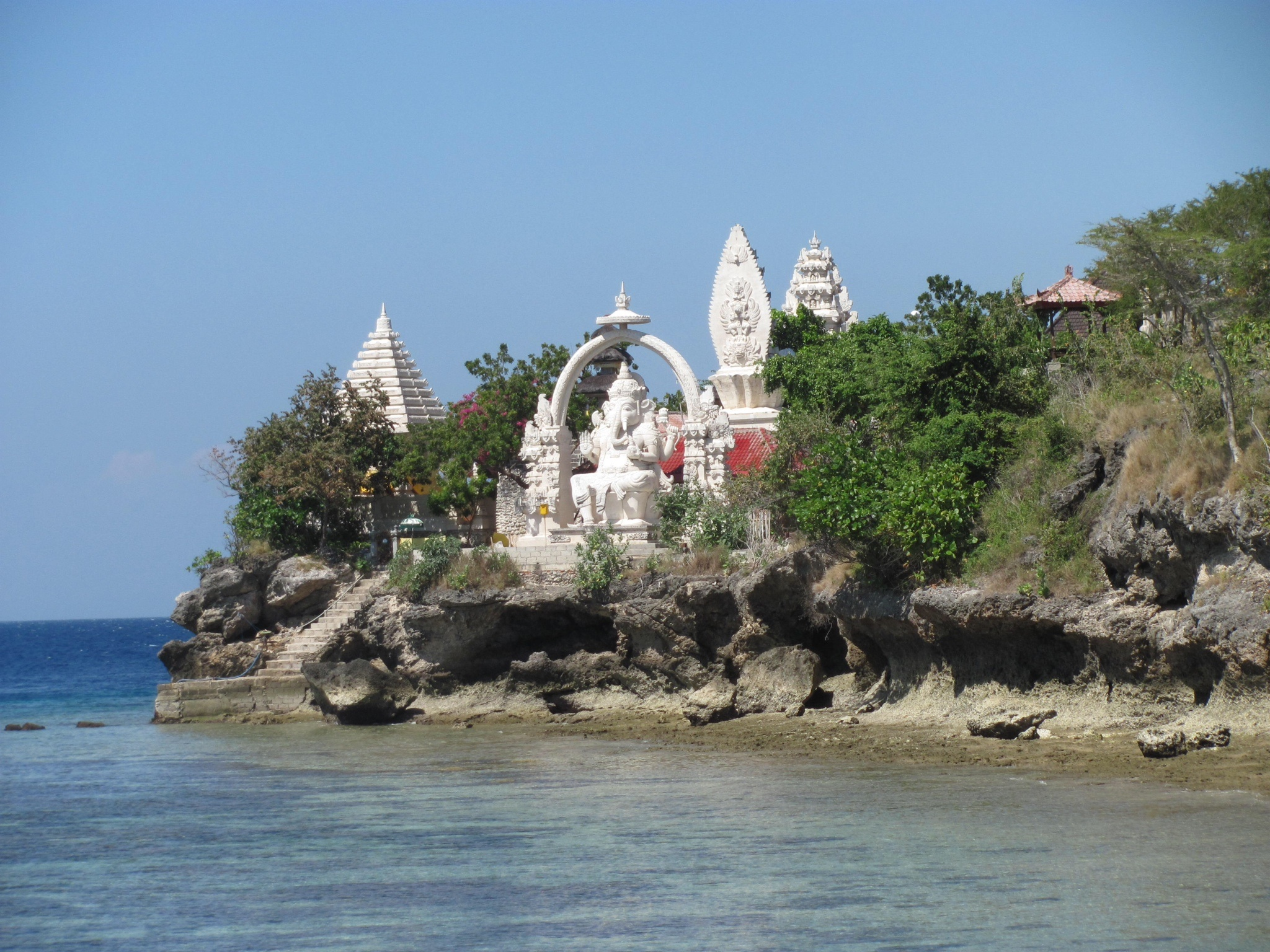
Manjangan (Ganesha) temple in Bali, Indonesia.

==== History ====
In Indonesia, where European scholars call Ganesha the Indonesian God of Wisdom, a Ganesha statue from the 1st century CE was found on the summit of Mount Raksa in Panaitan island in the Ujung Kulon National Park or West Java. A 700-year-old Ganesha statue is still present near Mount Bromo in East Java. The 9th-century-CE statue of Ganesha resides in western cella (room) of Prambanan Hindu temple. An 11th-century-CE Ganesha statue (seen in the picture below) was found in eastern Java, Kediri is placed in The Museum of Indian Art (Museum für Indische Kunst), Berlin-Dahlem.

==== Worship ====
People in Indonesia worship Lord Ganesha as the pioneer of knowledge, wisdom and art. Lord Ganesha was worshipped as a Tantric deity on the island of Java in Indonesia in a tradition developed in the 14th and 15th centuries as a mixture of Buddhism and Shaivism. While there are no temples dedicated specifically to Gaṇeśa, he is found in every Śiva shrine throughout the islands.

In Bali, instead of idol immersion, emphasis is given on symbolic worship. People go to temples, offer special prasad and pray.

In Bandung, there is a Ganesha Street.

Earlier there was a picture of Ganeshji on the 20 thousand rupee note here.

=== Myanmar ===
Derived from Mahāvināyaka, Ganesha is known as Mahāpeinne (မဟာပိန္နဲ) in Burmese. The worship of Mahāpeinne Nat started around the early Second Ava Period. Konbaung king Mindon Min recognized the Mahapeinne Nat (Ganesh) alongside Thurathati (Sarasvati), Sandi (Dewi), Paramithwa (Siva), and Beithano (Visnu) as Natkyi (နတ်ကြီး) or greater Nat.

=== Thailand ===
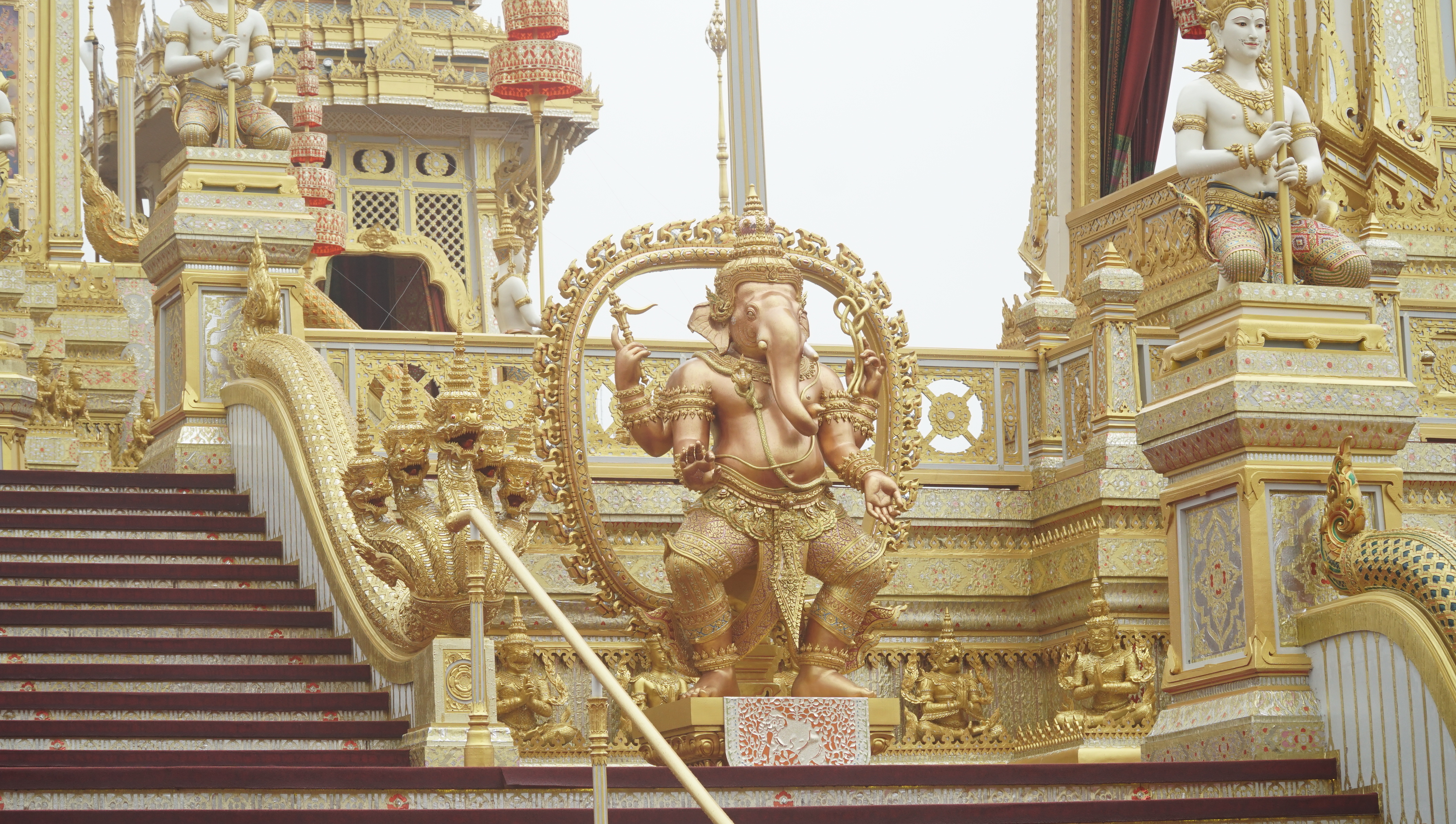
Ganesha at of the merumat of King Bhumibol Adulyadej.

In Thailand, Ganesha, called Phra Phikanet (พระพิฆเนศ) or Phra Phikanesuan (พระพิฆเนศวร) and worshipped as the deity of fortune and success, has a history dating back at least 1000 years. A 10th century bronze statue of Ganesha was excavated in Southwestern Thailand in Phang Nga. The world's tallest standing Ganesha statue, 39 metres high, is in Chachoengsao.

==== Worship ====
In Thailand, Ganesha worshipped as the deity of fortune and success, and the remover of obstacles, is associated with arts, education and trade. Ganesha appears in the emblem of the Department of Fine Arts in Thailand. Large television channels and production companies have shrines in his honour in front of their premises. Few movies or television shows begin shooting with a Hindu ritual in which prayers and offerings are made to Ganesha. Thai Buddhists frequently pay respect to Ganesha and other Hindu deities as a result of the overlapping Buddhist/Hindu cosmology. He is honoured with Motaka, sweets and fruit, when business is good, and he is made ridiculous by putting his picture or statue upside down, when business is down. As lord of business and diplomacy, he sits on a high pedestal outside Bangkok's CentralWorld (formerly World Trade Center), where people offer flowers, incense and a reverential sawasdee.

==== Thai mythology ====
The Thai mythology of Ganesha is quite different from that of India, the traditional Thai Ganesha did not have a potbelly like the Indian one. In addition, the fact that he has the head of an elephant is different from Hindu mythology. In Thai version, there was an Apsara who committed a crime and was reborn as a water elephant named Asurapangki (อสุรภังคี) who was very powerful, causing trouble throughout all three worlds. Shiva assigned his son, Kanthakuman (ขันธกุมาร; Murugan) to crack down. But first, a ceremony must be done to topknot-cutting. The ceremony was held at Mount Kailash, Phra Phrom (Brahma in Thai version) is invited and Vishnu came to join as well. But only Phra Phrom came, as for Vishnu, he was sleeping, Shiva then had Indra blow a conch trumpet to wake him up. Vishnu then opened his eyes, sleepy and irritated, and said "The headless son of a bitch, you can disturb my sleep". With such sacred words immediately, all six heads of Kanthakuman disappeared. Shiva therefore ordered Vishvakarma to go find the human head being in the human world. Vishvakarma could not be found, but he came across an elephant lying dead with its head turned towards the west, the direction of the death. Therefore, the head of that elephant was cut off and connected to the body of Kanthakuman. Since then, the three supreme dities finally decided to change the name of Kanthakuman to Ganesh.

==== Temples ====
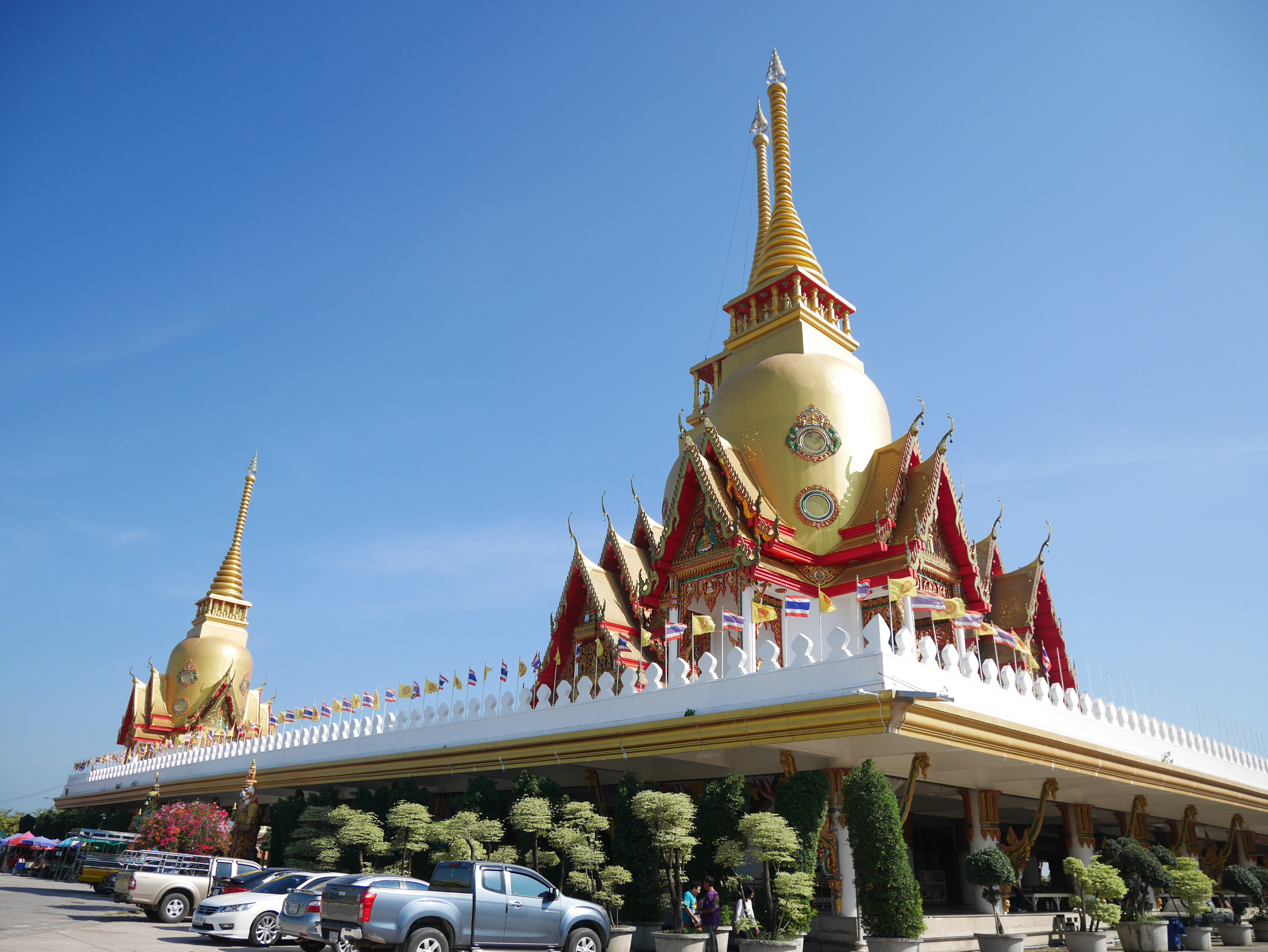
Wat Prong Akat in Chachoengsao has world's tallest Ganesha statue.

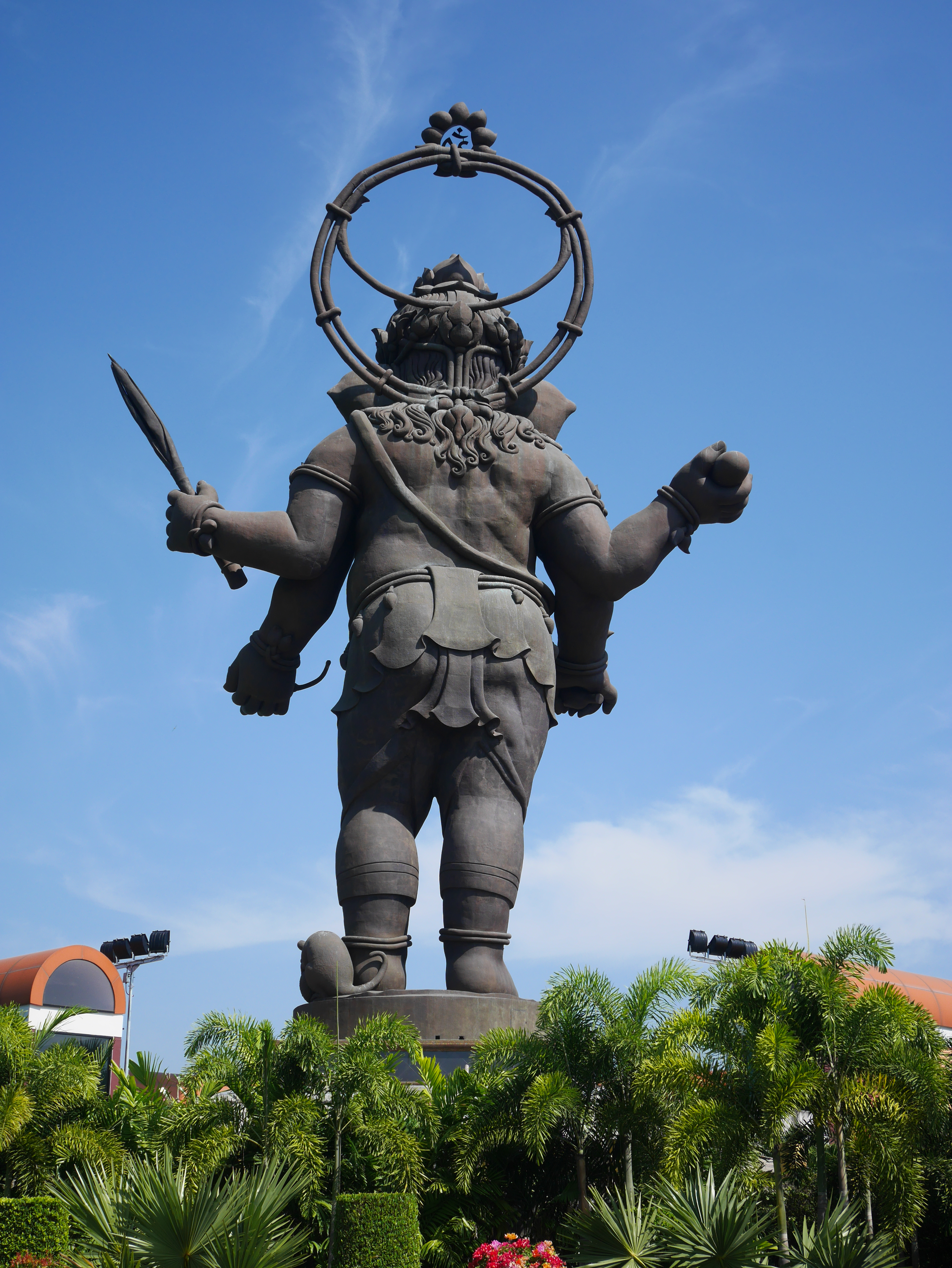
bronze statue of Ganesha in the Khlong Khuean Ganesh International Park in Chachoengsao.

- Bangkok
  - Royal Brahmin Temple in central Bangkok: located by the Giant Swing, where some of the oldest images of Ganesha can be found. Other old Ganesha images can be seen throughout Thailand, including a 10th-century-CE bronze image found at Phang-Na with both Tamil and Thai inscriptions.
  - Huai Khwang Intersection Ganesha temple: Another highly revered Ganesha shrine in Bangkok, is the Ganesha Shrine at the corner of Huai Khwang Intersection, the four-corners of Ratchadaphisek and Pracha Songkhro with Pracha Rat Bamphen Roads on the border between Din Daeng and Huai Khwang Districts. This shrine was built in 2000 on the site of a former marble factory. It is popularly worshipped by both Thais and Chinese.
  - Wat Phra Sri Umadevi in Silom also houses a Ganesha image which was transported from India in the late 19th century.
- Chachoengsao, known as the "city of Ganesha in Thailand": Chachoengsao has 3 huge Hindu-Buddhist deity Ganesha (Phra Phikanet or พระพิฆเนศ) statues in 3 different temples around Chachoengsao.
  - "Phrong Akat Temple" has 49 meters tall sitting Ganesha, which is the tallest sitting Ganesha in Thailand,
  - "Khlong Khuean Ganesh International Park" has 39 meters high standing Ganesha statute, which is the tallest standing Ganesha in Thailand,
  - "Saman Wattanaram Temple" has 16 meters high and 22 meters long reclining Ganesha.

== Elsewhere ==
=== Mauritius ===
In Mauritius, where the Indian Diaspora is the largest ethnic group, the Ganesh Chaturthi is celebrated as a community festival with great pomp for 10 days.

== Speculation related to Janus ==
In 1785, William Jones drew a close comparison between a particular form of Ganesha, known as Dwimukhi-Ganesha, and Janus, the two-headed Roman god. Jones felt the resemblance between Dwimukhi-Ganesha and Janus was so strong that he referred to Ganesha as the "Janus of India." The Dwimukhi-Ganesha form is a very unusual depiction in which Ganesha is shown with the head of an elephant looking toward his right and a human head at his left. It was possessed of four arms. Nagar says that the Dwimukhi-Ganesha form was associated with the region around Bombay.

This speculation was repeated by Volney in his Meditation on the Revolutions of Empires (1791), in which he noted the phonetic similarity between the names "Ganesha" and "Janus" and both gods' association with beginnings; and by Moor in The Hindu Pantheon (1810). Moor expanded the claims of an association based on functional grounds, noting that Janus, like Ganesha, was invoked at the beginning of undertakings, a liminal god who was the guardian of gates. Moor made various other speculations on the connection between Janus and Ganesha. These fanciful connections proposed by early Indologists no longer appear in modern academic reviews of Ganesha's history.

Ganesha is represented as having anywhere from one to five heads, so depictions with two heads are not reliable evidence of a connection with Janus. Representations of Ganesha with two heads are uncommon, and according to Nagar, textual references to the adoration of Ganesha with two heads are difficult to trace. There are no other examples of two-headed forms in which one head is human other than the Dwimukhi-Ganesha form. In the thirty-two mediation forms of Ganesha that are described in the Sritattvanidhi only one has two heads (Dwimukhi Ganapati, the Ganapati with two faces), and both of those are heads of elephants, like all the other forms described.

== Sources ==
- Brown, Robert L. Ganesh: Studies of an Asian God (State University of New York: Albany 1991). ISBN 0-7914-0657-1. A collection of studies.
  - Chapter 8: Brown, Robert L.. "Gaņeśa in Southeast Asian Art: Indian Connections and Indigenous Developments".
  - Chapter 10: Lancaster, Lewis. "Gaņeśa in China: Methods for Transforming the Demoniac".
  - Chapter 11: Sanford, James H. "Literary Aspects of Japan's Dual-Gaņeśa Cult".
- Getty, Alice. Gaņeśa: A Monograph on the Elephant-Faced God. (Clarendon Press: Oxford, 1936). 1992 reprint edition, ISBN 81-215-0377-X. Individual chapters are devoted to individual countries and regions of the world.
- Krishan, Yuvraj. Gaņeśa: Unravelling An Enigma. (Motilal Banarsidass Publishers: Delhi, 1999) ISBN 81-208-1413-4. Chapter XVI. "Gaņeśa Beyond India's Frontiers".
- Martin-Dubost, Paul. Gaņeśa: The Enchanter of the Three Worlds. (Project for Indian Cultural Studies: Mumbai, 1997). ISBN 81-900184-3-4. Appendix III: The Expansion.
- Nagar, Shanti Lal. The Cult of Vinayaka. (Intellectual Publishing House: New Delhi, 1992). ISBN 81-7076-043-9. Chapter 17: "The Travels Abroad".
- Pal, Pratapaditya. Ganesh: The Benevolent. (Marg Publications: 1995) ISBN 81-85026-31-9. A collection of studies, well-illustrated, with broad geographic range.
- Michael Wright Ganesha: The Great Hihdu God in India and Southeast Asia (Matichon 2006) ISBN 978-974-323-548-1.
