= Kasaya =

Kasaya may refer to:

- Kasaya (attachment), in Indian philosophy
- Kashaya (Jainism), a word and concept in Jainism that translates to "passion" or "negative emotions"
- Kasaya (clothing), a term for the traditional robes of Buddhist monks
- Kasaya (surname)
- Kushinagar, site of the death of Gautama Buddha in India, also known as Kasaya

== See also ==
- Kashayam, a term in Ayurveda (Indian medicine)
- Kasayapahuda, a Jain text
