= Kasaya (attachment) =

Hindu philosophical concept

- Samkhya: Kapila
- Yoga: Patanjali
- Vaisheshika: Kaṇāda, Prashastapada
- Secular: Valluvar

Kasaya is attachment to worldly objects and is an obstacle in the path leading to Nirvikalpa Samadhi: it is overcome through viveka, discrimination.

== Meaning ==
Kasaya or Kashāya (Sanskrit: कषाय) means, 'astringent', 'decay', 'smearing', 'juice', 'degeneracy', 'anointing', 'gum', 'resin', 'red-brown', 'stupidity', 'defect', 'fragrant'. It also means 'attachment to worldly objects' or to 'the yellowish-red garments worn by monks'.

== Overview ==
Sadananda defines Kasaya as attachment to worldly objects, the failure of the mental state to rest on the Absolute, owing to the numbness brought on by impressions due to attachment even when there is no torpidity or distraction (Vedantasara) (Sl.212). In Vedanta, the word Kasaya denotes metaphorically a rigid state of mind hardened by one's own inclinations and passions.

== Jiva ==
Rishi Gautama Nodha (Rig Veda I.58.3) describes the Jiva in the following words:-

क्राणा रुद्रेभिर्वसुभिः पुरोहितो होता निषत्तो रयिषाळमर्त्यः|
रथो न विक्ष्वृञ्जसान आयुषु वयानुषग्वार्या देव ऋण्वति ||

"That is the Jiva (क्राणा – the spotless achiever of good deeds) who should be known as the one who moves about (निसत्तः) in the bodily form (होता) applying and enjoying all substances and thoughts (the gross and the fine) all the while attached to this earth or world (वसुभिः) guided and impelled by the Pranas (रुद्रेभिः) experiencing the varying stages of birth, growth, maturity etc., (आयुषु) and all attendant consequences (ॠञ्ज्सानः) with a view to enjoying the desired happiness and comfort though in reality by itself it is pure and undying. "

And, Rishi Kumaro Yamayana (Rig Veda X.135.6) in the following mantra explains

यथाभवदनुदेयी ततो अग्रमजायत |
पुरस्ताद् बुध्न आततः पश्चान्निरयणं कृतम् ||

that the Paramatman "universal Soul" is the primordial existence, remaining throughout creation, omnipresent, even as the Jivatman "individual Soul" dons a body and experiences bondage to "material objectives" and duality or (unknowing) of that omnipresence

It is the Jiva, who by its actions, attracts to itself the pudgalas (the tendencies that keep an individual re-incarnating), which results in its bondage; all that one enjoys or suffers from are the products of karmas, good or bad.

== Gaudapada’s exposition ==
Gaudapada (Gaudapada Karika III.44-45) warns that the seeker after truth should not linger on the bliss of Savikalpa Samadhi because that enjoyment (rasavada), after Laya, Vikshepa and Kasaya, is the fourth kind of obstacle in the path to Nirvikalpa Samadhi; one should be unattached through "viveka", discrimination. Attachment is a weakness of the mind as it is not easily disciplined to withdraw from the enjoyment and related effects arising out of desire. He explains: as in dreams where the mind vibrates with dual aspects, so too in the waking state these aspects seem to be all that there is but when the state of"nirati", dissolution of the mind is achieved, duality is no longer perceived. The conduct of the mind in deep sleep (when it loses itself) is not like its conduct in the controlled state (when it does not lose itself), and

ग्रहो न तत्र नोत्सर्गश्चिन्ता यत्र न विद्यते |
आत्मसंस्थं तदा ज्ञानमजाति समतां गतम् ||

"there may be no duality where all mental activity ceases: then, the jivatma attaining oneness with the knowable Brahman becomes established in the Self, unborn and poised in equality" (Gaudapada Karika III.38).

Torpidity or Laya (लय) is overwhelm of the senses and the mental state, falling asleep unable to maintain awareness of the Absolute; and distraction or Vikshepa (विक्षेप) is through failing to be able to rest the mental state on the Absolute, resting it on other things.

== Significance ==
Patanjali (Yoga Sutras II.2) – समाधि – भवनार्थः क्लेश – तनूकरनार्थश्च – assures that by cultivating the power of concentration the obstacles - which cause all suffering - in the way of enlightenment - can be removed. The obstacles he refers to are the negative effects of ignorance, egoism, attachment, aversion and the desire to cling to life. And, as regards the enjoyment of bliss attained coinciding the gain of non-conceptual knowledge Sankara advocating the understanding of the depth-meaning (lakshyatha) of the Mahavakya Tat Twam Asi, states

प्रत्यग्बोधो या आभाति द्वयानन्दलक्षणः |
अद्वयानन्दरूपश्च प्रत्यग्बोधैकलक्षणः ||

"What appears (as the Witness Consciousness within – the individual Self), is of the nature of Bliss One-without- a- second; and the one that is the Bliss within is none other than the individualized self the Witnessing Consciousness within"

– which statement means that owing to the conditioning (vikshepa) in the Jiva, the individual can experience only the "awareness" and not the "bliss" aspect of Brahman.
