= Syncretism =

Combination of distinct beliefs or schools of thought

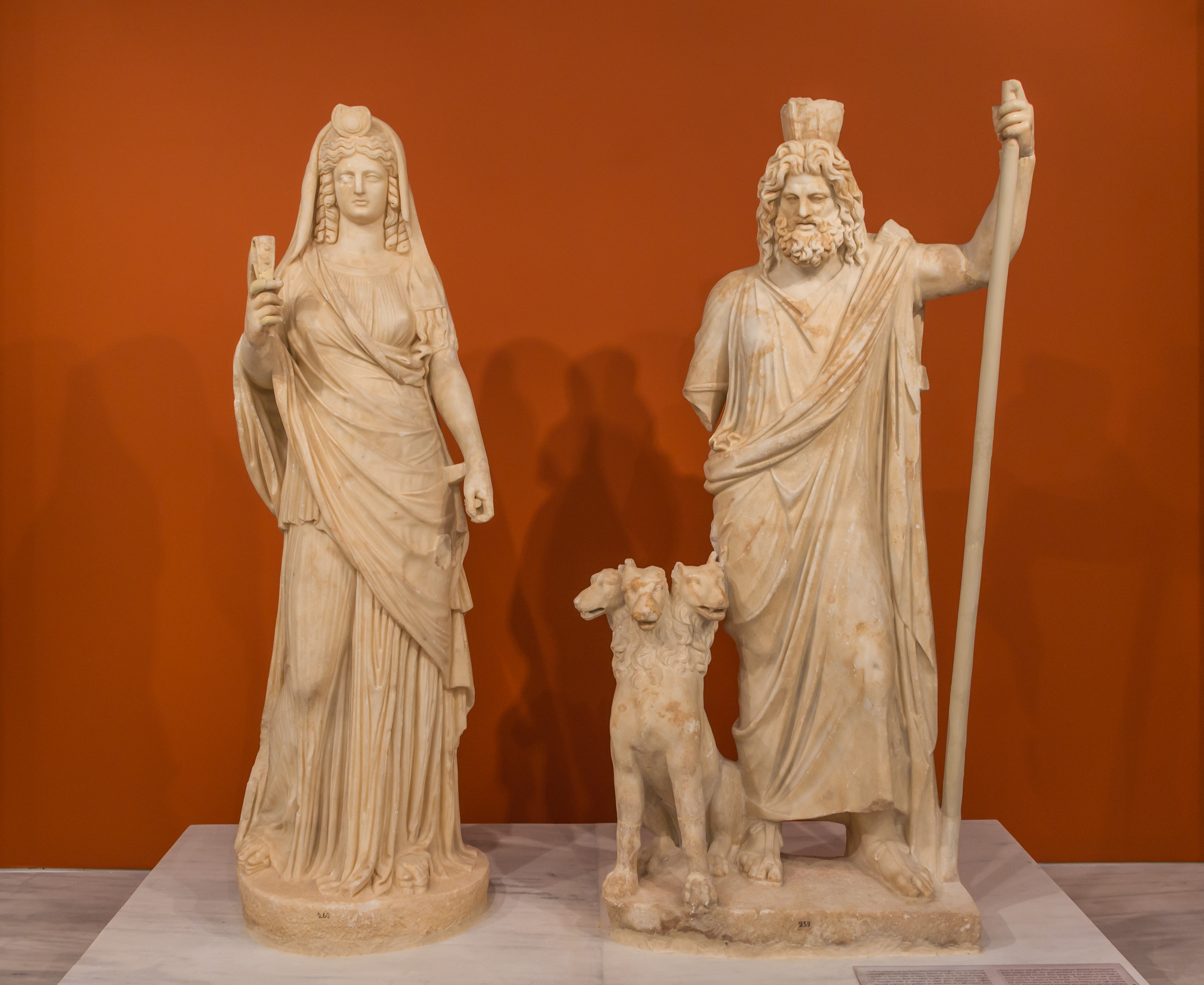
The gods Persephone–Isis and Hades–Serapis, an example of Greco-Egyptian syncretism

Syncretism (/ˈsɪŋkrətɪzəm/) is the combining or merging of various distinct beliefs or schools of thought, particularly religious ones. For instance, features and components of one religion are incorporated and absorbed into another. It can include assimilation of several originally discrete traditions, especially in theology and mythology, thus asserting an underlying unity and allowing for an inclusive approach to multiple faiths. While syncretism in art and culture is sometimes likened to eclecticism, in the realm of religion, it specifically denotes a more integrated merging of beliefs into a unified system, distinct from eclecticism, which implies a selective adoption of elements from different traditions without necessarily blending them into a new, cohesive belief system.

== Etymology ==
The English word is first attested in the early 17th century. The Oxford English Dictionary first attests the word syncretism in English in 1618. It is from Modern Latin syncretismus, drawing on the συγκρητισμός (synkretismós), supposedly meaning "Cretan federation". However, this is a spurious etymology derived from the naive idea in Plutarch's 1st-century essay "Fraternal Love (Peri Philadelphias)" in his collection Moralia. He cites the example of the Cretans, who compromised and reconciled their differences and came together in alliance when faced with external dangers. "And that is their so-called Syncretism [Union of Cretans]." A more likely etymology is from sun- ("with") plus kerannumi ("mix") and its related noun, krasis ("mixture").

== Religious syncretism ==
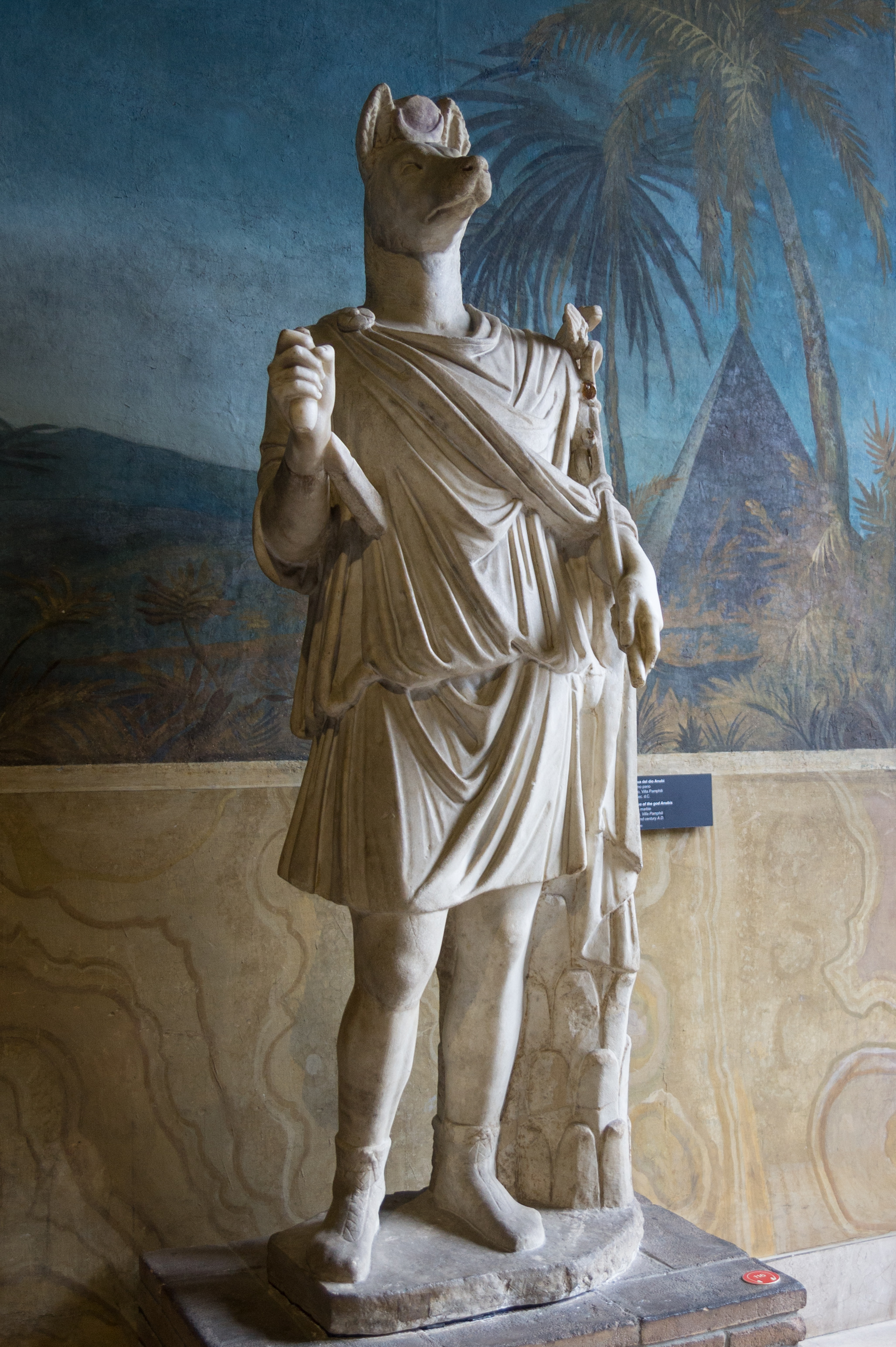
The god Hermanubis, an example of Greco-Egyptian syncretism

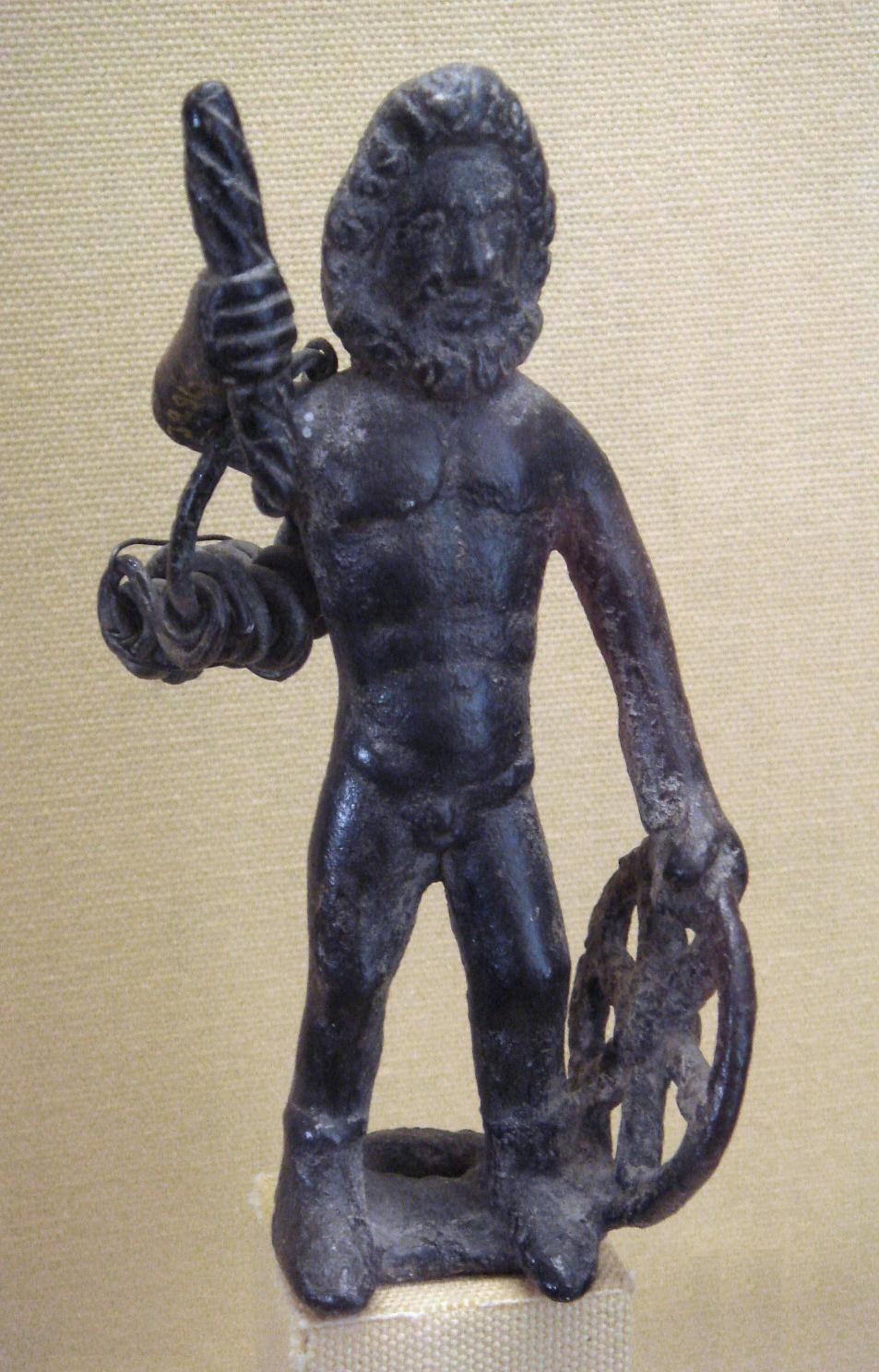
The god Taranis-Jupiter, an example of Romano-Celtic syncretism

Religious syncretism is the blending of two or more religious belief systems into a new system, or the incorporation into a religious tradition of beliefs from unrelated traditions. This can occur for many reasons. Syncretism is often the result of contact, mixing and interpenetration between different cultures. It can occur in areas where multiple religious traditions exist in proximity and function actively in a culture, or when a culture is conquered, and the conquerors bring their religious beliefs with them, but do not succeed in entirely eradicating the old beliefs or (especially) practices.

Religions may have syncretic elements to their beliefs or history, but adherents of so-labelled systems often frown on applying the label, especially adherents who belong to "revealed" religious systems, such as the Abrahamic religions, or any system that exhibits an exclusivist approach. Such adherents sometimes see syncretism as a betrayal of their pure truth. By this reasoning, adding an incompatible belief corrupts the original religion, rendering it no longer true. Indeed, critics of a syncretistic trend may use the word or its variants as a disparaging epithet, as a charge implying that those who seek to incorporate a new view, belief, or practice into a religious system pervert the original faith. Non-exclusivist systems of belief, on the other hand, may feel quite free to incorporate other traditions into their own. Keith Ferdinando notes that the term "syncretism" is an elusive one, and can refer to substitution or modification of the central elements of a religion by beliefs or practices introduced from elsewhere. The consequence under such a definition, according to Ferdinando, can lead to a fatal "compromise" of the original religion's "integrity".

In modern secular society, religious innovators sometimes construct new faiths or key tenets syncretically, with the added benefit or aim of reducing inter-religious discord. Such chapters often have a side-effect of arousing jealousy and suspicion among authorities and ardent adherents of the pre-existing religion. Such religions tend to inherently appeal to an inclusive, diverse audience. Sometimes the state itself sponsored such new movements, such as the Living Church founded in Soviet Russia and the German Evangelical Church in Nazi Germany, chiefly to stem all outside influences.

=== Criticism of the term ===
Véronique Altglas argues that the use of the term "syncretism" is an effort to make some religious practices and religions seem less legitimate, pure, or well-established. She argues that the term "syncretism" presupposes that the religions that syncretism combines were "pure" and unchanging before being combined. In reality, she believes, religions are all inherently syncretic to some degree because they combine many elements from different people's spiritualities and religions and different cultures. The term "syncretism" can serve the ends of ethnocentrism and purism in some cases in this view.

== Cultures and societies ==
According to some authors, "Syncretism is often used to describe the product of the large-scale imposition of one alien culture, religion, or body of practices over another that is already present." Others such as Jerry H. Bentley, however, have argued that syncretism has also helped to create cultural compromise. It provides an opportunity to bring beliefs, values, and customs from one cultural tradition into contact with, and to engage different cultural traditions. Such a migration of ideas is generally successful only when there is a resonance between both traditions. While, as Bentley has argued, there are numerous cases where expansive traditions have won popular support in foreign lands, this is not always so.

=== Din-i Ilahi ===
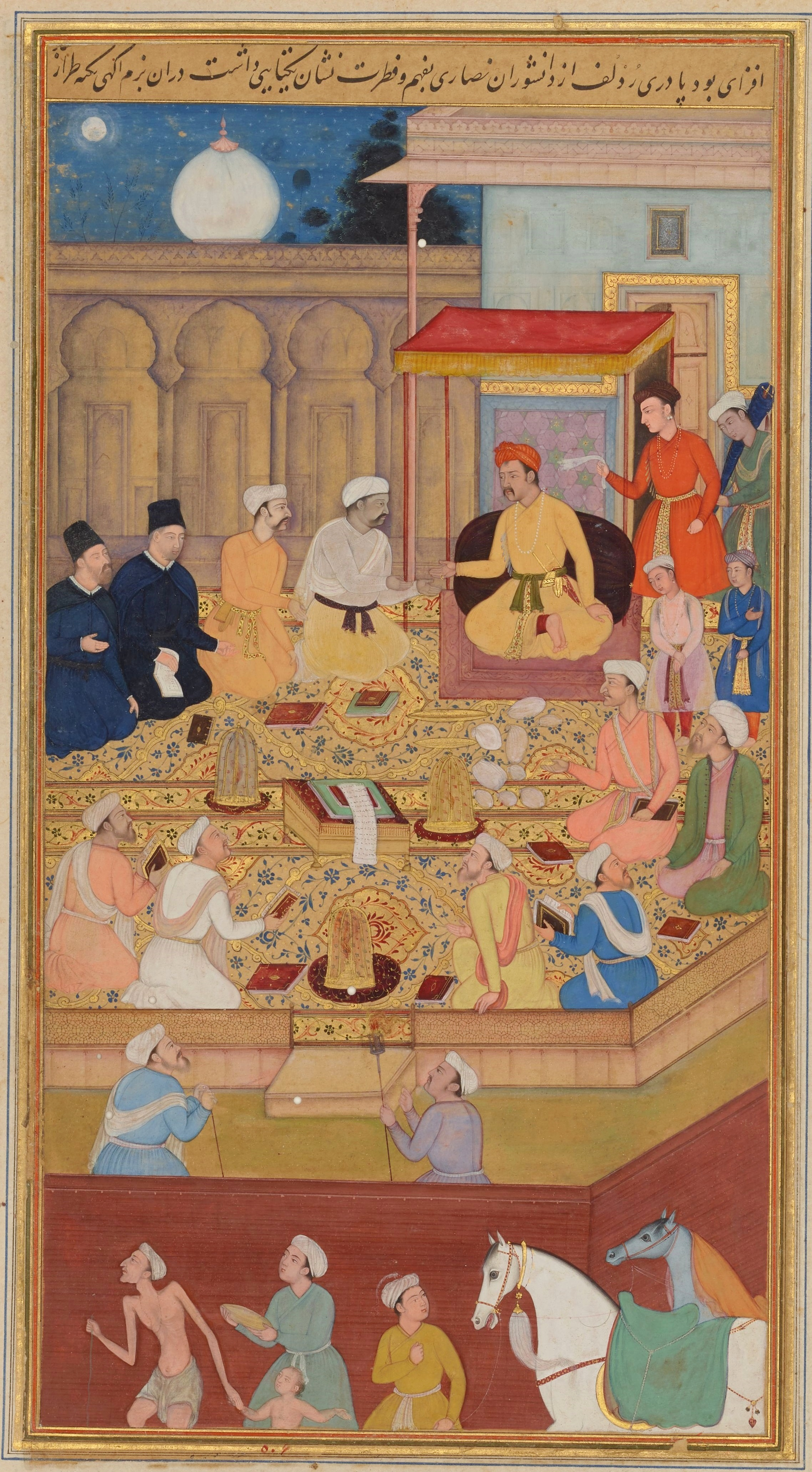
Akbar the Great holding a court discussing theology

In the 16th century, the Mughal emperor Akbar proposed a new religion called the Din-i Ilahi ("Divine Faith"). Sources disagree with respect to whether it was one of many Sufi orders or merged some of the elements of the various religions of his empire. Din-i Ilahi drew elements primarily from Islam and Hinduism but also from Christianity, Jainism, and Zoroastrianism. More resembling a personality cult than a religion, it had no sacred scriptures, no priestly hierarchy, and fewer than 20 disciples, all hand-picked by Akbar himself. It is also accepted that the policy of sulh-i-kul, which formed the essence of the Dīn-i Ilāhī, was adopted by Akbar as a part of general imperial administrative policy. Sulh-i-kul means "universal peace".

=== Enlightenment ===
The syncretic deism of Matthew Tindal undermined Christianity's claim to uniqueness. The modern, rational, non-pejorative connotations of syncretism arguably date from Denis Diderot's Encyclopédie articles Eclecticisme and Syncrétistes, Hénotiques, ou Conciliateurs. Diderot portrayed syncretism as the concordance of eclectic sources. Scientific or legalistic approaches of subjecting all claims to critical thinking prompted at this time much literature in Europe and the Americas studying non-European religions such as Edward Moor's The Hindu Pantheon of 1810, much of which was almost evangelistically appreciative by embracing spirituality and creating the space and tolerance in particular disestablishment of religion (Note: or its stronger form, official secularisation, as in France) whereby believers of spiritualism, agnosticism, atheists and in many cases more innovative or pre-Abrahimic based religions could promote and spread their belief system, whether in the family or beyond.

== Examples ==
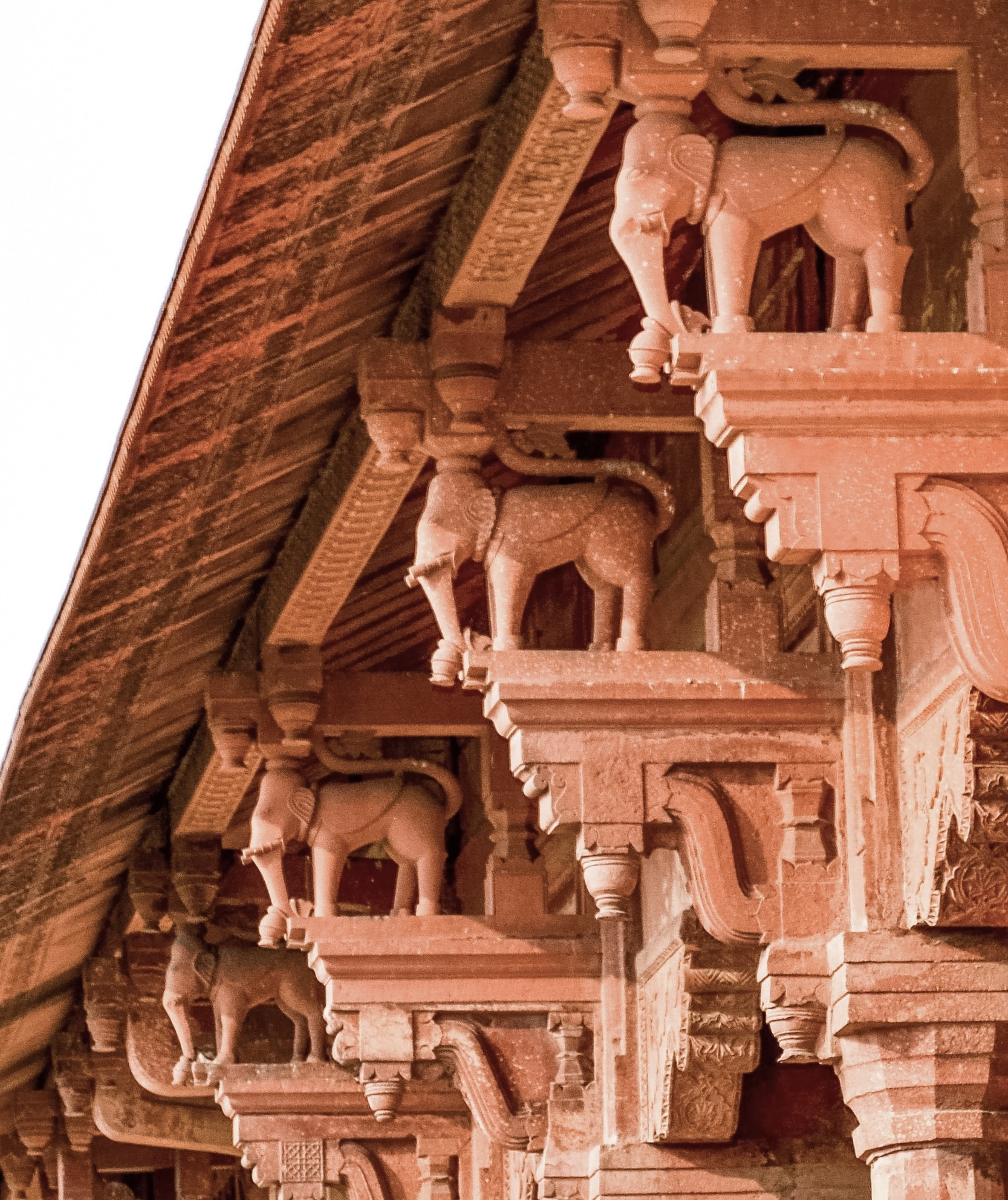
The use of elephant-shaped column brackets in buildings of the Lahore Fort reflects Hindu influences on Mughal Architecture during the reign of Akbar even though Islam generally forbids representation of living figures.

Overt syncretism in folk belief may show cultural acceptance of an alien or previous tradition, but the "other" cult may survive or infiltrate without authorized syncresis. For example, some conversos developed a sort of cult for martyr-victims of the Spanish Inquisition, thus incorporating elements of Catholicism while resisting it.

The Kushite kings who ruled Upper Egypt for approximately a century and the whole of Egypt for approximately 57 years, from 721 to 664 BCE, constituting the Twenty-fifth Dynasty in Manetho's Aegyptiaca, developed a syncretic worship identifying their own god Dedun with the Egyptian Osiris. They maintained that worship even after they had been driven out of Egypt. A temple dedicated to this syncretic god, built by the Kushite ruler Atlanersa, was unearthed at Jebel Barkal.

Syncretism was common during the Hellenistic period, with rulers regularly identifying local deities in various parts of their domains with the relevant god or goddess of the Greek Pantheon as a means of increasing the cohesion of their kingdom. This practice was accepted in most locations but vehemently rejected by the Jews, who considered the identification of Yahweh with the Greek Zeus as the worst blasphemy.

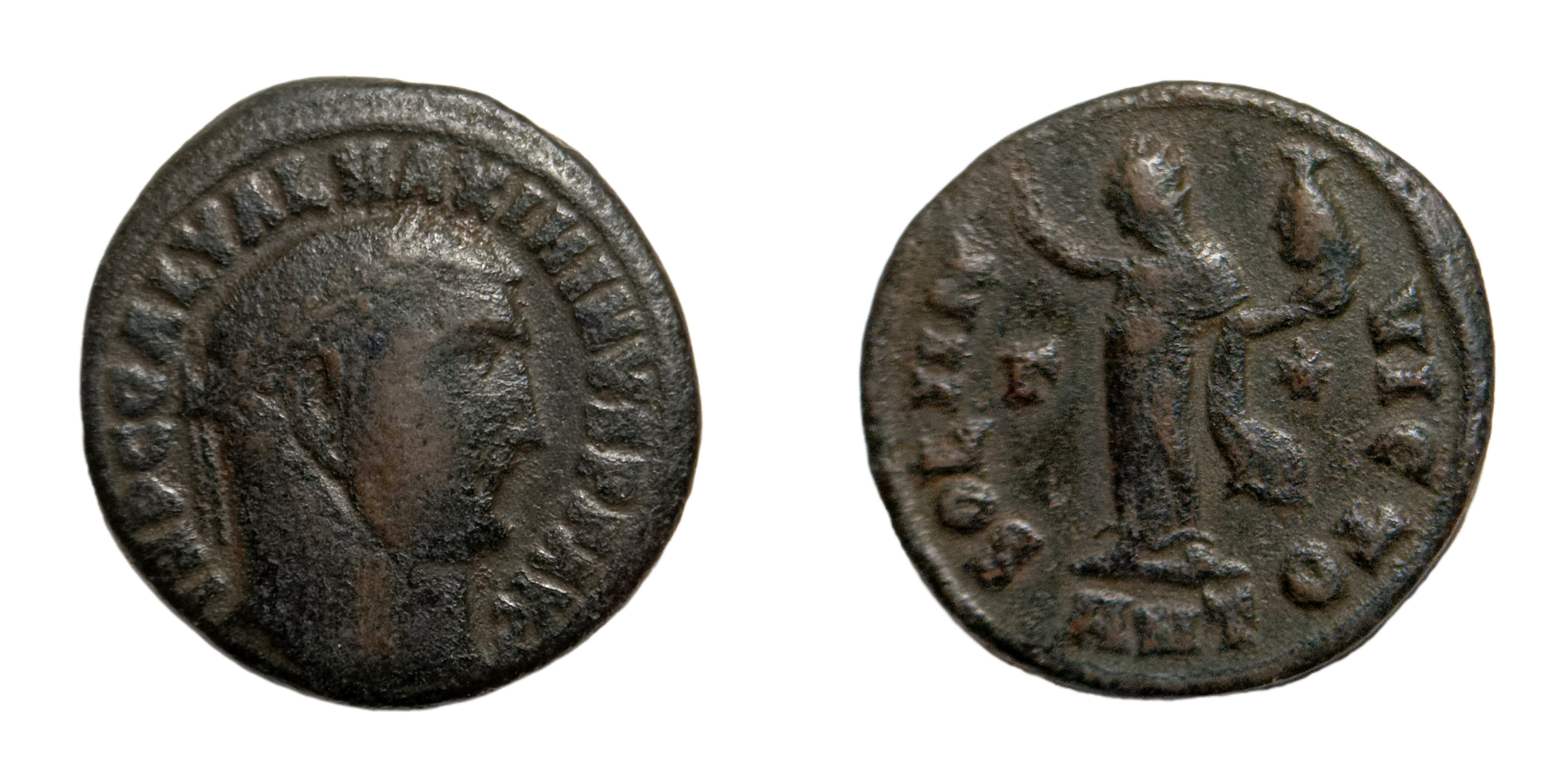
A Roman coin of Maximinus Daza. On the reverse is the Roman god Sol, holding the head of the Hellenistic god Serapis in his left hand.

The Roman Empire continued the practice, first by the identification of traditional Roman deities with Greek ones, producing a single Greco-Roman pantheon, and then identifying members of that pantheon with the local deities of various Roman provinces.

In Africa, Islam and Christianity, having largely displaced indigenous African religions, are often adapted to African cultural contexts and belief systems. Many African people may combine the practice of their traditional beliefs with the practice of Abrahamic religions.

Some religious movements have embraced overt syncretism, such as the case of melding Shintō beliefs into Buddhism or the amalgamation of Germanic and Celtic pagan views into Christianity during its spread into Gaul, Ireland, Britain, Germany and Scandinavia. In later times, Christian missionaries in North America identified Manitou, the spiritual and fundamental life force in the traditional beliefs of the Algonquian groups, with the God of Christianity. Similar identifications were made by missionaries at other locations in the Americas and Africa who encountered a local belief in a Supreme God or Supreme Spirit of some kind.

Indian influences are seen in the practice of Shia Islam in Trinidad. Others have strongly rejected it as devaluing and compromising precious and genuine distinctions; examples include post-Exile Second Temple Judaism, Islam, and most of Protestant Christianity.

Syncretism tends to facilitate coexistence and unity between otherwise different cultures and world views (intercultural competence), a factor that has recommended it to rulers of multi-ethnic realms. Conversely, the rejection of syncretism, usually in the name of "piety" and "orthodoxy", may help to generate, bolster or authenticate a sense of uncompromised cultural unity in a well-defined minority or majority.

All major religious conversions of populations have had elements from prior religious traditions incorporated into legends or doctrine that endure with the newly converted laity.

== See also ==
- Confederacy
- Conflation
- Cultural appropriation
- Cultural assimilation
- Multiculturalism
- Multiple religious belonging
- New religious movement
- Religious pluralism
