= Abhutaparikalpa =

Buddhist concept

Abhutaparikalpa is a concept that was developed by the Yogācāra/Vijñānavāda school of Buddhism with regard to definitions of reality identifying it as the dependent nature among the three natures postulated, and is described as neither empty nor not empty by adopting a neither nor position, that it is both existent and not existent. As paratantrasvabhava it exists as such but does not exist as it appears when affected by the 'subject-object duality' of parikalpitasvabhava freed from which it is the perfect nature of parinishpannasvabhava.

== Background ==
Abhūtaparikalpa or Ālayavijñāna means imagining the object to exist as independent of consciousness. It is the basic concept in the Yogācāra/Vijñānavada school which concept is identified as paratantrasvabhava (dependent nature), the second of the three natures postulated by this school. On the negative side of shunya Abhūtaparikalpa becomes associated with the imaginarily constructed duality of subject and object, but on the positive side it represents real existence in virtue of own nature. The grammatical construction of the term Abhūtaparikalpa is interpreted by Sthiramati by taking it either as locus for the constructing of duality or as instrumental for the construction of unreal duality. For the Vijnanavadins both Abhūtaparikalpa which is paratantrasvabhava and a vastu existing substantialiter, and shunyata, which is parinishpannasvabhavaca and not a vastu existing substantialiter, are real. Abhutaparikalpa is described as neither empty nor not empty by adopting a neither nor position, that it is both existent and not existent. As paratantrasvabhava it exists as such but does not exist as it appears when affected by the subject-object duality of parikalpitasvabhava freed from which it is the perfect nature of parinishpannasvabhava.

== Nature of the Twofold Consciousness ==
Consciousness is basically of two kinds: a) individual consciousness (pravrttivijnana) or mind (manas, citta or vijnana); and b) Absolute Consciousness (Alayavijnana); the former has for its basis the 'five sense cognitions', 'normal consciousness' and 'continuous consciousness'; and the latter, according to Lankavatara, is 'permanent, immortal and never-changing storehouse of Consciousness'. The object which is firstly imagined or sensed, is thought about before being perceived, at the background of all these is the synthetic unity of perception called Chitta or Alaya, also called Tathāgata-garbha. The external world is the creation not of the mind but of the Absolute Consciousness, and the force behind creation is the beginningless tendency inspired by Avidya (ignorance) in the Alaya to manifest itself as subject and as object; the locus and object of this tendency is the Alaya itself. Individual consciousness is the manifestation of the Alaya of the Buddhists, though not accepted, is like the Nirvikalpa and Nirabhasaprajnagochara Atman of the Upanishads. The Vijnanavadins aver that shunayata is not absolute negation but the negation of something in something; the superimposed alone is to be negated because it is not real.

== Buddhist Unconsciousness ==
Ālaya consciousness of the Yogācāra Buddhists is 'Buddhist Unconsciousness'. The Yogācāra Buddhists were able to recognize the unconscious structuring of experience; they were able to conceptualize the awareness of awareness and differentiate a dimension of unconscious mental process called - Ālayavijñāna, from the processes of conscious cognitive awareness – called Pravrittivijnana. The concept of Ālayavijñāna or Abhutaparikalpa arose, as a subliminal perception of the world, in response to the Abhidharmic developments of earlier Buddhist doctrines. It arose by means of twofold ever-present subtle objective support: a) by the perception of inner appropriation (upādāna-vijñapti) and b) by the outward perception of the receptacle world whose aspects are not clearly delineated (bahirdā apariccinnākāra bhājana-vijñapti). The term, ālaya, means - 'that which is clung to', 'adhered to' or 'dwelled in', and is closely connected with bodily existence. Chogyam Trungpa explains that resting in the nature of ālaya means - going beyond the six sense consciousness, and even beyond the seventh consciousness, the fundamental discursive thought process that brings about the other six. Ālaya consciousness has as its characteristics of being both cause and effect; as cause it perishes and as fruit it is born, it never remains a single entity.

== Advaita ==
Shankara in his commentary on Brahma Sutras II.ii.31, which reads "क्षणिकत्वाच्च", meaning 'And (the ego-consciousness cannot be the abode), for it is momentary', refuting the Vijnanavada notion of the ideation-store asserts that unless there be some principle running through everything at all times, there can be no human dealing involving remembrance, recognition etc., which are contingent on past impressions that are stored up in conformity with environment, time and causation, and by arguing that if the 'ideation-store' is momentary then it is subject to arguments that have been brought forth against 'momentariness', and if it is permanent there is abandonment of the principle of 'momentariness'. In this context it is said that the co-existence of the principle of 'voidness' and the principle of the imagination of unreality revealed in the Madhyata-vibhanga which replaces Prakṛti with Shunya and Purusha with Abhutaparikalpa, the imagination of unreality, attests that for the Vijnanavadins, the principles of the eternal absolute and the changing phenomenal were not mutually exclusive.
