= Anavastha =

Philosophical term from Sanskrit

As a philosophical term, anavastha refers to the non-finality of a proposition or endless series of statements or regressus ad infinitum (infinite regress). In the Hindi language, anavastha means nothingness.

== Etymology ==
Anavastha (Sanskrit: अनवस्था) is a Sanskrit nominal compound derived from the verb Stha (meaning standing, resting, grounded or founded). The expression literally means: that which does not stand down, non-resting, unstable, holding no definite position, un-grounded or without foundation. It can also mean unsettled condition or character or absence of finality or conclusion.

== Overview ==
In Indian thought and Indian logic Anavastha is an important doctrine. All major schools of philosophy have examined and commented upon this concept and laid down guidelines so as to avoid the endless series of statements and propositions and the non-finality of those propositions. Certain aphorisms of Pāṇini, in his Ashtadhyayi indicate that asiddhatva leads to anavastha since rules which cause endless repetition of application cannot be there because application of a rule should certainly result in finality. The word अत्र atra of Sutra 6.4.22 indicates that two rules must have the same आश्रय āśraya or place of operation but where their places of operation are different they are not asiddha to each other.

The automatic application of sutras (rules of grammar) to take place without generating unintended results requires the establishment of a particular sequence among the rules and also the provision for cyclical application as well as blocking of some rules whenever it is desirable to do so. Panini orders rules and methods for their activation, reactivation and non-activation, and provides that the results brought about by some rules will not be 'known' to certain other rules, so that the question of these other rules becoming activated does not arise. The best example of the application of this method is known as Asiddhatva. He uses the concept of Asiddhatva to prevent the application of a rule on the substitute, to enable its application on a substituent and to mandate its application. According to Kiparsky's definitions, Asiddhatva implies 'no order of taking effect' since asiddha means 'not having taken effect'.

== Vedic concept ==
The Upanishads speak about the two-fold Brahman, the one with attributes called the Saguna Brahman, and the other without attributes called the Nirguna Brahman only to deny and accept these two to state that Brahman is One. Brahman is called Nirguna because Brahman has not the three Gunas of Prakrti, and not because Brahman has got no gunas absolutely; in order to prove the substantive existence of Brahman (prameya), Brahman is called Saguna even though there is absence of Gunas in Brahman (aprameya). Brahman is One, and Oneness cannot be confounded with non-oneness; also oneness does not require another oneness to differentiate through second oneness or a third to differentiate the second oneness, otherwise there will be no end or conclusion.

This fallacy is Anavastha or infinite regress. The Vedas advise that Brahman must be looked at in one and one mode only. In created things differences are of three kinds – 1) Existing in oneself, 2) difference in species and 3) difference in genus. In three words denoting a) 'oneness of Brahman', the svajatiya-bheda, b) 'restriction', the svagata-bheda and 3) 'rejection of duality', the vijatiya-bheda, these three differences are negated by the Sruti texts (Panchadasi Stanzas II.20&21). The created things are many, a chain of causes and effects is also present, but to avoid the fallacy of anavastha, it is necessary to consider Brahman as the root cause.

Vedanta does not admit the existence of the relation of samvaya (the inseparable inherence or concomitant cause or combining force) as subsisting between two different entities such as substance and qualities. In his Brahmasutra-bhashya II.ii.13, Sankara explains that if a samvaya relation is to be admitted to connect two things, then another samvaya would be necessary to connect it with either of the two entities that it intended to connect. Thus, there are two kinds of Anavastha - the Pramaniki, the valid infinite, and the Apramaniki, the vicious infinite. Knowledge is Chaitanya (anubhuti) i.e. Consciousness, and consciousness reveals the reality of objects. An object cannot be talked about if it does not exist.

Any attempt to find out whether the second knowledge that reveals the first knowledge identical with it is a separate knowledge or not leads to anavastha. Because the first knowledge is a revelation, there is no second knowledge that reveals the first knowledge. Consciousness cannot be perceived, it perceives itself and is not perceived by any greater source; the logical fallacy of Anavastha (an endless series of cause and effect) would exist if it were to be said that Consciousness requires another source of perception (Devi GitaIV.12-13). If there is no eternal First Cause, the logical fallacy of Anavastha Dosha is inevitable. Brahman, the First cause, has no origin (Brahma Sutra II.3.9) Thus, a thing cannot be at the same time the object and the subject of action. Consciousness i.e. Chaitanya, is self-illuminating and it illuminates others by its own illumination. Kumārila Bhaṭṭa enquires, if an omniscient person exists that person can become comprehensible only to some other omniscient personality, and so on.

== Yoga concept ==
In Yoga, Ecstasy is the yogic visualization of a deity. And, the beginning five states of ecstasy induced by Cakra are – birth, childhood, youth, maturity and adulthood; the 6th is unmana ( also said to denote the dreaming state) meaning agitation or excitement when the devotee often swoons; and when this occurs and when the strong desire to experience the ultimate parabrahman holds complete sway then the 7th state i.e. manollasa (extreme exhilaration) or anavastha (the state beyond states or state without qualities or locale)(also said to denote the dreamless sleep) is reached (Kularnava-tantra. Stanza 82). Patanjali calls the unsteadiness of intelligence as the unsettled state of anavastha because due to vritti the tracing of the steady state of the Self is difficult and therefore the splendour of the Self is doubted.

== Jaina concept ==
According to Hemachandra, Anavastha is a Dosha, a defect or fault along with virodha, vaiyadhikarana, samkara, samsaya, vyatikara, apratipatti and abhava. It is also one of the dialectical principles applied alongside atmasraya, anyonyasraya, cakraka, atiprasanga, ubhayatahspasa and the like employed by logicians from very early times. Sriharsa explains that dialectical reasoning, which has its foundation in pervasion, can lead to contradiction when the reasoning becomes fallacious, it is the limit of doubt; and since differing unwanted contrary options create new doubts difficult to resolve which lead to anavastha or infinite regress and there is the absence of finality.

The argument that contradiction cannot block an infinite regress is rejected; it is the doubter's own behaviour that process the lie to the doubt, that blocks it (pratibandhaka). According to the Jains, in the Jiva five states are possible which can manifest themselves simultaneously of these the Audayika-bhava is the state which is the consequence of the unhindered realization of the Karman, which state comprises all accidental attributes of the Jiva which become apparent with the udaya of karman. This particular state has 21 sub-species beginning with asiddhatva, which is the state of unholiness, when the spiritual perfection is lacking.

== Buddhist concept ==
Nagarjuna states that if there is a characteristic of the conditioned other than origination (utpada), existence (stithi), and destruction (bhanga), there would be infinite regress (anavastha). If there is no such characteristic, these are not conditioned (na samskrta). The quest to find the origination of origination which originations are all conditioned by dharma is a never-ending cycle and leads to infinite regress. And that, whenever one wants to know how cognitions are grasped by other cognitions that attempt will lead to anavastha i.e. infinite regress, because if anything in objective experience with the particular property of acting on itself cannot be cited one has no grounds to assert that something that cannot be experienced has that unthinkable property. If pramanas are established through other pramanas it would result in infinite regress, then nothing can be established.

Negation can be of an existent self-nature, if that self-nature does not exist it cannot be negated; the negation of non-existent entity is established without words.(Vigrha-vyartani Karika Stanza 11). The Abhidharma system which attributes svabhava to dharma because dharmas, the foundational components of the world, are independent of causes and conditions in a specific sense, retains the concept that dependently originated entities (pratityasamutpanna) are separate from the dependently designated entities (prajnaptisat). Nagarjuna tends to equate lack of svabhava with dependence on causes and conditions and not with parts, and his argument that dependently originated things lacked svabhava and were prajnaptisat or conventionally existing entities, and that all dharmas are prajnapisat does lead to an infinite regress or anavastha and is, therefore, not valid. Samyutta Nikaya summarises the doctrine of 'dependent-origination' in terms of the necessary conditions for something to be, which doctrine is applied by Sarvastivadins to determine whether or not an entity ultimately existed.
