= Aikyam =

Aikyam (Sanskrit: ऐक्यम्) means – oneness, unity, harmony, unanimity, identity or sameness or identical. The Upanishads address two fundamental ideas – Brahman and the Atman; as a rule these terms are used synonymously, there is no difference between these two. The main theme of Vedantic teaching is identity of the individual and the Total (jiva isvara aikyam), that the self (Atman) and awareness (Chaitanya) are identical (aikyam). Aikyam means oneness or identity.

== Vedic purport ==
The Vedas are part of oral tradition, therefore they are called Śruti (that which is heard), Upanishads, known as the Vedanta, are the destroyer of bondage. The oneness of the Individual Self and the Universal Self (jīvātma paramātma aikyam) is Śrutisara, the ultimate purport of the Vedas. In the compound word – Brahman atman aikyam, unity of the Brahman and the Atman, is described the fundamental dogma of the Vedanta system.

The Vedic Rishis tell us – सत्त्वानुरूपा सर्वस्य श्रद्धा भवति – that undoubtedly the faith of all men conforms to their mental constitution, they speak about the two Unmanifests – the one which transforms itself and causes other transformations, and the other one that supports the former it had projected with the intention of commencing creation, although there is no real difference between these two. Rishi Dirghatamas (Rig Veda I.163.4) prays to Agni thus:-

त्रीणि त आहुर्दिवि बन्धनानि त्रीण्यप्सु त्रीण्यन्तः समुद्रे |
उतेव मे वरुणश्च्छन्त्स्यर्वन्यत्रा त आहुः परमं जनित्रम् ||
"The place of your origin or birth is the same as that of mine; if you are endowed with strength I too possess the same strength; O the bright one! If you so happen to exist in three states or forms (gross, subtle and causal) so does water (the finest divine aspects) and the earth (the gross supporting aspect) and all objects (the entire transformation of the First Cause) dispersed in space (as existing outside and within) have three forms, O learned one! if your birth and knowledge is divine so is mine. "

This unique awareness of Sameness which is actually the awareness of Oneness is the knowledge of Reality, the true knowledge of existence, gaining which knowledge the true seeker ceases to see difference in this vast world of "variety" which difference is seen only as so many names echoing and re-echoing persistently in one's mind. Rishi Venobhargavah (Rig Veda IX.85.9) also speaks about the same knowledge of Oneness when he prays:-

अधिद्यामस्थाद्वष्भो विचक्षणोऽरूरुचद्वि दिवो रोचना कविः |
राजा पवित्रमत्येति रोरुवद्दिवः पीयूषं दुहते नृचक्षसः ||

and tells us about the stars and celestial luminaries dotting the sky shining because of the light of the self-effulgent Brahman shining brightly revealing everything and providing strength and stability (अधिद्यामस्थात्), who is pure and the source of amrita (पीयूषं) desired by the learned people (नृचक्षसः), who is the giver of happiness and who is the deliverer being the only source of immortality.201-203

== Vedanta contention ==
Vedantasara explains that the subject (visheya) is the identity of the individual self and Brahman, which is of the nature of Pure Intelligence (wherein all ideas of separation and variety are effaced) and is to be realized – सर्वे वेदा यत् पदमामनन्ति – That goal which all the Vedas declare (Katha Upanishad I.ii.15), and that the connection (sambandha) is the relation between that identity which is to be realized and the evidence of the Upanishads that establishes it, as between a thing to be known and that which tells of it.p. 16

sankara states that the notion of a multitude of souls is valid only at the level of the empirical world. While the Atman stays within the limits of the body, emotions and intellect, there cannot be any dissolution, any absolute unity (sarvarthā- aikyam) with Brahman; the soul is only the reflection of the higher ātman. There is only one reality. That about which the cognition does not change is sat – real and that about which cognition keeps changing or is negated is asat – unreal; the Atman or Brahman alone being unchangeable and un-negatable is the only sat or Reality.

== Objections ==
According to Madhavacharya, aikyam cannot be real at all; if it were, the absolutism would have vanished. The Absolute is the only reality, aikyam cannot be another reality. And, Nagarjuna explains – if there were to be identity of cause and effect, then there would be oneness of producer and the produce; if there were to be difference between cause and effect, then the cause would be equal to a non-cause.
