= Vedantasara (of Sadananda) =

15th century text by Sadananda

Vedantasara, Essence of Vedanta, is a 15th-century Advaita vedanta text written by Sadananda Yogendra Saraswati.

== Authorship ==
Its author, Sadananda Yogendra Saraswati, was the son of Anantadeva Apadeva, and probably lived in the mid-15th Century A.D. He also wrote Vedantasiddhanta-sarasangraha, Bhavaprakasa on Bhagavad Gita and Brahmasutra-tatpryaprakasa.

Sadananda, the author of Advaitabrahmasiddhi, published by Asiatic Society of Bengal, is a different author.

== Themes ==
The Vedantasara is based on Gaudapada’s Karika, Upadesasahasri of Adi Shankara, Panchadasi of Vidyaranya who died in 1386 A.D., and the Naishkarmayasiddhi of Suresvara.

The Vedantasara presents Sutratman (text) as Viraj, the prime means to reach knowledge of Atman and Brahman. Only the liberated Self-knower realizes Brahman.

Just like the Dṛg-Dṛśya-Viveka the Vedantasara adds samadhi to the triad of sravana ('hearing'), manana ('reflection') and nididhyasana ('repeated meditation').

== Contents ==
The Vedantasara is divided into six chapters and contains 227 verses.

- Chapter I has thirty-one verses dealing with the preliminaries that begin with an Introductory Prayer and immediately thereafter takes up for discussion the Subject-matter of Vedanta, the Qualifications for the study of Vedanta and the Necessity of a Guru. Advayānanda was the Guru of Sadānanda. Vedanta is the evidence of the Upanishads, the Brahma Sutras and the various commentaries on these texts and the Bhagavad Gita. The Nitya (daily), Naimittika (occasional) and Prayscitta (purifying) works purify the mind, Upasanas are not karmas, the former lead to the Pitruloka and the latter, to the Satyaloka.
- Chapter II has ninety verses dealing with Adhyasa, i.e. Superimposition, which is the superimposition of the unreal on the real due to ignorance, its individual and collective aspects, the nature of Turiya, the experience of pure consciousness, the extensions of Ignorance, the nature of the Subtle Bodies, the nature of the Gross Bodies and the Limit of Superimposition. Sadananda explains why the characteristic of ignorance is its very unintelligibleness, that it is without support and contradictory to all reasoning.
- Chapter III has fifteen verses and takes up for discussion the Jiva and Superimposition with a view to establishment of the true nature of the Self (Brahman), and in that context discusses the views of the Carvakas, of the Buddhists, of the Mimamsakas and the Sunyavadins, the followers of Nāgārjuna. The Self is too subtle for ordinary understanding, the views of other differing schools gradually train the mind to dwell on finer and finer aspects of the Self.
- Chapter IV has forty-four verses dealing exclusively with De-superimposition, going back into the Final Cause, the meaning of "Thou art That" (Tat Tvam Asi) and "I am Brahman" (Aham Brahman Asmi). Truth does not become known till it is made to reveal itself. Sadananda explains that because it is impossible to conceive the same word as indicating a part of its own meaning as well as the meaning of another word, and when the meaning is directly expressed by the other word it does not require the application of Lakshana to the first word to indicate it.
- Chapter V has thirty-five verses and prescribes the Steps to Self-Realization, lays emphasis on the Study of Vedantic texts, explains Reflection and Meditation, Samadhi and its nature and varieties, Samadhi and Sleep, The Eightfold Practice and the Obstacles to Samadhi and their Removal.
- Chapter VI has twelve verses which deal with the Jivanmukta (liberated being), the Characteristics of the Jivanmukta and the Attainment of Kaivalya or Absoluteness.

== Commentaries ==
The earliest commentaries on Vedantasara of Sadananda, that incorporates pre-Sankara, Sankara and post-Sankara teachings, are Subodhini written in 1588 A.D. by Nrisimhasaraswati of Varanasi, Balabodhini by Apadeva, the renowned authority on Purva Mimamsa, and Vidvanmanoranjani by Ramatirtha.

== See also ==
- Aikyam
- Anubandha chatushtaya

== Sources ==
=== Printed sources ===
- Boetzelaer, Johan Maurits van (1971), Sureŝvara's Taittiriyopaniŝadbhaŝyavartikam, Brill Archive
- Fort, Andrew O. (1998), Jivanmukti in Transformation: Embodied Liberation in Advaita and Neo-Vedanta, Suny Press, ISBN 9780791439036
- Kapoor, Subodh (2002), Encyclopaedia of Vedanta Philosophy, Genesis Publishing
- Nikhilananda, Swami (1931), Vedantasara of Sadananda (PDF), Advaita Ashrama
- Nikhilananda, Swami (1990), Vedantasara of Sadananda, Advaita Ashrama
