= Kasaya (surname) =

Kasaya is a Japanese surname. Notable people with the surname include:

- Leonida Kasaya (born 1993), Kenyan volleyball player
- Yukio Kasaya (born 1943), Japanese ski jumper
