= The Hindu Pantheon =

1810 UK book by Edward Moor

The Hindu Pantheon was a book written by Edward Moor, an early European scholar of Indian religion. It was published in London in 1810.

The Hindu Pantheon was illustrated with examples from Moor's own collection of Hindu artifacts, which are currently displayed in the British Museum. Many of the illustrations were engraved by William Blake.

The Hindu Pantheon is illustrative of the Enlightenment concept of education of foreign cultures and religions; it was significant as it sought to dispel any European preconceptions that Hinduism was a largely primitive pagan religion. This book is also noted as of the first to provide a careful presentation of Hinduism to an English audience.

A copy of the book The Hindu Pantheon is available on Google books and can be downloaded at no cost.

== Chapters ==
- Preface
- Brahman
- Brahma
- Vishnu
- Siva
- Narayana
- Viraj &c.
- Brahmadicas &c.
- Rishis &c.
- Menus &c.
- Munis &c
- Pandus, Rudras &c.
- Vasus, Maruts &c.
- Pitris, Danavas & c.
- Surs & c.
- Asparas &c.
- Viraj &c. (2)
- Swayambhuva
- Prithu and Prithivi and Viswacarma
- The Sacti subtitled: Consorts, or Energies of Male Deities
- Sects of Hindus
- Saraswati
- Lakshmi
- Parvati
- Ganesa, Kartikya, Vira Bhadra and Bhairava the offspring of Mahadeva and Parvati
- Avataras
- Indra and Genii, subordinate to him
- Varuna
- Kuvera
- Nirrit
- Surya, Chandra and Agni, subtitled: the REGENTS of the SUN, the MOON and of FIRE; and of some less important characters
- Yama, Sani and Vrihaspati, subtitled: the REGENTS of HELL, and the PLANETS SATURN and JUPITER
- Hanuman and his Sire Pavana, Ravana and Garuda and other characters of less note
- Miscellaneous Notice of the Brahmans and Hindus
- Linga-Yoni
- Sectarial Marks, or Symbols, the Gayatri, O'm and other sacred texts and words reverenced by Hindus
- Ballaji, Wittoba and Naneshwer, Avatarasof Vishnu and Kandeh Rao Avatara of Siva
- Notice of the Unexplained Plates and of Ancient Hindu Coins and Medals
- VedasPuranas &c.
- Kama the God of Love
- Index
