= Asiddhatva =

Concept in Hindu philosophy

- Samkhya: Kapila
- Yoga: Patanjali
- Vaisheshika: Kaṇāda, Prashastapada
- Secular: Valluvar

Asiddhatva is a Sanskrit term which is derived from the word, Asiddha (Sanskrit: असिद्ध्), which means imperfect, incomplete, unaccomplished, unaffected, unproved, not existing or not having taken effect (as a rule or operation as taught in grammar) or not possessed of magic power. This term refers to the state of imperfection, incompleteness, etc.; or to the state of being imperfect or incomplete etc.; but mainly implies not in existence (Jain usage) or non-existent or no order of taking effect (Sanskrit Grammar).

== Overview ==
Asiddhatva, which means - the endless application of rules, occurs on account of conflict or when the question is of conflict, there is no asiddhatva. Asiddha means – not having taken effect with regard to the application of the other rules belonging to the same section. But, Patanjali states that rules which cause endless repetition of application cannot be there. Therefore, it is said that the application of a rule should certainly result in finality. According to Jainism, the audayika-bhava has 21 bheda or sub-species beginning with asiddhatva which is the state of unholiness, the lacking of spiritual perfection.

== Panini’s principle of asiddha ==
Ashtadhyayi reveals that Pāṇini formulates his rules of grammar in view of a samanya or 'general', visesa or 'particular' and sesa or 'residual' relationship. A particular rule is said to carve out its domain of application from within the domain of its corresponding general rule by way of an apavada i.e. exception, to its related general rule. A rule is formulated to apply and it is never regarded as completely without the scope of its application. In case two rules simultaneously apply the rule subsequent in order blocks the prior rule; though there are some exceptions. Blocking of a bahiranga or the externally conditioned rule by antaranga or the internally conditioned rule is permitted. But, since two entities can be replaced by each other the application of rules can be treated as suspended (asiddha).

Panini has used the word - asiddha, three times, that is, in Sutras 6.1.86, 6.4.22 and 8.2.1; in Sutra 6.4.22 he uses the suffix vat derived from the term vati meaning – 'as if', which indicates that simultaneous taking effect of rules in Abhiya section is not permitted. Only when a rule has taken effect does it make sense to say that it is as if it had not taken effect. The phrase purvatrasiddham of Sutra 8.2.1 tells us that the rules in tripadi can be used in a certain order only as found in Ashtadhyayi, therefore, asiddha determines in what order rules are to be applied.

== Panini’s account of Asiddhatva ==
Asiddhatva, which means - the endless application of rules, occurs on account of conflict or when the question is of conflict, there is no asiddhatva. Asiddha means – not having taken effect with regard to the application of the other rules belonging to the same section. But, Patanjali states that rules which cause endless repetition of application cannot be there. Therefore, it is said that the application of a rule should certainly result in finality. In the Ashtadhyayi of Panini the sutras are declared asidddha in the following instances:

- 1) purvatrasiddham (Sutra 8.2.1). The sutras from 8.2.1 to 8.4.68 (tripadi) are asiddha to sutras from 1.1.1. to 8.1.74 (sapadasaptadhyayi); also in tripadi the successive sutras are asiddha to their previous sutras.
- 2) asiddhavadatrabhat (Sutra 6.4.22.) The sutras from 6.4.22 to 6.4.175. are deemed asiddha to each other.
- 3) satvatukorasiddhah (Sutra 6.1.86.) The sutras from 6.1.87 to 6.1.111. are asiddha to satva sutras (8.3.39 to 8.3.119) and tuk sutras (6.1.70 to 6.1.75)

The concept of asiddhatva has been used in Ashtadhyayi

- a) to prevent the application of sutra on the substitute
- b) to enable the application of sutra on the substituent and
- c) to mandate the order of the application of sutras, and

finds its application in the viddhi sutras. As a filter- technique it applies word internally in a pre-suffixal stem-suffix relation. Sutra 6.4.22 lays down the condition of samanasryatva having the same conditioning element for asiddhatva. According to the siddha- principle, all rules interact in a transparent way, whereas the asiddha-principle is a default principle which can be defeated at cost.

== Application of rules ==
A sutra or a rule is said to be asiddha in regard to another if, with respect to this latter, it is conceived of as not to exist. The forms to which a sutra normally applies are as arise according to sutras which are siddha i.e. the rules that can have an effect. The number of forms which fall under a rule depends on the relation to sutras which are siddha. The opportunities for application of a rule to cases are determined by the sutras which are asiddha i.e. do not have an effect, by which the forms are added or excluded, that is, by the asiddhatva of the one sutra cases are added to the other or excluded from the other which are siddha. By this method the right tracing of the cases that are to conform to a rule, is secured only if, whether by sutras which are siddha or by such asiddha, those substitutions which are desired or even not desired, are secured or prevented respectively.

Sutra 6.4.22 which reads - असिद्धवदत्रभात् | (asiddhavadatrabhaat) is an adhikara sutra that defines the limits up to which it is valid as अभात् (a bhaat), in which sutra the word अत्र (atra) means - in that domain or in the domain of the same conditioning element. The rules in the asiddhavat section apply in the same conditioning (linguistic) element. The word asiddhavat is taken as a variant of the word asiddha. The purpose of a siddha is to allow an operation conditioned by a sthanin (item to be replaced) or prohibit an operation conditioned by a substitute. Asiddhatva has a blocking effect and also a feeding effect. Asiddhatva invariably leads to Anavastha.

== Jain Philosophy of Karman and Asiddhatva ==
The Jain Philosophy extends the concept of Karman beyond the good and the bad and also beyond their resultant enjoyment or punishment. Each kind of karman works with a specified intensity, and there are eight mula-prakrtis (species) of karmans depending upon their prakrti, stithi, rasa and pradesas, viz. Jnanavarana-karmans which obscure knowledge, Darsanavarna-karmanas which obscure undifferentiated cognition, Vedaniya-karmans which produce the feeling of joy and grief, Mohaniya-karmans which obstruct belief and conduct, Ayus-karmans which determine duration of life, Nama-karmans which give various factors of individuality, Gotra-karmans which define family surroundings and Antaraya-karmans which hinder Jiva's capability of resolution and enjoyment, and their numerous uttara-prakrtis (sub-species).

The Jain thinkers believe that the time during which the karmans work and the intensity with which they manifest themselves is definite and that it is possible for all karmans to increase or decrease their effects and also transform which transformation they call samkarma. Different kinds of karman which can be related to one another also establish a relationship with the Jiva (soul) and the states (bhava) produced in it by them. In the Jiva there can manifest five states – the parinamika or the essential state, the audayika or the state which is the consequence of the unhindered realisation of karmans, the aupasamika or the state produced by the suppression of the karmans, the ksayika or the state resulting from the annihilation of the karmans and the kasayopasamika or the mixed state. The audayika-bhava has 21 bheda or sub-species beginning with asiddhatva which is the state of unholiness, the lacking of spiritual perfection.

In Jain terminology asiddhatva refers to the unproved state and to the non-existent i.e. whose existence cannot be proved or to the state of non-salvation. Siddha is the soul who has attained the status of the supreme Soul by shedding all karmic matter associated with itself and then cease to interfere in the affairs of the universe. Asiddhatva leads to Anavastha which is a dosha (defect) according to Hemachandra.
