= Virāj =

Sanskrit term

Virāj (Sanskrit: विराज्, romanized: Virāj) is a word in the Sanskrit language, which indicates sovereignty, excellence, or splendour. Virāj is the mythical primeval being associated with creation who is often personified as the secondary creator.

== Hinduism ==
Virāj is born from Purusha and Purusha in turn is born from Virāj. In the Atharvaveda, Virāj is a cow or with Prana, the life-breath. In the Mahabharata Virāj is the name of the primeval being, Purusha, identified with Vishnu and Shiva(Lord Ayyappa). Manu Smriti 1.32 states that Brahman divided his body into two, one male and the other female, from the female was born Virāj who produced Svayambhuva Manu who created the ten Prajapatis. According to the Bhavishya Purana – the male was Manu and the female was Shatarupa, creation commenced with the union of Manu and Shatrupa. In the Vedanta, Virāj is identified with supreme intellect. Virāj is also the name of a metre.

Virāj is identified by Atharvaveda – 4.11.7 with Indra, Agni, Prajapati and Parameshtin (A.V.iv.11.7); with Devata, Vishnu, Savitr, Rudra, Brahmachari, Water and the world (A.V.viii.5.10), with controlling Indra (A.V.xi.5.16), with the immortal wide spreading ruling power (A.V.vii.84.1), with first and creative principle (A.V.viii.9.7), with the universe (A.V.viii.10.11), as father of Brahman (A.V.viii.9.7), with speech, the earth, the atmosphere, death (A.V.ix.10.24), with the udder of the frame of creation, Brahman being its mouth (A.V.x.7.19) and with Dhruva, the point of the heavens directly under the feet (A.V.xii.3.11).

The following four verses of Taittiriyopanishad-bhasyavartikam methodically describe Virāj:

- Verse 158 – God, cause of the regions of the universe etc., whose body consists of five elements, kindled by delusion “I am (this) All” thus has become Virāj.
- Verse 159 – Earlier than this (Virāj) is Sutram, for, if this one exists, (then also) Virāj (exists). (This is so) on account of another sruti and according to the indirect evidence (of the sruti-quotation, which reads:) "Understanding".
- Verse 160 – Setting aside (the words) "consisting of food", etc., Sutram is meant here on account of the expression: food, life (etc.,) and by virtue of reference to meditation.
- Verse 161 – Sutram preceded the origin of the product because it does not differ from being (sat) no more than clay. When it has produced the product, the cause becomes the product as it were.

Virāj, as Deva, as the first-born Fire, the first embodied being (Shiva Purana V.i.8.22), is reminiscence of the Purusha (Rig Veda X.90), in elder Upanishads this name appears thrice – once in the Brihadaranyaka Upanishad passage IV.ii.3 as "the human form that is in the left eye", and twice in the Chandogya Upanishad in passages I.xiii.2 as the stobha called Vak (Vairaj Sama) and IV.iii.8 as the food and as the eater of food, Virāj is food - virad annam bhogyatvad eva (BUBh 4.2.3). Virāj is originated from Sutram (159, BUBhV p. 431, st18/9) also called Sutratman in Vedantasara, basically of feminine gender, its masculine gender is also found in Brahma Purana I.53, its coming forth is due to delusion. Virāj is said to be food, the essence of food, identical to the pinda, food and the eater of food, to be the eldest of beings as food, to pervade all products as their material cause, to be Prajapati. Virāj is said to be released by virtue of her own nature, originated from Brahman from Virāj, Purusa or Manu. In Vedantasara it is Vaisvanara and is said to be Caitanyam (intelligence) identified by Sthulasariram, Annamayakosha and Jagrad on one hand and on the other it is Hiranyagarbha or Prana, the intelligence conditioned by Suksamasariram consisting of Vijnanamayakosha, Manomayakosha and Pranomayakosha, or Svapna; it is explained this way to systematize these notions. Sutram is the three sheaths viz., breath, manas and understanding; food is its sheath and bliss is the sheath of cause which is an adjunct of Hiranyagarbha, the highest cosmic soul, and the origin of Virāj.

The gods obtained virajam (brilliance) from Agni by means of consecration, Virāj is the year consisting of twelve months, the fire to be piled is the year, the bricks that are piled are the days and the nights, and Virāj consists of six seasons, and has thirty syllables(Yajur Veda v.6.7). In the Brāhmanas, Shri and Virāj, are identified with food (S.B.11.4.3.18), in the Atharva Veda it is extolled as the first and creative principle (A.V.8.9-10), and with Prana (A.V.xi.4.12) and it is identified with earth (S.B.12.6.1.40) (MBh.12.262.41) In the Aitareya Upanishad Virāj is the intermediary between the Atman and the world, the creation of the world by the primeval Atman was through the intermediary Virāj. It is the waking state of the Cosmic Self; the Cosmic Self as it passes through its four states Vaisvanara, Taijasa, Prajya and Atman, comes to be called the Virāj, Hiranyagarbha, Isa and Brahman respectively.

Virāj or Virāṭ of the Bhagavad Gita is the Cosmic Body within which body is concentrated the entire creation consisting of both animate and inanimate beings, and whatever else one desires to see, and which Arjuna beheld with all its manifold divisions. Adi Shankara in his Bhasya on Brihadaranyaka Upanishad I.ii.3 explains that Virāj who was born, himself differentiated or divided himself, his body and organs, in three ways...So this Prana (Virāj), although the self, as it were, of all beings, is specially divided by himself as Death in three ways as fire, air and the sun, without, however, destroying his own form of Virāj.

== See also ==
- Vyraj
