= Edward Moor =

British Indologist

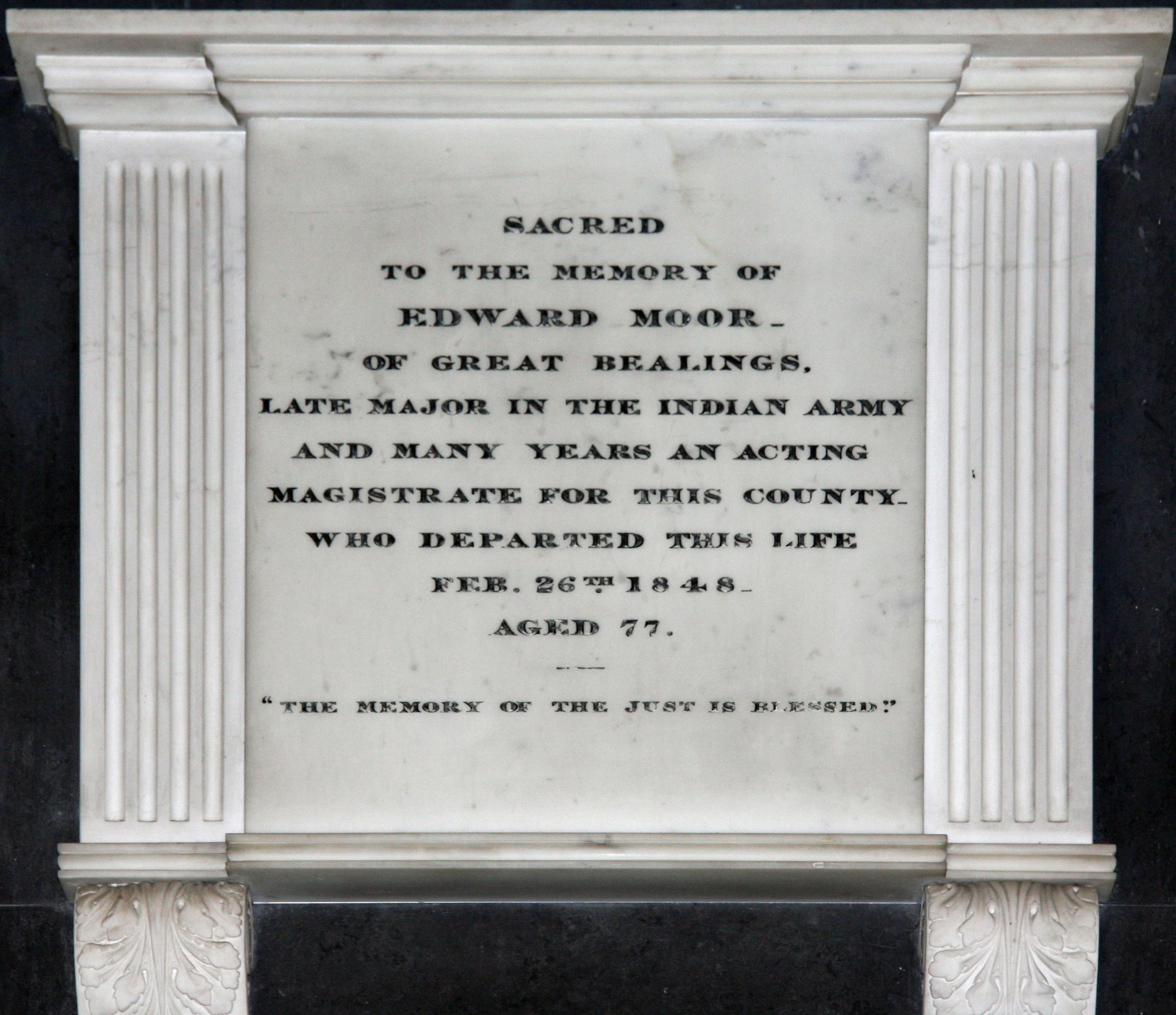
The memorial to Edward Moor in Great Bealings church

Edward Moor (1771–1848) was a British soldier and Indologist, known for his book The Hindu Pantheon, an early treatment in English of Hinduism as a religion.

== Biography ==
He was a soldier for the East India Company, joining in 1782 as a cadet. He became a brevet-captain in 1796, having been wounded in 1791 at Dooridroog, a hill fort near Bangalore, and Gadjnoor (not Doridroog and Gadjmoor, as stated in the Dictionary of National Biography).

He was made a Fellow of the Royal Society in 1806.

He married Elizabeth Lynn on 10 July 1794. She died on 13 December 1835 and was buried in the churchyard at Great Bealings on 19 December 1835.

He retired to Bealings House, Great Bealings, Suffolk in 1806. His son, Canon Edward James Moor (1800–1866) was Rector of Great Bealings from 1844 to 1886.

He died in at the house of his son-in-law, William Page Wood, in Westminster on 26 February 1848 and was buried in the churchyard at Great Bealings on 4 March 1848.

== Bealings Bells ==
While Major Moor lived in Great Bealings he experienced what he believed was a ghostly ringing of the servants' bells in the house. This began on 2 February 1834 and was alleged to have lasted fifty-three days. He described his experiences in the book Bealings Bells, published in 1841.

The mysterious bell ringing was sensationalised by paranormal writers as evidence for poltergeist activity. However, the case was critically examined by Trevor H. Hall who concluded that Moor was not a reliable witness, and had been duped by one of his servants playing a practical joke. Other writers have suggested that Moor was responsible for the bell ringing and the entire case was a hoax. Author Daniel Cohen wrote that there was "more than a suspicion" that Moor had played a joke on everyone and his book "may have been conceived as a gentle satire on investigations of other odd phenomena."

== Publications ==
- The Hindu Pantheon (1810)
- Hindu Infanticide (1811)
- Suffolk Words and Phrases (1823)
- Oriental Fragments (1834)
- Bealings Bells (1841)
