= Vikṣepa =

Translations of Vikṣepa
- English: distraction, mental wandering, desultoriness
- Sanskrit: vikṣepa, vikshepa
- Chinese: 散乱
- Tibetan: རྣམ་པར་གཡེང་བ། (Wylie: rnam par g.yeng ba; THL: nampar yengwa)

Vikṣepa (Sanskrit; Tibetan phonetic: nampar yengwa) is a Buddhist and Hindu term that is translated as "distraction", "mental wandering", etc. In the Mahayana tradition, vikṣepa is defined as the mental motion or wandering towards an object which causes the inability to remain one-pointedly on a virtuous objective.

Vikṣepa is identified as:

- One of the twenty secondary unwholesome factors within the Mahayana Abhidharma teachings
- One of the attributes of Maya in advaita vedanta. Adi Sankara mentions in his Viveka Choodamani (verse 113) that Vikshepa is an effect of Rajo Guna.

== Definitions ==
Mipham Rinpoche states:

Distraction [vikṣepa] belongs to the categories of the three poisons. It is the mental motion or wandering towards an object which causes the inability to remain one-pointedly on a virtuous objective. It can be defined as distraction towards the outer, towards the inner, and towards status.

The Abhidharma-samuccaya states:

What is desultoriness? It is to be it scatter-brain and belongs to the categories of passion-lust (raga), aversion-hatred (dvesha), and bewilderment-erring (moha). Its function is to obstruct one from becoming free of passion-lust (raga).

Alexander Berzin explains:

Mental wandering (rnam-par g.yeng-ba) is a part of longing desire (raga), hostility (dvesha), or naivety (moha). It is the subsidiary awareness that, due to any of the poisonous emotions, causes our mind to be distracted from its object of focus. If we are distracted due to longing desire, the object of our desire need not be something we are already familiar with, as in the case of flightiness of mind.

== See also ==
- Kleshas (Buddhism)
- Mental factors (Buddhism)
- Advaita

== Sources ==
- Berzin, Alexander (2006), Primary Minds and the 51 Mental Factors
- Guenther, Herbert V. & Leslie S. Kawamura (1975), Mind in Buddhist Psychology: A Translation of Ye-shes rgyal-mtshan's "The Necklace of Clear Understanding" Dharma Publishing. Kindle Edition.
- Kunsang, Erik Pema (translator) (2004). Gateway to Knowledge, Vol. 1. North Atlantic Books.
- Nina van Gorkom (2010), Cetasikas, Zolag
