= Sadananda (of Vedantasara) =

Hindu writer

Sadananda Yogendra Saraswati

Personal life
- Notable work(s): Vedantasara, Vedantasiddhanta-sarasangraha, and Bhavaprakasha on the Bhagavad Gita

Religious life
- Religion: Hinduism
- Philosophy: Hindu philosophy, Advaita

Sadananda Yogendra Saraswati, the exponent of the Advaita Vedanta as taught by Adi Shankara and the renowned author of Vedantasara which is one of the best known Prakarana Granthas (text-books) of the philosophy of the Upanishads, was the son of Anantadeva, and probably lived in mid-15th century A.D. He is also reputed to have written - Vedantasiddhanta-sarasangraha, Bhavaprakasa on Bhagavad Gita and Brahmasutra-tatpryaprakasa – which are works of equal repute and importance. Not much is known about the life of this acharya. Hiriyanna states that Sadananda of Vedantasara is different from the Sadananda of Advaitbrahmansiddhi the text that was published by the Asiatic Society of Bengal.

In his works Sadananda stresses the liberated being's freedom from bondage, detachment from the body, and constant goodness, although being beyond virtue. The liberated being after having lived out his prarabdha karma merges with Brahman.

Advayananda was the Guru of Sadananda.
