= Vikalpa =

Sanskrit philosophical term

Vikalpa is a Sanskrit philosophical term used in Hinduism and Buddhism, meaning erroneous conceptualizations ("concepts, judgements, views, and opinions") which are coloured by emotions and desires. In Yogacara, it is the split between a perceiver and objects perceived, which constructs an erroneous reification of both.

Nirvikalpa is the absence, or 'seeing-through', of these erroneous mental constructions, as aimed for in yoga and meditation, in which both the calming of the mind (samatha, samadhi) and insight into the workings of the mind (prajna, bodhi, vipassana) are sought after.

== Different senses of Vikalpa ==
In the Abhidharma-Yogacara tradition, the term vikalpa is used in three different senses:

- sensory awareness: like the eye seeing a color, which is a simple, non-conceptual perception that does not distinguish between details like blue versus yellow.
- mental activity: involves organizing and focusing sensory input.
- conceptualization: involves applying names and concepts to what is perceived and using memory to label objects.

== Vikalpa in Yoga Sutras ==
In Yoga Sutra I.9, vikalpa is defined as the use of words or expressions that do not correspond to an actual object or reality (vastu-sunya). Commentators take vikalpa to be metaphorical or figurative language that conveys meaning but lacks a basis in physical reality. For example, phrases like "consciousness is the essence of purusa" imply a distinction that does not exist in reality, purusa and consciousness are not separate entities. Similarly, expressions like "the sun rises and sets" or "time flies" are vikalpas; they do not describe literal truths but are universally understood.

Unlike pramana (accurate knowledge) and viparyaya (error), vikalpa is neither an error of judgment nor objectively real, but it is meaningful and intelligible to others. This sets it apart as a distinct vritti (mental modification) in the Yoga Sutras. Nyaya, for example, view it as a form of error.

== See also ==
- Samadhi
- No-mind
- Vikalpa-kṣaya – dissolution of dualizing thought
- a-vikalpa
- Yogaś citta-vritti-nirodhaḥ
