= Prajñā (Hinduism) =

Highest and purest form of wisdom, intelligence and understanding

Prajña (Sanskrit: प्रज्ञा) is the highest and purest form of wisdom, encompassing transcendental intelligence, consciousness, and deep understanding. Prajñā is the state of insight that surpasses knowledge acquired through reasoning or inference.

== Meaning ==
The Sanskrit word प्रज्ञा (Prajña) is the compound of "प्र (pra-)" which prefix means – before, forward, fulfiller, and used as the intensifier but rarely as a separate word and "ज्ञ (jna)" which means - knowing or familiar with.

प्रज्ञ (Prajña), meaning - wise, prudent, knowing, conversant with, is the root of प्राज्ञ (Prājña) meaning – wise, learned man, intellectual, clever, intelligence dependent on individuality; प्रज्ञा (Prajñā) meaning – intelligence, judgement, mental attitude, particular shakti or energy, insight, mental disposition, true or transcendental wisdom, awareness, mentality, understanding, discrimination, knowledge; and प्राज्ञा (Prājñā) meaning – understanding, intelligence.

In the state of deep sleep, the Atman, limited by Prana, the vital breath, is called Prājña.

== Vedic reference ==
There are a few Vedic Mantras which hint at Prājña, the wise and the learned intellectual. and so does Isha Upanishad which belongs to the Shukla Yajurveda.

Dayananda Saraswati, translating and commenting on the Rig Veda, draws attention to a sage of the Rig Veda, who tells us –

पिशङ्गरूपः सुभरो वयोधाः श्रुष्टीवीरो आयते देवकामः |
प्रजां त्वष्टा वि ष्यतु नाभिमस्मे अथा देवानाम प्येतु पाथः ||२.३.९ ||

that the radiant one, who feeds and nourishes, who ensures births, who desires association with the learned, he surely soon gains wide varied knowledge (and becomes intelligent and aware). And, to Vishwamitra, who tells us -

यदद्य त्वा प्रयति यज्ञे अस्मिन् होतिश्च्कितवोऽवृणीमहीह |
ध्रुवमया ध्रुवमुताशमिष्ठाः प्रजानन् विद्वान् उप याहि सोमम् ||३.२९.१६ ||

that those who constantly strive to understand the ways and methods of the objective world and its origin and its being surely attain divinity (aishvarya). Sayana commenting on mantra III.27.7 observes that the most common meaning of māyā are prajñā ('intelligence') and kapata ('deceit') and that kratu of the compound-word Sukratu in mantra I.20.8 implies either karma (act) or prajñā ('knowledge').

== Upanishadic reference ==
The third chapter of the Aitareya Upanishad teaches – तत्प्रज्ञानेत्रम् प्रज्ञाने प्रतिष्ठितं प्रज्ञानेत्रो लोकः प्रज्ञानं ब्रह्म (III.i.3) that all that exist, all phenomena cosmic and psychical, are rooted in Prajñā i.e. Consciousness, and Consciousness is Brahman, in which regard Adi Sankara in his commentary states that Brahman gets the respective names and forms as conditioned by the divergent bodies; it is the same entity that has become diversified under all the conditions and is known in every way and is thought of multifariously by all creatures as well as logicians. And, in the Kaushitaki Upanishad III.iii.4, Indra describes 'Death' as complete absorption in Prana when Prānā and Prajñā ('consciousness' or 'self'), which together live in the body and together depart, become one. The main theme of Kaushitaki Upanishad is that without Prajñā the senses do not work, which is knowledge, for by knowledge one sees clearly; Prajñā is Brahman and all things are rooted in Brahman. Prānā is Prajñā, self-consciousness. It is Prajñā that takes possession of Speech, and by speech one obtains words; takes possession of the nose, and one obtains odours; takes possession of the eye, and one obtains all forms; takes possession of the ear, and one obtains all sounds; takes possession of the tongue, and one obtains all tastes of food; takes possession of the hands, and one obtains all actions; takes possession of the body, and one obtains pleasure and pain; takes possession of the organ, one obtains happiness, joy and offspring; takes possession of the feet, one obtains all movements and takes possession of mind, and one obtains all thoughts, without Prajñā, no thoughts succeed.

The Vedantasara tells us that Brahman is to be thought of as being Nirguna, without attributes; Brahman is the sole reality, everything else is Anatman, non-existence and non-knowledge. Ignorance is two-fold; Brahman in relation of totality of ignorance as Ishvara has all the attributes of the creator and the ruler of the world but in relation to special ignorance is the individual soul, the defective intelligence, Prājña (प्राज्ञ) – अस्य प्राज्ञात्वमस्पष्टोपाधितयानतिप्रकाशकत्वात् ||४४||. Intelligence in its invisible form refers to Brahman – आनन्दभुक् चेतोमुखः प्राज्ञः ("Prājña, the enjoyer of bliss, with Consciousness for its aid" (Mandukya Upanishad 5)), the all-knowing reality, in its visible form it is the parviscient Jiva which is able to differentiate itself from Ishvara – सता सोम्य तदा सम्पन्नो भवति ("Then (in dreamless sleep), my dear, he (Jiva) becomes one with Existence (Ishvara) " (Chandogya Upanishad VI.viii.1)).

Gaudapada, in his Karika on the Mandukya Upanishad, refers to the three states of consciousness, to the one Atman perceived threefold in the same body and the threefold satisfaction; he refers to Vaisvanara – जागरितस्थानो बहिष्प्रज्ञः whose sphere of action is the waking state, to Taijasa – स्वप्नास्थानोऽन्तःप्रज्ञः whose sphere is the dream state, and to Prājna (प्राज्ञ), whose sphere in the form of cause only is deep sleep bereft of dreams, as a mass of consciousness, as the Akasha in the heart and as the blissful one. He states that 'Dream' is the wrong apprehension of reality, 'Sleep' is the state in which one does not know what reality is; when the false experience in these two states disappears Turiya is realized (Gaudapada Karika I.vii.15). And, Yajnavalkya in Brihadaranyaka Upanishad advises that the intelligent seeker of Brahman, learning about the Self alone, should practice wisdom (prajñā) and not think of too many words, for that is exhausting to the organ of speech.

Swami Gambhirananda explains that the state where the sleeper does not desire any enjoyable thing and does not see any dream is deep sleep, and Prājna is the doorway to the experience of the dream and waking states. Prājña is the Self as the universal person in deep sleep. Yajnavlkya tells Janaka that Chidaksha, the Self of the nature of Consciousness, is consciousness behind intelligent sound and the source of Shabda Brahman whose primary form is Aum which word is to be meditated upon as Prajñā ('Knowledge'), the inmost consciousness.

== Bhagavad Gita reference ==
In the Bhagavad Gita, there is a discourse on sthita-prajñasya (Sanskrit: स्थितप्रज्ञस्य), in which the Krishna describes the qualities of a person with steady intellect. S. N. Dasgupta argues that prajñā is not the realization of a specific philosophical truth, but it denotes a psychological state of equanimity, a "fixed and unperturbed state of the mind" where one acts free from attachment and is undisturbed by life's circumstances.

In his commentary on the Bhagavad Gita, Shankara gives prajñā a special philosophical meaning, defining it as "I am Brahman" (aham brahma asmi). This wisdom that arises specifically from the practice of discriminating the Self (Atman) from the not-Self. In Vivekacudamani, Shankara defines prajñā as a unique mental state (vrtti) that is without an object (nirvikalpa) and consists of nothing but pure consciousness (cinmatra).

== Yogic reference ==
In Yoga Sutras II.27, Patanjali describes prajñā as unfolding in seven stages, which Vyasa interprets as key realizations such as understanding suffering, eradicating its causes, and perceiving the distinction between purusha (pure consciousness) and buddhi (intellect). Beyond this point, effort ceases and the final stages involve the dissolution of the gunas, the cessation of mental activity, and the ultimate liberation of purusha in its liberated state (kevala).

The Yoga Sutras of Patanjali cover the intellectual plane from the average level of awareness to the enlarged dimension of super consciousness. According to Patanjali, Samadhi is the last aspect of the eight-fold path which leads to realisation of Yoga which unites the mortal with the immortal and Prajñā is the state of perfection, the one, total indivisible entity. The perfect yogi on attaining this Supreme state becomes a total non-entity. Patanjali states – तस्य वाचकः प्रणवः that the word which express Him is Om but mere repletion of Om is insufficient, for one should also meditate upon its meaning for gaining knowledge of the Atman and destruction of the obstacles to that knowledge on road to reaching Nirvichara Samadhi when the mind becomes pure and – ऋतम्भरा तत्र प्रज्ञा in that Samadhi, knowledge is said to be filled with truth which knowledge goes beyond inference and scriptures.
