= Mahāvākyas =

Aspect of the Upanishads

The Mahāvākyas (sing.: mahāvākyam, महावाक्यम्; plural: mahāvākyāni, महावाक्यानि) are the 'Great Sayings' of the Upanishads, with mahā meaning 'great' and vākya ''sentence'. The Mahāvākyas are traditionally considered to be four in number, though actually five are prominent in the post-Vedic literature:

1. Tat Tvam Asi (तत् त्वम् असि) – literally translated as 'That Thou Art' ('That is you' or 'You are that'), appears in Chandogya Upanishad 6.8.7 of the Sama Veda, with tat in Ch.U. 6.8.7 referring to *sat, 'the Existent', and contextually understood as 'That's how [thus] you are', with tat in Ch.U. 6.12.3 referring to 'the very nature of all existence as permeated by [the finest essence]'.
2. Ahaṁ Brahmāsmi (अहं ब्रह्मास्मि) – 'I am Brahman', or 'I am absolute' (Brihadaranyaka Upanishad 1.4.10 of the Yajur Veda)
3. Prajñānaṁ Brahma (प्रज्ञानं ब्रह्म) – 'Prajñāna (Note: "Consciousness", "intelligence", "wisdom") is Brahman' (Note: "The Absolute", "infinite", "the Highest truth"), or 'Brahman is Prajñāna' (Aitareya Upanishad 3.3 of the Rig Veda)
4. Ayam Ātmā Brahma (अयम् आत्मा ब्रह्म) – 'This Self (Atman) is Brahman' (Mandukya Upanishad 1.2 of the Atharva Veda)
5. Sarvaṃ Khalvidaṃ Brahma – 'All this indeed is Brahman'(Chāndogya Upaniṣad 3.14.1)

Mahāvākyas are instrumental in Advaita Vedanta, as they are regarded as valid scriptural statements that reveal the self (ātmán), which appears as a separate individual existence (jīva), is, in essence, non-different (not two-ness) from Brahman, which, according to Advaita, is nirguna. In contrast, these statements are less prominent in most other Hindu traditions, which emphasize a qualified or dualistic relationship between the self and Brahman, whom they regard as saguna, often identified with Vishnu, Shiva, Shakti, etc.

== Origins ==
People who are initiated into sannyasa in Advaita Vedanta are being taught the four [principal] mahavakyas as four mantras, "to attain this highest of states in which the individual self dissolves inseparably in Brahman". According to the Advaita Vedanta tradition, the four Upanishadic statements indicate the real identity of the individual (jivatman) as sat (the Existent), Brahman, consciousness. According to the Vedanta-tradition, the subject matter and the essence of all Upanishads are the same, and all the Upanishadic Mahavakyas express this one universal message in terse and concise statements. In later Sanskrit usage, the term mahāvākya came to mean "discourse", and specifically, a discourse on a philosophically lofty topic. (Note: Sanskrit Structure)

The concept of mahavakyas has a prehistory in Mimamsa, where it differs from its use in Advaita Vedanta. Instead of denoting a concise philosophical truth, a mahavakya in Mimamsa is a complex sentence that integrates and finalizes the meaning of smaller sentences (avantara-vakya). This structure follows the principle of paryavasana (completion), where the larger sentence absorbs its parts to become the primary source of authority. In full form, a mahavakya serves as a Vedic "ritual manual", unifying all instructions into a guide for performing the ritual.

== Tat Tvam Asi ==
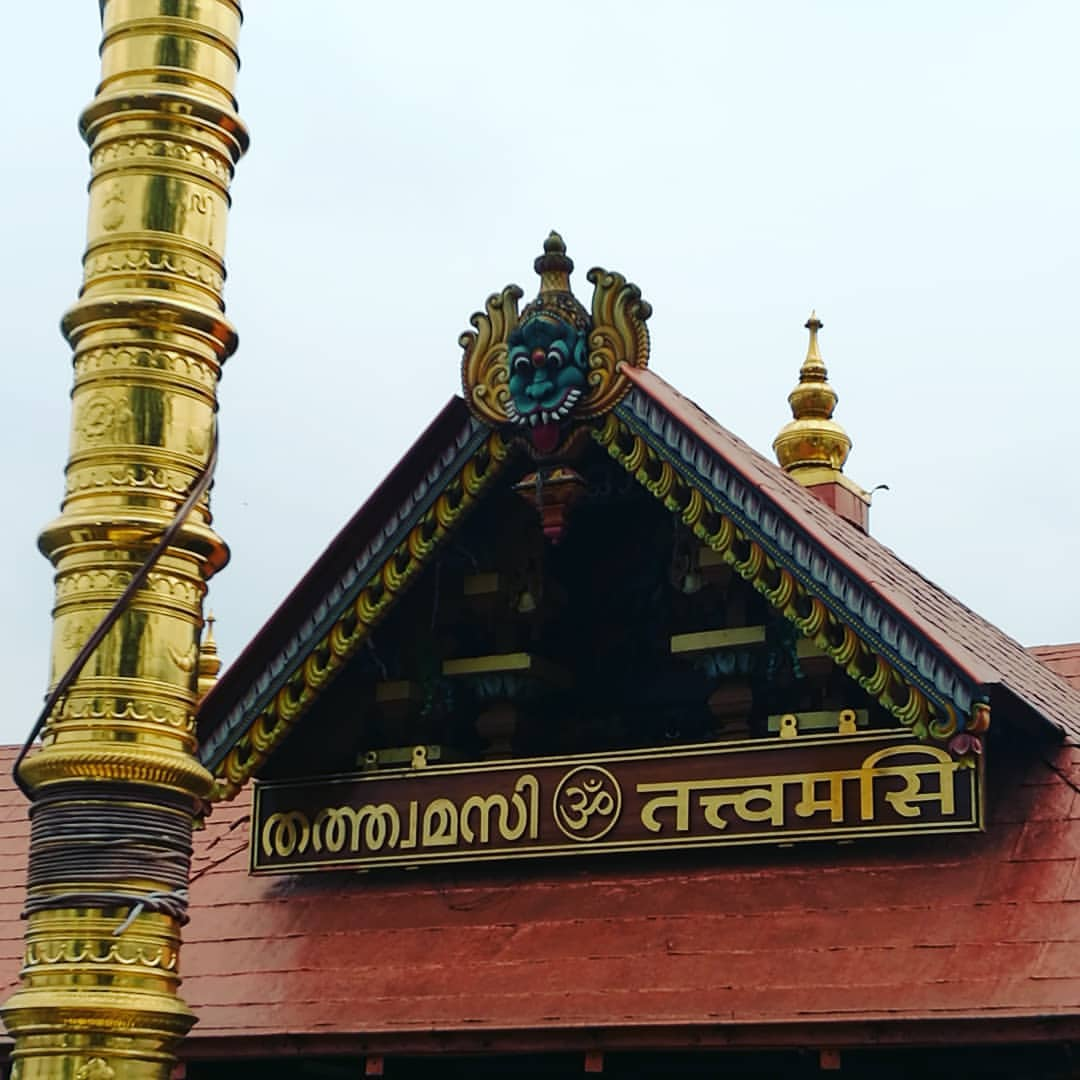
The phrase "Tat Tvam Asi" in the Malayalam and Devanagari scripts, displayed outside the sanctum sanctorum of the Sabarimala Temple in Kerala, India. The sacred syllable "Om" is the glyph in the middle.

Chandogya Upanishad 6.8.7, in the dialogue between Uddalaka and his son Śvetaketu. It appears at the end of a section, and is repeated at the end of the subsequent sections as a refrain:

[6.2.1] In the beginning, son, this world was simply what is existent - one only, without a second. [6.2.3] And it thought to itself: "let me become many. Let me propagate myself." [6.8.3] It cannot be without a root [6.8.4] [l]ook to the existent as the root. The existent, my son, is the root of all these creatures - the existent is their resting place, the existent is their foundation[7] The finest essence here—that constitutes the self of this whole world; that is the truth; that is the self (ātman). And that's how you are, Śvetaketu.

In ChU.6.8.12 it appears as follows:

'Bring a banyan fruit.'

'Here it is, sir.'
'Cut it up.'
'I've cut it up, sir.'
'What do you see here?'
'These quite tiny seeds, sir.'
'Now, take one of them and cut it up.'
'I've cut it up, sir.'
'What do you see there?'
'Nothing, sir.'
Then he told him: 'This finest essence here, son, that you can't even see—look how on account of that finest essence this huge banyan tree stands here.

'Believe, my son: the finest essence here—that constitutes the self of this whole world; that is the truth; that is the self (ātman). And that's how you are, Śvetaketu.'

=== Etymology and translation ===
Tat Tvam Asi (Devanagari: तत्त्वमसि, Vedic: tát tvam ási) is traditionally translated as "Thou art that", "That thou art", "That art thou", "You are that", "That you are", or "You're it"; although according to Brereton and others the proper translation would be "In that way [=thus] are you, Svetaketu", or "that's how you are":

- tat - "it", "that"; or alternatively "thus", "in that way", "that's how". From tat an absolutive derivation can be formed with the suffix -tva: tattva, 'thatness', 'principle', 'reality' or 'truth'; compare tathātā, "suchness", a similar absolutive derivation from tathā - 'thus', 'so', 'such', only with the suffix -tā, not -tva.
- tvam - you, thou
- asi - are, 'art'

In Ch.U.6.8.7 tat refers to Sat, "the Existent", Existence, Being. Sat, "the Existent", then is the true essence or root or origin of everything that exists, and the essence, Atman, which the individual at the core is. As Shankara states in the Upadesasahasri:

Up.I.174: "Through such sentences as 'Thou art That' one knows one's own Atman, the Witness of all the internal organs." Up.I.18.190: "Through such sentences as "[Thou art] the Existent" [...] right knowledge concerning the inner Atman will become clearer." Up.I.18.193-194: "In the sentence "Thou art That" [...] [t]he word 'That' means inner Atman."

While the Vedanta tradition equates sat ("the Existent") with Brahman, as stated in the Brahma Sutras, the Chandogya Upanishad itself does not refer to Brahman. (Note: Deutsch & Dalvi (2004, p. 8): "Although the text does not use the term brahman, the Vedanta tradition is that the Existent (sat) referred to is no other than Brahman.")

According to Brereton, followed by Patrick Olivelle and Wendy Doniger, (Note: Doniger (2010, p. 711): "Joel Brereton and Patrick Olivelle have argued, fairly convincingly, that it should rather be translated, 'And that's how you are.{'}") the traditional translation as "you are that" is incorrect, and should be translated as "In that way [=thus] are you, Svetaketu." (Note: As Brian Black explains: "the pronoun tat (that) is neuter, and therefor cannot correspond with the masculine tvam (you). Thus [...] if "you are that" was the intended meaning, then the passage should read sa tvam asi." Brereton concludes that tat tvam asi is better rendered as "in that way you are". According to Brereton, the "That you are" refrain originally belonged to Ch.U.6.12, from where it was duplicated to other verses.) That, then, in ChU.6.8.12 refers to "the very nature of all existence as permeated by [the finest essence]", and which is also the nature of Svetaketu. (Note: Brereton (1986, p. 109) "First, the passage establishes that the tree grows and lives because of an invisible essence. Then, in the refrain, it says that everything, the whole world, exists by means of such an essence. This essence is the truth, for it is lasting and real. It is the self, for everything exists by reference to it. Then and finally, Uddalaka personalizes the teaching. Svetaketu should look upon himself in the same way. He, like the tree and the whole world, is pervaded by this essence, which is his final reality and his true self.) Lipner expresses reservations on Brereton's interpretation, stating that it is technically plausible, but noting that "Brereton concedes that the philosophical import of the passage may be represented by the translation 'That you are', where tat as 'that' would refer to the supreme Being (sat/satya)."

=== Interpretation ===
Major Vedantic schools offer different interpretations of the phrase:

- Advaita - absolute equality of 'tat', the Ultimate Reality, Brahman, and 'tvam', the Self, Atman.
- Shuddhadvaita - oneness in "essence" between 'tat' and individual self; but 'tat' is the whole and self is a part.
- Vishishtadvaita -'tvam' denotes the Jiva-antaryami Brahman while 'tat' refers to Jagat-Karana Brahman.
- Dvaitadvaita - equal non-difference and difference between the individual self as a part of the whole which is 'tat'.
- Dvaita of Madhvacharya - tat tvam asi is read as atat tvam asi, meaning "that (parama) Aatma is the essence of all, you are not Him," or "Atma (Self), thou art, thou art not God." (Note: For the Dvaita Vedanta school of Madhva, the term Mahāvākyas is misplaced, as all statements in the Vedas are equally important, declaring the difference between atman and Brahman. According to Pandurangi, based on sandhi rules, स आत्माऽतत्त्वमसि could be split as 'Atat Tvam Asi' (Sanskrit: स आत्मा अतत्त्वम् असि) - meaning "that (parama) Aatma is the essence of all, you are not Him." It can also be translated as "Atma (Self), thou art, thou art not God." In refutation of Mayavada (Mayavada sata dushani), text 6, tat tvam asi is translated as "you are a servant of the Supreme (Vishnu).")
- Acintya Bheda Abheda - inconceivable oneness and difference between individual self as a part of the whole which is 'tat'.

== Aham Brahma Asmi ==
Aham Brahmāsmi (Devanagari: अहम् ब्रह्मास्मि), "I am Brahman" is in the Brihadaranyaka Upanishad 1.4.10 of the Shukla Yajurveda:

[1.4.1] In the beginning this world was just a single body (ātman) shaped like a man. He looked around and saw nothing but himself. The first thing he said was, 'Here I am!' and from that the name 'I' came into being. [1.4.9] Now, the question is raised; 'Since people think that they will become the Whole by knowing brahman, what did brahman know that enabled it to become the Whole? [1.4.10] In the beginning this world was only brahman, and it knew only itself (ātman), thinking: 'I am brahman.' As a result, it became the Whole [...] If a man knows 'I am brahman' in this way, he becomes the whole world. Not even the gods are able to prevent it, for he becomes their very self (ātman). (Note: "ब्रह्म वा इदमग्र आसीत्, तदात्मनामेवावेत्, अहम् ब्रह्मास्मीति)

Aham Brahmasmi is the core philosophy in advaita vedanta, indicating absolute oneness of atman with brahman.

=== Etymology ===
- Aham (अहम्) - literally "I".
- Brahma (ब्रह्म) - ever-full or whole (ब्रह्म is the first case ending singular of Brahman).
- Asmi (अस्मि) - "am," the first-person singular present tense of the verb as (अस्), "to be".

Ahaṁ Brahmāsmi then means "I am the Absolute" or "My identity is cosmic", but can also be translated as "you are part of god just like any other element".

=== Interpretations ===
In his comment on this passage, Sankara explains that here Brahman is not the conditioned Brahman (saguna); that a transitory entity cannot be eternal; that knowledge about Brahman, the infinite all-pervading entity, has been enjoined; that knowledge of non-duality alone dispels ignorance; and that the meditation based on resemblance is only an idea. He also tells us that the expression Aham Brahmaasmi is the explanation of the mantra

That ('Brahman') is infinite, and this ('universe') is infinite; the infinite proceeds from the infinite. (Then) taking the infinitude of the infinite ('universe'), it remains as the infinite ('Brahman') alone. - (Brihadaranyaka Upanishad V.i.1) (Note: पूर्णमदः पूर्णमिदं पूर्णात्पूर्णमुदच्यते)

He explains that non-duality and plurality are contradictory only when applied to the Self, which is eternal and without parts, but not to the effects, which have parts. The aham in this memorable expression is not closed in itself as a pure mental abstraction but it is radical openness. Between Brahman and aham-brahma lies the entire temporal universe experienced by the ignorant as a separate entity (duality).

Vidyāranya in his Panchadasi (V.4) explains:

Infinite by nature, the Supreme Self is described here by the word Brahman (lit. ever expanding; the ultimate reality); the word asmi denotes the identity of aham and Brahman. Therefore, (the meaning of the expression is) "I am Brahman". (Note: स्वतः पूर्णः परात्माऽत्र ब्रह्मशब्देन वर्णितः) Vaishnavas, when they talk about Brahman, usually refer to impersonal Brahman, brahmajyoti (rays of Brahman). 'Brahman' according to them means God—Narayana, Rama or Krishna. Thus, the meaning of aham brahma asmi according to their philosophy is that "I am a drop of Ocean of Consciousness", or "I am Self, part of cosmic spirit, Parabrahma". Here, the term 'Parabrahma' is introduced to avoid confusion. If Brahman can mean Self (though, Parabrahma is also the Self, but Supreme one—Paramatma), then Parabrahma should refer to God, Lord Vishnu.

== Prajñānam Brahma ==
Aitareya Upanishad 3.3 of the Rigveda, translation Olivelle:

[1] Who is this self (ātman)? - that is how we venerate. [2] Which of these is the self? Is it that by which one sees? Or hears? Smells [etc...] But these are various designations of cognition. [3] It is brahman; it is Indra; it is all the gods. It is [...] earth, wind, space, the waters, and the lights [...] It is everything that has life [...] Knowledge is the eye of all that, and on knowledge it is founded. Knowledge is the eye of the world, and knowledge, the foundation. Brahman is knowing.

=== Translation ===
Several translations, and word-orders of these translations, are possible:

Prajñānam:

- jñāna means "understanding", "knowledge", and sometimes "consciousness"
- Pra is a prefix which could be translated as "higher", "greater", "supreme" or "premium", or "being born or springing up", referring to a spontaneous type of knowing. (Note: Compare Radhakrishnan's notion of "intuition". (Note: Internet Encyclopedia of Philosophy, Sarvepalli Radhakrishnan (1888—1975)) (Note: Ashok Vora, Radhakrishna's notion of intuitive knowledge: a critique) (Note: [DR. SIR S. RADHAKRISHNAN, Intellect and Intuition in Sankara's Philosophy]))

Prajñānam as a whole means:

- प्रज्ञान, "prajñāna", (Note: Sanskrit Dictionary, prajnanam)
  - Adjective: prudent, easily known, wise
  - Noun: discrimination, knowledge, wisdom, intelligence. Also: distinctive mark, monument, token of recognition, any mark or sign or characteristic, memorial
- "Consciousness"
- "Intelligence"
- "Wisdom"

Related terms are jñāna, prajñā and prajñam, "pure consciousness". Although the common translation of jñānam is "consciousness", the term has a broader meaning of "knowing"; "becoming acquainted with", (Note: Sanskrit Dictionary, jnanam) "knowledge about anything", "awareness", "higher knowledge".

Brahman:

- "The Absolute"
- "Infinite"
- "The Highest truth"

Meaning: Most interpretations state: "Prajñānam (noun) is Brahman (adjective)". Some translations give a reverse order, stating "Brahman is Prajñānam", specifically "Brahman (noun) is Prajñānam (adjective)": "The Ultimate Reality is wisdom (or consciousness)". Sahu explains:

Prajnanam iti Brahman - wisdom is the Self. Prajnanam refers to the intuitive truth which can be verified/tested by reason. It is a higher function of the intellect that ascertains the Sat or Truth/Existent in the Sat-Chit-Ananda or truth/existent-consciousness-bliss, i.e. the Brahman/Atman/Self/person [...] A truly wise person [...] is known as Prajna - who has attained Brahmanhood itself; thus, testifying to the Vedic Maha Vakya (great saying or words of wisdom): Prajnanam iti Brahman.

And according to David Loy,

The knowledge of Brahman [...] is not intuition of Brahman but itself is Brahman.

== Ayam Ātmā Brahma ==
Ayam Atma Brahma (Sanskrit: अयम् आत्मा ब्रह्म) is a Mahāvākya which is found in 1-2 of the Mandukya Upanishad of the Atharvaveda:

[1] OM - this whole world is that syllable! Here is a further explanation of it. The past, the present and the future - all that is simply OM; and whatever else that is beyond the three times, that also is simply OM - [2] for this brahman is the Whole. Brahman is this self (ātman); that [brahman] is this self (ātman) consisting of four quarters.

In Sanskrit:

सर्वं ह्येतद् ब्रह्मायमात्मा ब्रह्म सोऽयमात्मा चतुष्पात् ॥ २ ॥
sarvaṁ hy etad brahmāyam ātmā brahma so'yam ātmā catuṣpāt

=== Translation ===
- sarvam etad - everything here, the Whole, all this
- hi - certainly
- brahma - Brahman
- ayam - this (Note: Sanskrit Dictionary, ayam)
- ātmā - Atman, self, essence
- brahma - Brahman
- so 'yam ātmā - "this very atman"
- catuṣpāt - "has four aspects"

While translations tend to separate the sentence in separate parts, Olivelle's translation uses various words in adjunct sets of meaning:

- सर्वं ह्येतद् ब्रह्म sarvam hyetad brahma - "this brahman is the Whole"
- ब्रह्मायमात्मा brahma ayam atma - "brahman is ātman"
- ब्रह्म सोऽयमात्मा brahman sah ayam atman - "brahman is this (very) self"

=== Contextualisation ===
The Mundaka Upanishad, in the first section of the second Mundaka, defines and explains the Atma-Brahma doctrine. It claims that just as a burning fire produces thousands of sparks and leaps and bounds in its own form, so the living beings originate from Brahman in its own form. Brahman is immortal, except the body, it is both external and internal, ever generated, except the mind, except the breath, yet from it emerges the inner soul of all things.

From Brahman breath, mind, senses, space, air, light, water, earth, everything is born. The section expands on this concept as follows,

The sky is his head, his eyes the sun and the moon,
the quarters his ears, his speech the Vedas disclosed,
the wind his breath, his heart the universe,
from his feet came the earth, he is indeed the inner Self of all things.

From him comes fire, the sun being the fuel,
from the soma comes the rain, from the earth the herbs,
the male pours the seed into the female,
thus many beings are begotten from the Purusha.

From him come the Rig verses, the Saman chants, the Yajus formulae, the Diksha rites,
all sacrifices, all ceremonies and all gifts,
the year too, the sacrificers, the worlds,
where the moon shines brightly, as does sun.

From him, too, gods are manifold produced,
the celestials, the men, the cattle, the birds,
the breathing, the rice, the corn, the meditation,
the Shraddha (faith), the Satya (truth), the Brahmacharya, and the Vidhi (law).

— Mundaka Upanishad, 2.1.4 - 2.1.7

The Mundaka Upanishad verse 2.2.2 claims that Atman-Brahman is real. Verse 2.2.3 offers help in the process of meditation, such as Om. Verse 2.2.8 claims that the one who possesses self-knowledge and has become one with Brahman is free, not affected by Karma, free from sorrow and Atma-doubt, he who is happy. The section expands on this concept as follows,

That which is flaming, which is subtler than the subtle,
on which the worlds are set, and their inhabitants -
That is the indestructible Brahman.
It is life, it is speech, it is mind. That is the real. It is immortal.
It is a mark to be penetrated. Penetrate It, my friend.

Taking as a bow the great weapon of the Upanishad,
one should put upon it an arrow sharpened by meditation,
Stretching it with a thought directed to the essence of That,
Penetrate that Imperishable as the mark, my friend.

Om is the bow, the arrow is the Self, Brahman the mark,
By the undistracted man is It to be penetrated,
One should come to be in It,
as the arrow becomes one with the mark.

— Mundaka Upanishad, 2.2.2 - 2.2.4

The Mandukya Upanishad repeatedly states that Om is ātman, and also states that turiya is ātman. The Mandukya Upanishad forms the basis of Gaudapada's Advaita Vedanta, in his Mandukya Karika.

According to the Guru Gita, "Ayam Atma Brahma" is a statement of practice.

== Sarvaṃ Khalvidaṃ Brahma ==
सर्वं खल्विदं ब्रह्म तज्जलानिति शान्त उपासीत । अथ खलु क्रतुमयः पुरुषो यथाक्रतुरस्मिँल्लोके पुरुषो भवति तथेतः प्रेत्य भवति स क्रतुं कुर्वीत ॥ ३.१४.१ ॥

sarvaṃ khalvidaṃ brahma tajjalāniti śānta upāsīta | atha khalu kratumayaḥ puruṣo yathākraturasmim̐lloke puruṣo bhavati tathetaḥ pretya bhavati sa kratuṃ kurvīta || 3.14.1 ||

1. All this is Brahman. Everything comes from Brahman, everything goes back to Brahman, and everything is sustained by Brahman. One should therefore quietly meditate on Brahman. Each person has a mind of his own. What a person wills in his present life, he becomes when he leaves this world. One should bear this in mind and meditate accordingly.

=== Interlinear gloss ===
Sarvam idam, all this; khalu; no doubt; brahma, is Brahman; tajjalān, from this everything comes, into this everything disappears, and on this everything is sustained; iti śāntaḥ upāsīta, meditate on this fact quietly; atha khalu kratumayaḥ puruṣaḥ, because each person has a mind of his own; asmin loke, [therefore] in his present life; yathā kratuḥ puruṣaḥ bhavati, just as a person wills; itaḥ pretya tathā bhavati, he becomes that when he leaves this world; saḥ kratum kurvīta, [therefore] he should be careful about what he wants.

=== Commentary ===
The word brahman means ‘the oldest,’ ‘the biggest.’ Tejas (fire), jala (water), and pṛthivī (earth) emerged from Brahman in that order, so they are called tajja. Then they disappear in Brahman in the reverse order, so they are called talla. In the past, in the present, and in the future—they are sustained in Brahman. They are, therefore, one with Brahman. The Upaniṣad says here to think over this with kratu—that is, with great effort, and with deep concentration.

Kratu also means will, or will power. It is your will that decides your destiny. Śrī Kṛṣṇa said to Arjuna (Bhagavad Gītā 8.6): ‘O son of Kunti, at the time of death when a person leaves the body, he attains whatever object he thinks of, as he has been [previously] constantly absorbed in its thought.’ This shows the importance of your kratu.

== Other Mahavakyas ==
Other Mahavakyas are:

- ekam evadvitiyam brahma एकं एव अद्वितीयं ब्रह्म ! - Brahman is one, without a second (Chāndogya Upaniṣad)
- so 'ham सोऽहं ! - I am that (Isha Upanishad)
- etad vai tat एतद् वै तत् ! - This, verily, is That (Katha Upanishad)

== See also ==
- Advaita Vedanta
- Jiva
- Monism
- Soham (Sanskrit)
- Vakya Vritti
- Ajativada
- I Am that I Am
- Al-Hallaj

== Sources ==
=== Printed sources ===
- Bhatawadekar, Sai (2013), "The Tvat Tam Asi Formula and Schopenhauer's "Deductive Leap"", in Fuechtner, Veronika; Rhiel, Mary (eds.), Imagining Germany Imagining Asia: Essays in Asian-German Studies, Boydell & Brewer
- Black, Brian (2012), The Character of the Self in Ancient India: Priests, Kings, and Women in the Early Upanisads, SUNY, ISBN 9780791480526
- Braue, Donald A. (1984), Māyā in Radhakrishnanʾs Thought: Six Meanings Other Than Illusion, Motilall Banarsidass
- Brereton, Joel P. (1986), ""Tat Tvam Ast" in Context", Zeitschrift der Deutschen Morgenländischen Gesellschaft, 136 (1): 98–109
- Deutsch, Eliot; Dalvi, Rohit, eds. (2004), The Essential Vedanta. A New Source Book of Advaita vedamta, World Wisdom
- Doniger, Wendy (2010), The Hindus: An Alternative History, Viking Penguin
- D'Souza, Ivan (2021). A Hermeneutical Investigation of Super-Primary Meaning in the Dvaita Vedānta of Madhva. Cambridge Scholars Publishing.
- Grimes, John A. (1996), A Concise Dictionary of Indian Philosophy: Sanskrit Terms Defined in English, SUNY Press
- Lipner, Julius J. (2000), "The Self of Being and the Being of Self: Samkara on "That you Are" (tat tvam asi)", in De Smet, Richard V.; Malkovsky, Bradley J. (eds.), New Perspectives on Advaita Vedānta: Essays in Commemoration of Professor Richard De Smet, S.J., BRILL
- Loy, David (1997), Nonduality. A Study in Comparative Philosophy, Humanity Books
- Mayeda, Sengaku (1992), "An Introduction to the Life and Thought of Sankara", in Mayeda, Sengaku (ed.), A Thousand Teachings: The Upadeśasāhasrī of Śaṅkara, State University of New York City Press, ISBN 0-7914-0944-9
- Olivelle, Patrick (2008) [1996], Upanisads. A new translation by Patrick Olivelle, Oxford University Press
- Raṅganāthānanda, Swami (1991), Nelson, Elva Linnéa (ed.), Human Being in Depth: A Scientific Approach to Religion, SUNY Press
- Raphael, Edwin (1992), The pathway of non-duality, Advaitavada: an approach to some key-points of Gaudapada's Asparśavāda and Śaṁkara's Advaita Vedanta by means of a series of questions answered by an Asparśin, Motilall Banarsidas, ISBN 81-208-0929-7
- Sahu, Bhagirathi (2004), The New Educational Philosophy, Sarup & Sons
- Saraswati, Chandrasekharendra (1995), Hindu Dharma: The Universal Way of Life, Bhavan's Book University, ISBN 81-7276-055-8
- Sivaraman, K. (1973), Śaivism in Philosophical Perspective: A Study of the Formative Concepts, Problems, and Methods of Śaiva Siddhānta, Motilall Banarsidass
- Waite, Dennis (2015), A-U-M: Awakening to Reality, John Hunt Publishing
