= Gaudapada =

Medieval era Hindu philosopher and scholar

Gauḍapāda
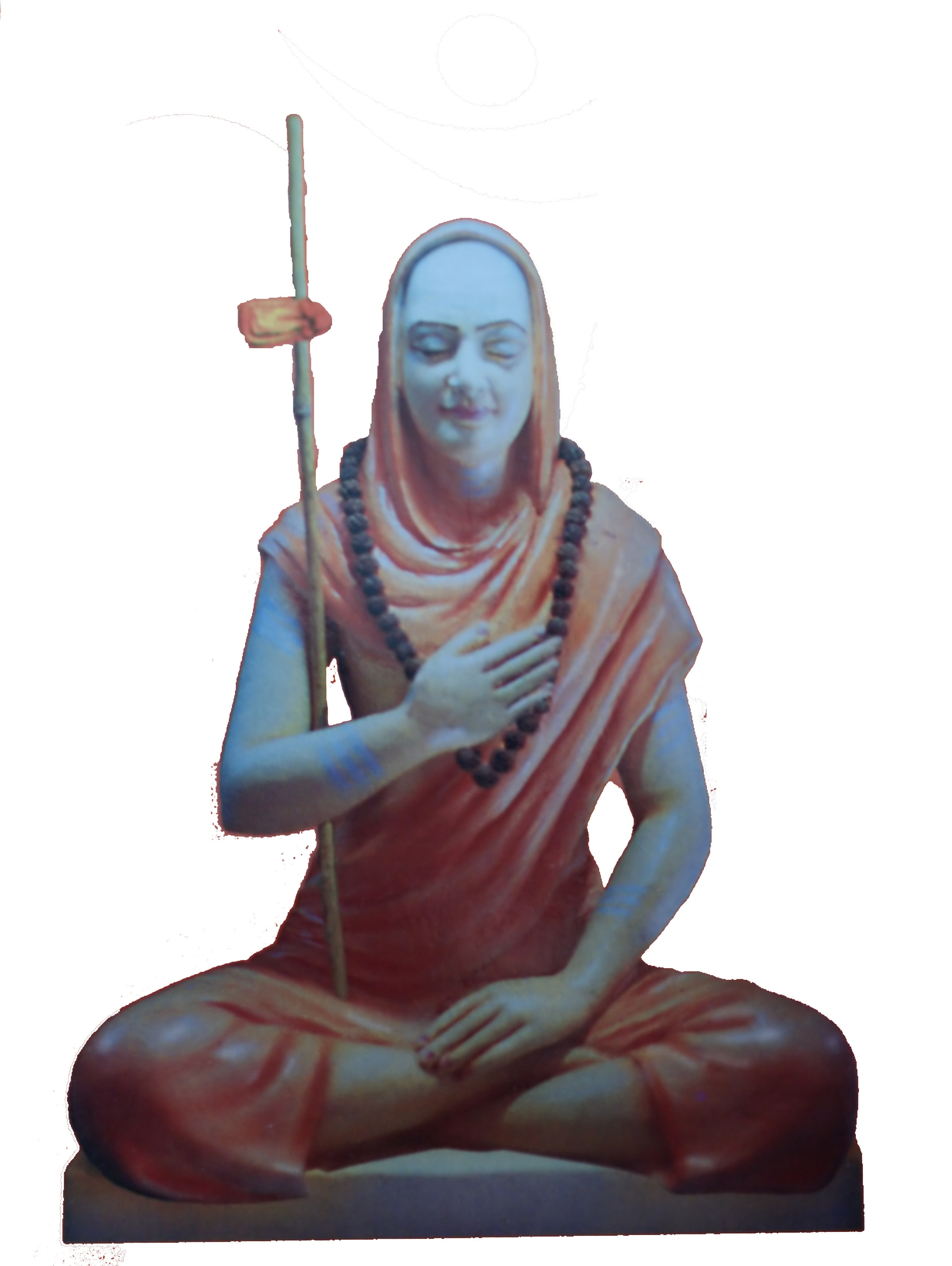
- Adi Guru Shri Gauḍapādāchārya

Religious life
- Religion: Hinduism
- Founder of: Shri Gaudapadacharya Math
- Philosophy: Advaita Vedanta

Gauḍapāda (Sanskrit: गौडपाद; fl.c. 6th century CE), also referred as Gauḍapādācārya (Sanskrit: गौडपादाचार्य; "Gauḍapāda the Teacher"), was an early medieval era Hindu philosopher and scholar of the Advaita Vedanta school of Hindu philosophy. While details of his biography are uncertain, his ideas inspired others such as Adi Shankara who called him a Paramaguru (highest teacher).

Gaudapada was the author or compiler of the Māṇḍūkya Kārikā, also known as Gaudapada Karika. The text consists of four chapters (also called four books), of which Chapter Four uses Buddhist terminology thereby showing it was influenced by Buddhism. However, doctrinally Gaudapada's work is Vedantic, and not Buddhist. The first three chapters of Gaudapada's text have been influential in the Advaita Vedanta tradition. Parts of the first chapter that include the Mandukya Upanishad have been considered a valid scriptural source by the Dvaita and Vishistadvaita schools of Vedanta.

== Dates ==
The century in which Gaudapada lived and his life details are uncertain. Estimates vary from early 6th to 7th century CE. He is generally dated based on estimates for Adi Shankara, whose teacher Govinda Bhagavatpada is presumed to be the direct disciple of Gaudapada. Shankara, in some texts, refers to Gaudapada as the "teacher's teacher" who knows the tradition of the Vedānta (sampradāya-vit). Assuming how long each lived and when, Gaudapada is estimated to have lived sometime in the 7th century CE. Alternatively, states Potter, the phrase "teacher's teacher" should not be taken literally, and more in the sense of another phrase he uses for Gaudapada, namely Paramaguru (highest teacher). According to Michael Comans, Gaudapada may have been the guru of Sankara's teacher but was perhaps a more distant guru (aka Vasudevacharya) due to the number of times he references the Gauḍapada kārikās.

Another estimate places him around the early 6th century. This estimate is based on Buddhist literature, and particularly the works of scholars Bhavaviveka, Santaraksita and Kamalasila, who cite Gauḍapada kārikās. Bhavaviveka was a contemporary of Dharmapala, states Karl Potter, while Chinese texts and travel accounts place Dharmapala in the mid 6th century CE. Assuming the Buddhist and Chinese records are reliable, and for Bhavaviveka to have quoted Gauḍapada kārikās, Gaudapada must have lived around 500 CE, or sometime in the first half of 6th century CE. But, it is certain that Gaudapada lived after the 4th century because he cites some Buddhist views of Nāgārjuna and Asanga, the latter of whom various accounts place in 4th century.

== Mandukya Karika ==
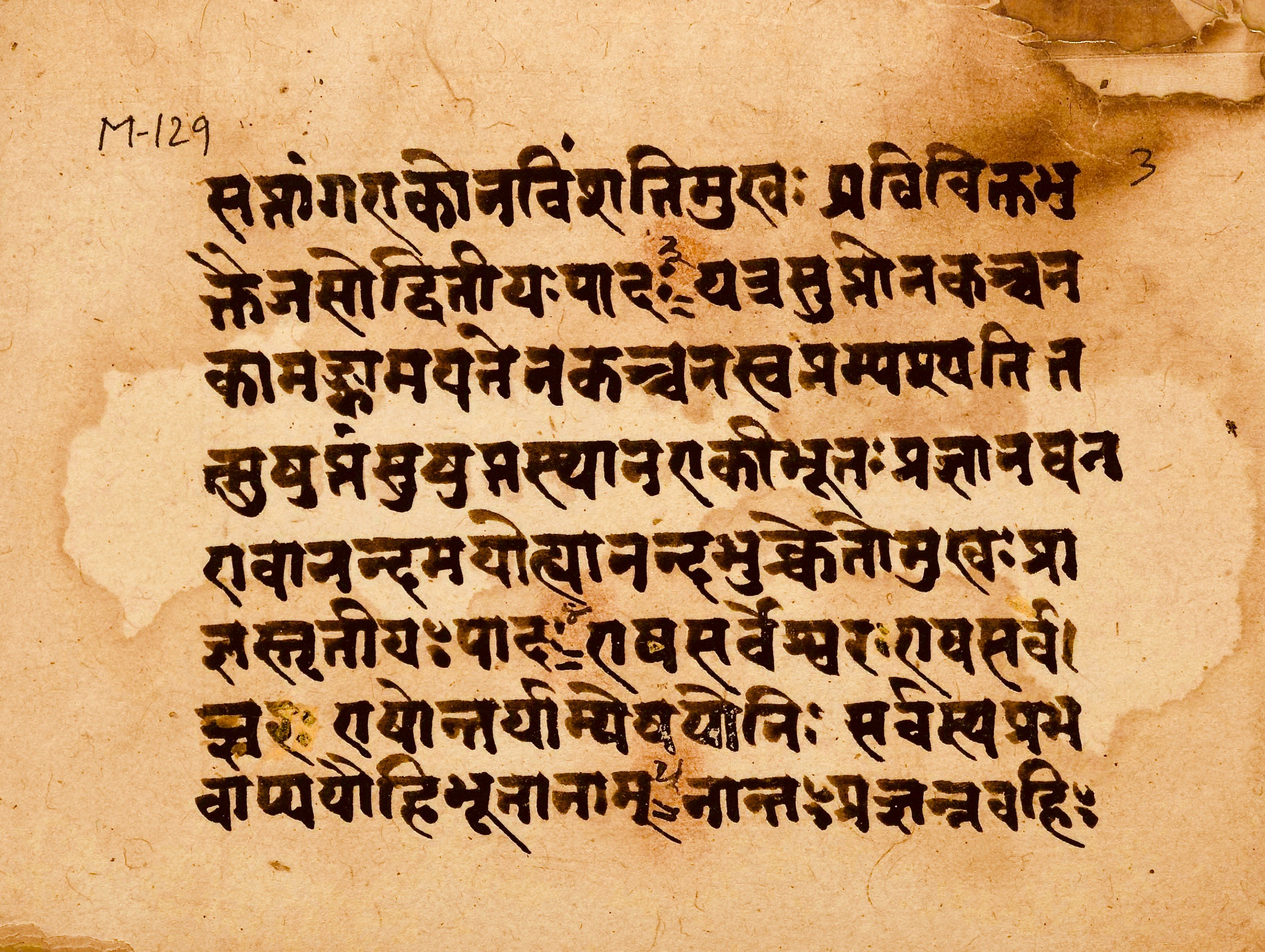
The Mandukya Karika is an influential Vedanta text. Above: a manuscript page (Sanskrit, Devanagari script)

=== Authorship ===
Gaudapada wrote or compiled the Māṇḍukya Kārikā, also known as the Gauḍapāda Kārikā or the Āgama Śāstra. (Note: Nakamura notes that there are contradictions in doctrine between the four chapters.) Karl Potter notes that some scholars doubt whether the Gaudapāda Kārikā was written by one author, but others note that Shankara's commentary on Chandogya Upanishad clearly indicates it was written by one author.

The Māṇḍukya Kārikā is a concise explanation, in verse form, (Note: Karika is defined by Monier-Williams as "concise statement in verse of (esp. philosophy and grammar) doctrines" in the Indian traditions.) of the Mandukya Upanishad, one of the shortest but a profound Upanishad, consisting of just 12 sentences. Even before the time of Adi Shankara, Mandukya Upanishad was considered to be a Śruti, but not one particularly important during his era. In later periods, it gained notability as expressing the Upanishadic essence. The Karika, notably, presents rational arguments from dream states, infinitude and finitude, space and time, causality, disintegration, and generation in support of the Advaita doctrine.

According to Sarma, the Māṇḍukya Kārikā is the earliest extant systematic treatise on Advaita Vedānta, though it is not the oldest work to present Advaita views, nor the only pre-Sankara work with the same type of teachings. According to Hajime Nakamura, not only was the Gaudapada Karika treasured in the Advaita tradition, the text was also revered and highly respected in Vishistadvaita and Dvaita Vedanta schools of Hinduism. Gaudapada's text, adds Nakamura, was treasured but not considered a Sruti by Advaita scholars, while Ramanuja and Madhvacharya of non-Advaita schools considered its first chapter to be a Sruti.

=== Contents ===
The Gaudapadiya Karika has 215 metered verses which are divided into four chapters:

1. Chapter One (29 verses) — Agama, or Agama Prakarana (Traditional doctrine, includes 12 verses of the Mandukya Upanishad)
2. Chapter Two (38 verses) — Vaitathya Prakarana (Unreality)
3. Chapter Three (48 verses) — Advaita Prakarana (Nonduality)
4. Chapter Four (100 verses) — Alatasanti Prakarana (The Peace of the Firebrand)

Chronologically, according to Hajime Nakamura, the Buddhist texts that quote from Gaudapada Karikas imply that the Vedantic ideas in the first three chapters are of greater antiquity. Nakamura states that most of Chapter Three of the Gaudapada Karika was complete by 400–500 CE. He estimates that most of Chapter One was complete by 300–400 CE, while Chapter Two, which presupposes Chapter One, can be dated after Chapter One but before Chapter Three. Most of the Chapter Four was written sometime between 400 and 600 CE.

==== Chapter One: Traditional Doctrine (Agama) ====
Om is bliss

Om is Brahman,
both the higher and lower,
as well as Ishvara residing in the hearts of everyone,
it is both without measure and of unlimited measure,
the cessation of duality,
it is bliss.

— Gaudapada Karika 1.28–29
Translator: Karl Potter

The Self resides in one's body in three forms: waking state, sleeping dreamy state and deep sleep state, according to Potter's translation. In the awake state, the Self experiences the Vishva – the external objects and the visible; in the dream state, it experiences the Taijasa – the internal mind objects and dream appearances; and in deep sleep, it experiences Prajna – the unpolarised, the fruits of the heart and bliss. Arvind Sharma notes that the description of these states of self are similar to those found in Brihadaranyaka Upanishad and other ancient Hindu texts.

In Karikas 1.6-1.9, Gaudapada presents the competing traditional theories about life in vogue, before and in his times. Some claim that creation is the result of the expansion of the Self, some claim it is a mere magic show, some claim the creation is from God's desire, some claim Kala (time) creates all beings. In Karika 1.10, the text states there is a fourth state of the Self, called Turiya, one of Advaita (nonduality), all pervading, unchanging and without Dukkha (sorrow). This fourth state of Self in Gaudapada Karika is found in chapters 8.7 through 8.12 of Chandogya Upanishad, which discusses the "four states of consciousness" as awake, dream-filled sleep, deep sleep, and beyond deep sleep.

According to Gaudapada, the Vishva and Taijasa state of Self can be a source of cause and effect, the Prajna state is only cause, while Turiya state is neither. In the Prajna state, consciousness lies dormant like a seed, whereas in the Turiya it is fully awake and always seeing. It is the waking state and dream state that lead to awareness, errors and unawareness. The perceived duality of the world is Maya, when in reality there is only nonduality. Karikas 1.19-1.29 identify Vishva, Taijasa, and Prajna with the syllables A, U, and M of Om, while Turiya, beyond all measure, transcends every state. Chapter One ends with the discussion of the syllable Om and its symbolism for Brahman and for the Atman within the heart of all living beings.

==== Chapter Two: Unreality (Vaitathya) ====
Unreal are the dream objects during sleep, states Gaudapada, because the one who dreams never actually goes to the places he dreams of, and because whatever situation he dreams about is something he leaves upon waking up. This is in the scripture Brihadaranyaka Upanishad.

In the same sense, Karikas 4-15 of Chapter Two state that the true reality is covered up for man even in his waking state, because, translates Potter, "any object nonexistent in the beginning and in the end is also nonexistent in the middle". Just as dream objects are found to be unreal upon waking, so too in the waking state, whatever we apprehend as real or unreal is unreal. But this assertion leads to the obvious question, states Gaudapada, that if both internal and external are not true reality, who is it that imagines, who apprehends them and who cognises? Gaudapada submits his answer as the Atman (Self, soul).

Gaudapada Karika states that while we do grasp objects, we perceive, we think, but this does not connote the nature of reality and unreality, just like our fear of "a rope for a serpent in darkness". We construct realities, states Gaudapada, and imagine Jivatman to be various things such as praana (breath), loka (world), deva (gods), bhoktr (enjoyer), bhojya (enjoyables), sukshma (subtle), sthula (gross), murta (material), amurta (nonmaterial) and so on.

We imagine things in our mind, we create things in our mind, we destroy things in our mind, says Gaudapada; yet all these things are not different from It, the atman (gender neutral). All such constructions create dualities in our imagination, are maya. The true reality, state Karikas 33–36, is nondual and it is atman. Those who have mastered and grown past all attachments, past all fear and past all anger, they are past all dualities, know their Self, have secured the nonduality within. According to Karikas 36–38, such wise individuals, do not care about praise from anyone, are beyond all rituals, are homeless wanderers, for they have realised the truth inside them and outside; they, translates Potter, "remain steadfastly true to nature".

==== Chapter Three: Nonduality (Advaita) ====
Duties of worship

Duties of worship arise only for those
who think something is born
and who are thus miserable.
I shall therefore speak of the
nonmiserable state in which (...)

— Gaudapada Karika 3.1–2
Translator: Karl Potter

Gaudapada begins this chapter by criticising Upasana (worship), which assumes that the Brahman-Atman is unborn in the beginning and in the end, but is presently born (as jiva). He argues that the nondual Brahman-Atman (Self) can give rise to apparent duality (Jivas, individual souls), while remaining unaffected, like space within jars. Self is like space and the Jivas are like space in jars. Just as space is enclosed in a jar, so is the Self manifested as Jivas. When the jar is destroyed the space in the jar merges into space so likewise, are the Jivas one with the Self.

Gaudapada states that the Upanishads like the Brihadaranyaka Upanishad teach that one's Atman (self) is identical with the Atman in all beings and that all Atman are identical with Brahman. While some Upanishads, acknowledges Gaudapada, imply a difference between individual soul and the Brahman, those texts are discussing the apparent distinction (duality) when one believes in apparent creation. In reality, states Gaudapada, there is no creation of souls from Brahman as they are identical. We must not confuse passages meant for spiritual instruction. According to Karikas 3.17-18, Gaudapada admits that dualists disagree with this view, but the ancient texts admit duality in the context of appearances, while "nonduality is indeed the highest reality" as translated by Karmarkar.

According to Karl Potter's translation of Karikas 3.33-36, an awareness without conceptual construction is unborn, real, and is identical with Brahman. This awareness is beyond words and thought, shines forth without fear, calm and unwavering, equanimous, and full of light. It comes from self-reflection, understanding, detachment from dukkha (frustration) and sukha (pleasure), where the mind rests in indescribable calmness within. (Note: दुःखं सर्वमनुस्मृत्य कामभोगान्निवर्तयेत् । अजं सर्वमनुस्मृत्य जातं नैव तु पश्यति ॥ ४३ ॥(...) नाऽऽस्वादयेत्सुखं तत्र निःसङ्गः प्रज्ञया भवेत् । निश्चलं निश्चरच्चित्तमेकीकुर्यात्प्रयत्नतः ॥ ४५ ॥(...) स्वस्थं शान्तं सनिर्वाणमकथ्यं सुखमुत्तमम् । अजमजेन ज्ञेयेन सर्वज्ञं परिचक्षते ॥ ४७ ॥)

Karikas 3.39-46 describe Asparsa Yoga, through which this calmness is attained. In this practice of 'non-contact' (a-sparsa), the mind is controlled and brought to rest, and does not create "things" (appearances) after which it grasps; it becomes non-dual, free from the grasping subject-object dualism. Knowing that only Atman-Brahman is real, the creations of the mind are seen as illusory, and negated (MK 3.31-33). When the mind is brought to rest, it becomes or is Brahman (MK 3.46). According to Gaudapada, Asparsa Yoga is difficult for most, including the yogis, who see fear, namely a loss of atman, in what is fearlessly blissful. (Note: Adi Shankara interprets this Karika somewhat differently, according to Comans.)

==== Chapter Four: The Peace of The Firebrand (Alatasanti) ====
The last chapter of Gaudapada Karika has a different style than the first three, and it opens by revering "the greatest of men", who are like the cosmic space through their awareness of nonduality, free from self-contradictions and confusion, and who understand Dharma. Karikas 4.3–10 repeat some content from previous chapters, but with some word substitutions. Karikas 4.11–13 quote the key duality premise of Samkhya school of Hindu philosophy, cross examines it, then asks how and why is cause eternal? The text states that the Samkhya premise "cause is born as its effect" leads to infinite regress, which is not persuasive.

Gaudapada Karika then acknowledges the Ajativada (non-origination) theory of the Buddhists. Like Samkhya premise, the text praises and cross examines it, in three ways. First, the non-origination premises makes sense when neither the point of origin nor the end of something is known, but we know the point of origin of any example of something produced and therefore the Ajativada premise does not follow; secondly, the Ajativada premise commits the Sadhyasama fallacy of reasoning by offering examples of what is yet to be proved. Third, according to Karikas 4.29–41, neither samsara nor mukti has a beginning or end, because if something is born it must have an end, and something that is unborn has no end.

Karikas 4.45–52 state that only consciousness (Vijnana) is real, explaining this with an example of fire stick before and during the time it burns, and adding that we construct and deconstruct our state of awareness. Karikas 4.53–56 assert that there is no causation, no effects, and repeats that consciousness is the only real thing. Everything is impermanent, non-eternal, and without the origination by nature, state Karikas 4.57–60.

Karikas 4.61–81 repeat text on four states from earlier chapters to re-emphasise the premises about impermanence and non-origination. Attachment to unreality causes desire, sorrow (dukkha) and fear, while detachment leads to freeing from such states and to samadhi. Three stages of understanding are described in Karikas 4.87–89: Laukika (ordinary. which cognises object and subject as real), Shuddha laukika (purified ordinary, where perceiving is considered real but not the objects) and Lokottara (supramundane, where neither objects nor perceiving are cognised as real).

Karikas 4.90–100 presents Agrayana (vehicle to knowing). The text states, "all dharmas are without beginning, without variety, and are consciousness only". Duality is for the unwise, nonduality and undifferentiated Reality is for the wise, and difficult to grasp. The last Karikas of the Chapter Four add, as translated by Karl Potter, "this the Buddhas understand, the Buddha instructs us that consciousness does not reach the dharmas, yet the Buddha said nothing about either consciousness or dharmas!"

=== Gaudapada's Soteriology ===
According to Gaudapada, liberation is the realisation that the Self is the unborn and has never truly entered into bondage. He describes the liberated Self as "unborn" and "calm" and awareness in this state as "independent, calm" and "blissful, unborn, all-knowing". In the doctrine of Ajativada, he explains that what does not exist in the beginning or end cannot be real in the present and origination is impossible from being, non-being, both, or neither. He further states that bondage and liberation are only imagined states, and that bondage arises though mental projection (vikalpa). Liberation follows when both ignorance (sleep) and error (dream/waking) are transcended and the "fourth" state (turiya) is realised. Gaudapada separates liberation from waking, dreaming, and the non-awareness of deep sleep. Shankara interpreted these states as empirical and as stages through which self-knowledge is attained and liberation is realised through the removal of ignorance by knowledge.

=== Relationship to Buddhism ===
The influence of Buddhist doctrines on Gaudapada has been a vexed question, though "most recent writers seem to be willing to admit Buddhist influence," yet also note that Gaudapada was a Vedantin and not a Buddhist.

Gaudapada "took over" the Yogachara teaching of vijñapti-mātra, "representation-only," which states that the empirical reality that we experience is a fabrication of the mind, experienced by consciousness-an-sich, (Note: It is often used interchangeably with the term citta-mātra, but they have different meanings. The standard translation of both terms is "consciousness-only" or "mind-only." Several modern researchers object this translation, and the accompanying label of "absolute idealism" or "idealistic monism". A better translation for vijñapti-mātra is representation-only.) and the four-cornered negation, which negates any positive predicates of 'the Absolute'. (Note: 1. Something is. 2. It is not. 3. It both is and is not. 4. It neither is nor is not. The 'four-cornered negation' is an English gloss of the Sanskrit, Chatushkoti.) Gaudapada "wove [both doctrines] into the philosophy of Mandukaya Upanisad, which was further developed by Shankara". (Note: The influence of Mahayana Buddhism on other religions and philosophies was not limited to Vedanta. Kalupahana notes that the Visuddhimagga – a Theravada Buddhist tradition, contains "some metaphysical speculations, such as those of the Sarvastivadins, the Sautrantikas, and even the Yogacarins".) In this view,

the ultimate ontological reality is the pure consciousness, which is bereft of attributes and intentionality. The world of duality is nothing but a vibration of the mind (manodṛśya or manaspandita). The pluralistic world is imagined by the mind (saṁkalpa) and this false projection is sponsored by the illusory factor called māyā.

According to Bhattacharya, Asparsayoga also has Buddhist origins. In chapter Four, according to Bhattacharya, two karikas refer to the Buddha. According to Murti, "the conclusion is irresistible that Gaudapada, a Vedanta philosopher, is attempting an advaitic interpretation of Vedanta in the light of the Madhyamika and Yogcara doctrines. He even freely quotes and appeals to them."

However, adds Murti, the doctrines are unlike Buddhism. Chapter One, Two and Three are entirely Vedantin and founded on the Upanishads, with little Buddhist flavour. While the first three chapters discuss Brahman and Atman (soul, Self), Chapter Four doesn't. This, according to Murti, may be because this was authored by someone else and not Gaudapada, a position shared by Richard King. Further, state both Murti and King, no Vedanta scholars who followed Gaudapada ever quoted from Chapter Four, they only quote from the first three. According to Sarma, Chapter Four may well have been written by Gaudapada assuming he was fully conversant with Mahayana school's teachings, yet "to mistake him to be a hidden or open Buddhist is absurd". The doctrines of Gaudapada and Buddhism are totally opposed, states Murti:

We have been talking of borrowing, influence and relationship in rather general terms. It is necessary to define the possible nature of the borrowing, granting that it did take place. (...) The Vedantins stake everything on the Atman (Brahman) and accept the authority of the Upanishads. We have pointed out at length the Nairatmya standpoint of Buddhism and its total opposition to the Atman (soul, substance, the permanent and universal) in any form.

— TRV Murti, The Central Philosophy of Buddhism

Sengaku Mayeda states that "it might be Gaudapada the author of the Mandukyakarika, or his predecessors, and not Shankara who can be called a 'Buddhist in disguise'", and credits Shankara with "re-inject[ing] the upanishadic spirit into the extremely buddhisticized Mandukyakarika of his paramaguru, pouring new life into it as it were, giving it an interpretation that followed the line of Vedanta school and achieved the re-vedantinization of the buddhisticized vedantic tradition".

Swami Nikhilananda denies Buddhist influence, arguing that Gaudapada used Buddhist terminology because Buddhism was prevalent at that time, but he was ultimately an Advaita Vedantin and he disagrees with Gautama Buddha in the second last verse of the Alatasanti Prakarana in the Kārikā. Dasgupta explicitly states that Nikhilanda is incorrect in denying Buddhist influence, stating, in Sangharakshita's words, that "the influence of Buddhism on his thinking could not be denied."

== Other works by Gaudapadacharya ==
A number of additional works are attributed to Gaudapada, but their authenticity is uncertain. The attributed works are:

- A bhasya on Brihadaranyaka Upanishad
- A bhasya on Nrisimha Tapaniya Upanishad
- A bhasya on Anugita
- Durga Saptashati Tika — A bhasya on Devi Mahatmya
- Sri Vidyaratna Sutra bhasya
- Subhagodaya on Shri Vidya
- Uttara Gita Bhashya

Gaudapada is also credited with a commentary on Samkhyakarikas. According to Potter, the naive nature of this commentary is in sharp contrast to the depth of reflection in Gaudapada Karikas, and it is unlikely that the commentary on the Samkhyakarikas was written by Gaudapada.

== Advaita guru-paramparā ==
Gaudapada is one of the key persons in the Advaita Vedanta. He is traditionally said to have been highly influential on Adi Shankara, one of the most important figures in Vedic philosophy. Michael Comans suggests that by the number of references to Gaudapada in Shankara's commentary on the Brahmasutra, alone, is enough to demonstrate the influence of Gaudapada on Shankara's arguments.

== Shri Gaudapadacharya Math ==
Shri Gaudapadacharya Math (Note: Sanskrit: श्री संस्थान गौडपदाचार्य मठ, Śrī Sansthāna Gauḍapadācārya Maṭha), also known as Kavaḷē maṭha कवळे मठ, is the oldest matha of the Gaud Saraswat Brahmins.

The Peetadhipathi "head monk" is Śrī Gauḍapadācārya. Rajapur Saraswat Brahmins and Smartist Goud Saraswat Brahmins are its main disciples.

== See also ==
- Philosophy of experience (Hinduism)

List of Math

- Kavaḷē maṭha
- Kashi Math
- Gokarna Math
- Chitrapur Math

== Sources ==
- Michael Comans (2000). The Method of Early Advaita Vedānta: A Study of Gauḍapāda, Śaṅkara, Sureśvara, and Padmapāda. Motilal Banarsidass. ISBN 978-81-208-1722-7.
- Garfield, Jay L.; Priest, Graham (2003), Nagarjuna and the Limits of Thought, Philosophy East & West Volume 53, Number 1 January 2003 1–21 (PDF)
- Isaeva, Natalia V. (1995). From Early Vedanta to Kashmir Shaivism: Gaudapada, Bhartrhari, and Abhinavagupta. State University of New York Press. ISBN 978-0-7914-2449-0.
- Kalupahana, David J. (1994), A History of Buddhist Philosophy, Delhi: Motilal Banarsidass Publishers Private Limited
- Karmarkar, Raghunath Damodar (1953). Gaudapada-Karika [Sanskrit-English]. Bhandarkar Oriental Research Institute, Poona.
- Kochumuttom, Thomas A. (1999), A Buddhist Doctrine of Experience. A New Translation and Interpretation of the Works of Vasubandhu the Yogacarin, Delhi: Motilal Banarsidass
- Nakamura, Hajime (2004), A History of Early Vedanta Philosophy. Part Two, Delhi: Motilal Banarsidass Publishers Private Limited
- Potter, Karl. H. (1981), Gaudapada, Encyclopedia of Indian Philosophies: Advaita Vedānta up to Śaṃkara and his pupils, Volume 3, pp. 103-114, Delhi: Motilal Banarsidass, ISBN 81-208-0310-8
- Raju, P.T. (1971), The Philosophical Traditions of India, Delhi: Motilal Banarsidass (1992 Reprint)
- Olivelle, Patrick (2008) [1996], Upanisads. A new translation by Patrick Olivelle, Oxford University Press
- Reddy Juturi, Ravi Kumar (2021), "Gaudapadacharya "asparsa yoga" for attaining "no mind": A historical method of advaita vedanta for teaching "human liberation" in a profound way", International Journal of Yoga: Philosophy, Psychology and Parapsychology, 9 (2): 67–72, doi:10.4103/2347-5633.329692, S2CID 240322563
- Sarma, Chandradhar (1997). Indian Philosophy A Critical Survey.
- Sarma, Chandradhar (2007), The Advaita Tradition in Indian Philosophy, Motilal Banarsidass, ISBN 978-8120813120
- Sharma, Arvind (2012). Sleep as a State of Consciousness in Advaita Vedānta. State University of New York Press. ISBN 978-0-7914-8430-2.
