= Buddhist influences on Advaita Vedanta =

Influence of Mahāyāna Buddhism on Advaita Vedānta

Advaita Vedānta and Mahāyāna Buddhism share significant similarities. Those similarities have attracted attention both by Indian and Western scholars of Eastern philosophy and Oriental studies, and have also been criticised by concurring schools. The similarities have been interpreted as Buddhist influences on Advaita Vedānta, though some deny such influences, or see them as expressions of the same eternal truth.

Advaita Vedānta (Sanskrit: अद्वैत वेदान्त; literally, not-two) is the oldest extant sub-school of Vedānta, an orthodox (āstika) school of Hindu philosophy and religious practice. Advaita darśana (philosophy, worldview, teaching) is one of the classic Indian paths to spiritual realization and liberation. It first took shape systematically with the writings of the medieval Indian philosopher Gauḍapāda in the 6th century CE.

Mahayana Buddhism refers to a broad group of Buddhist traditions, texts, philosophies, and practices developed in ancient India (c. 1st century BCE onwards). The earliest evidence of Mahāyāna Buddhism comes from sūtras ("discourses", scriptures) originating around the beginning of the common era.

Buddhism as a whole saw a major decline in the Indian subcontinent during the Middle Ages after the rise of new forms of Hinduism, especially the Advaita tradition.

== Buddhist influences ==
Scholarly views regarding the influence of Mahāyāna Buddhism on Advaita Vedānta have historically and in modern times ranged from "Advaita and Buddhism are very different", to "Advaita and Buddhism absolutely coincide in their main tenets", to "after purifying Buddhism and Advaita of accidental or historically conditioned accretions, both systems can be safely regarded as an expression of one and the same eternal absolute truth."

=== Similarities ===
Advaita Vedānta and other schools of Hindu philosophy share numerous terminology, doctrines, and dialectical techniques with Buddhism. According to a 1918 paper by the Buddhist scholar O. Rozenberg, "a precise differentiation between Brahmanism and Buddhism is impossible to draw." T. R. V. Murti notices that "the ultimate goal" of Vedānta, Sāṃkhya, and Mahāyāna Buddhism is "remarkably similar"; while Advaita Vedānta postulates a "foundational self", according to Murti "Mahāyāna Buddhism implicitly affirms the existence of a deep underlying reality behind all empirical manifestations in its conception of śūnyatā (the indeterminate, the void), or vijñapti-mātra (consciousness only), or tathātā (thatness), or dhārmata (noumenal reality)."

Both traditions hold that "the empirical world is transitory, a show of appearances", and both admit "degrees of truth or existence". Both traditions emphasize the human need for spiritual liberation (moksha, nirvana, kaivalya), however with different assumptions. (Note: Helmuth von Glasenapp writes: "The Buddhist Nirvana is, therefore, not the primordial ground, the eternal essence, which is at the basis of everything and form which the whole world has arisen (the Brahman of the Upanishads) but the reverse of all that we know, something altogether different which must be characterized as a nothing in relation to the world, but which is experienced as highest bliss by those who have attained to it (Anguttara Nikaya, Navaka-nipata 34). Vedantists and Buddhists have been fully aware of the gulf between their doctrines, a gulf that cannot be bridged over. According to Majjhima Nikaya, Sutta 22, a doctrine that proclaims "The same is the world and the self. This I shall be after death; imperishable, permanent, eternal!" (see Brihadaranyaka Upanishad 4, 4, 13), was styled by the Buddha a perfectly foolish doctrine. On the other side, the Katha Upanishad (2, 1, 14) does not see a way to deliverance in the Buddhist theory of dharmas (impersonal processes): He who supposes a profusion of particulars gets lost like rain water on a mountain slope; the truly wise man, however, must realize that his Atman is at one with the Universal Atman, and that the former, if purified from dross, is being absorbed by the latter, "just as clear water poured into clear water becomes one with it, indistinguishably.") According to Frank Whaling, the similarities between Advaita Vedānta and Buddhism are not limited to the terminology and some doctrines, but also includes practice. The monastic rules and cenobitic tradition in Advaitin monasticism are similar to those found in Buddhist monasticism.

=== Mahāyāna philosophy ===
The influence of Mahāyāna Buddhism on Advaita Vedānta has been significant. Sharma points out that the early commentators on the Brahma Sūtras were all realists, or pantheist realists. He states that they were influenced by Buddhism, particularly during the 5th–6th centuries CE with the development of the Yogācāra school of Buddhist philosophy. Von Glasenapp states that there was a mutual influence between Vedānta and Buddhism. (Note: Helmuth von Glasenapp (1995), Vedanta & Buddhism: A comparative study, Buddhist Publication Society, pages 2-3, Quote: "Vedānta and Buddhism have lived side by side for such a long time that obviously they must have influenced each other. The strong predilection of the Indian mind for a doctrine of universal unity has led the representatives of Mahāyāna to conceive Saṃsāra and Nirvāṇa as two aspects of the same and single true reality; for Nāgārjuna the empirical world is a mere appearance, as all dharmas, manifest in it, are perishable and conditioned by other dharmas, without having any independent existence of their own. Only the indefinable "Voidness" (Śūnyatā) to be grasped in meditation, and realized in Nirvāṇa, has true reality [in Buddhism]".) S. N. Dasgupta and Mohanta suggest that Buddhism and Advaita Vedānta represent "different phases of development of the same non-dualistic metaphysics from the Upanishadic period to the time of Śaṅkara." (Note: This development did not end with Advaita Vedānta but continued in Tantrism and various schools of Shaivism. Non-dual Kashmir Shaivism, for example, was influenced by, and took over doctrines from, several orthodox and heterodox Indian religious and philosophical traditions. These include the orthodox Hindu schools of Vedānta, Sāṃkhya, Patañjali's Yoga tradition, and Nyāya, and prominent Buddhist schools, including Yogācāra and Mādhyamaka, but also Tantra and the Nath-tradition.) Eliot Deutsch and Rohit Dalvi state:

In any event a close relationship between the Mahayana schools and Vedanta did exist with the latter borrowing some of the dialectical techniques, if not the specific doctrines, of the former much like early Buddhism adopted Upanishadic terminology and borrowed its doctrines to Buddhist goals; both used pre-existing concepts and ideas to convey new meanings.

The influence of Mahāyāna Buddhism on other Indian religions and philosophies was not limited to the Vedānta tradition alone. Kalupahana notes that Buddhaghoṣa's Visuddhimagga (5th century CE), a comprehensive summary of older Sinhala commentaries on the scriptural canon of Theravāda Buddhism, contains "some metaphysical speculations, such as those of the Sarvāstivādins, the Sautrāntikas, and even the Yogācārins".

==== Gauḍapāda ====
According to Sarma, "to mistake him [Gauḍapāda] to be a hidden or open Buddhist is absurd". The doctrines of Gauḍapāda and Gautama Buddha are totally opposed, states Murti:

We have been talking of borrowing, influence and relationship in rather general terms. It is necessary to define the possible nature of the borrowing, granting that it did take place [...] The Vedantins stake everything on the Ātman (Brahman) and accept the authority of the Upanishads. We have pointed out at length the Nairātmyā standpoint of Buddhism and its total opposition to the Ātman (Self, substance, the permanent and universal) in any form.

Advaitins have traditionally challenged the Buddhist influence thesis. The influence of Buddhist doctrines on Gauḍapāda has been a vexed question. Modern scholarship generally accepts that Gauḍapāda was influenced by Buddhism, at least in terms of using Buddhist terminology to explain his ideas, but adds that Gauḍapāda was a Vedantin and not a Buddhist. Gauḍapāda adopted some Buddhist terminology and borrowed its doctrines to his Vedantic goals, much like early Buddhism adopted Upanishadic terminology and borrowed its doctrines to Buddhist goals; both used pre-existing concepts and ideas to convey new meanings. While there is shared terminology, the Advaita doctrines of Gauḍapāda and Gautama Buddha also show differences.

The influence of Mahāyāna Buddhism on Advaita Vedānta, states Deutsch, goes back at least to Gauḍapāda, where he "clearly draws from Buddhist philosophical sources for many of his arguments and distinctions and even for the forms and imagery in which these arguments are cast, much like how Buddhists had borrowed Vedic terminology." According to Plott, the influence of Buddhism on Gauḍapāda is undeniable and to be expected. Gauḍapāda, in his Kārikā texts, uses the leading concepts and wording of Mahāyāna Buddhism but, states John Plott, he reformulated them to the Upanishadic themes. Yet, according to Plott, this influence is to be expected:

We must emphasize again that generally throughout the Gupta Dynasty, and even more so after its decline, there developed such a high degree of syncretism and such toleration of all points of view that Mahayana Buddhism had been Hinduized almost as much as Hinduism had been Buddhaized.

According to Mahadevan, Gauḍapāda adopted Buddhist terminology and borrowed its doctrines to his Vedantic goals, much like early Buddhism adopted Upanishadic terminology and borrowed its doctrines to Buddhist goals; both used pre-existing concepts and ideas to convey new meanings. Gauḍapāda took over the Buddhist doctrines that ultimate reality is pure consciousness (vijñapti-mātra) (Note: It is often used interchangeably with the term citta-mātra, but they have different meanings. The standard translation of both terms is "consciousness-only" or "mind-only." Several modern researchers object this translation, and the accompanying label of "absolute idealism" or "idealistic monism". A better translation for vijñapti-mātra is representation-only.) and "that the nature of the world is the four-cornered negation, which is the structure of Māyā". Gauḍapāda also took over the Buddhist concept of ajāta from Nāgārjuna's Mādhyamaka philosophy, which uses the term anutpāda. (Note: An means "not", or "non"; utpāda means "genesis", "coming forth", "birth" Taken together anutpāda means "having no origin", "not coming into existence", "not taking effect", "non-production". (Note: Sanskrit Dictionary for Spoken Sanskrit, Anutpāda))

Michael Comans states Gauḍapāda, an early Vedantin, utilised some arguments and reasoning from Mādhyamaka Buddhist texts by quoting them almost verbatim. However, Comans adds there is a fundamental difference between Buddhist thought and that of Gauḍapāda, in that Buddhism has as its philosophical basis the doctrine of dependent origination (pratītya-samutpāda), according to which "everything is without an essential nature (nissvabhava), and everything is empty of essential nature (svabhava-sunya)", while Gauḍapāda does not rely upon this central teaching of Buddhism at all, and therefore should not be considered a Buddhist. Gauḍapāda's Ajātivāda (doctrine of no-origination or non -creation) is an outcome of reasoning applied to an unchanging nondual reality according to which "there exists a Reality (sat) that is unborn (aja)" that has essential nature (svabhava) and this is the "eternal, undecaying Self, Brahman (Atman)". Thus, Gauḍapāda differs from Buddhist scholars such as the Indian Buddhist monk and philosopher Nāgārjuna (3rd century CE), states Comans, by accepting the premises and relying on the fundamental teaching of the Upanishads.

Gauḍapāda, states Raju, "wove Buddhist doctrines into a philosophy of the Māṇḍukya Upanisad, which was further developed by Shankara". Of particular interest is Chapter Four of Gauḍapāda's text Karika, in which according to Bhattacharya, two karikas refer to Gautama Buddha and the term Asparśayoga is borrowed from Buddhism. According to Murti, "the conclusion is irresistible that Gauḍapāda, a Vedānta philosopher, is attempting an Advaitic interpretation of Vedānta in the light of the Mādhyamika and Yogācāra doctrines. He even freely quotes and appeals to them." However, adds Murti, the doctrines are unlike Buddhism. Chapter One, Two, and Three are entirely Vedantin and founded on the Upanishads, with little Buddhist flavor. Further, state both Murti and King, no Vedānta scholars who followed Gauḍapāda ever quoted from Chapter Four, they only quote from the first three.

==== Adi Shankara ====
Given the principal role attributed to Ādi Śaṅkara in the Advaita tradition, his works have been examined by scholars for similarities with Buddhism. Buddhism supporters have targeted Śaṅkara, states Biderman, while his Hindu supporters state that "accusations" concerning explicit or implicit Buddhist influence are not relevant. Śaṅkara, states Natalia Isaeva, incorporated "into his own system a Buddhist notion of māyā which had not been minutely elaborated in the Upanishads". According to Mudgal, Śaṅkara's Advaita view and Nāgārjuna's Mādhyamaka view of ultimate reality are compatible because they are both transcendental, indescribable, non-dual and only arrived at through a via negativa or neti neti. Mudgal concludes therefore that "the difference between Śūnyavāda philosophy of Buddhism and Advaita philosophy of Hinduism may be a matter of emphasis, not of kind". (Note: Ninian Smart, a historian of religion, quotes Mudgal view that "the differences between Shankara and Mahayana doctrines are largely a matter of emphasis and background, rather than essence". Ninian Smart is a proponent of the so-called "common core thesis", which states that all forms of mysticism share a common core. See also (Note: Stanford Encyclopedia of Mysticism, Mysticism) and)

Similarly, there are many points of contact between the Buddhist Yogācāra school and Śaṅkara's Advaita tradition. According to S. N. Dasgupta,

Śaṅkara and his followers borrowed much of their dialectic form of criticism from the Buddhists. His Brahman was very much like the śūnya of Nāgārjuna [...] The debts of Śaṅkara to the self-luminosity (Note: Self-luminosity; see Deutsch 1973, p. 48; Dasgupta 1975, pp. 148–149; Indich 2000, pp. 24, 28; Menon 2012; Ganeri 2019, p. 103; Murti 1983, p. 339; Isaeva 1993, p. 102. For the translation and meaning of svayam prakāśa: svayam: "himself, autonomous, in person" (Sanskrit Dictionary for Spoken Sanskrit, svayam); prakāśa: "manifestation," literally "light" or "illumination"; "the capacity to disclose, present, or make manifest" (Fasching 2021 note 1, referring to "MacKenzie 2017, 335; cf. also Ram-Prasad 2007, 53"); Svayam prakāśa can be translated as: "self-luminous" (Ganeri 2019; Menon 2012); "self-revealing" (Dasgupta 1975)); "self-manifesting" (Chatterjea 2003, p. 1); "Self-aware" (Wood 1992, p. 102); "Immediate" (Murti 1983, p. 339); On the meaning of svayam prakāśa: Menezes 2017, p. 198: "Self-luminosity (svayam prakāśa) means self is pure awareness by nature"; idem Ganeri 2019: "self is pure awareness by nature."; Murti 1983, p. 339: "a foundational consciousness [...] to which everything is presented, but is itself no presentation, that which knows all, but is itself no object."; For a detailed treatment, see Mackenzie 2012; Fasching 2011.) of the Vijñānavāda Buddhism can hardly be overestimated. There seems to be much truth in the accusations against Śaṅkara by Vijñāna Bhikṣu and others that he was a hidden Buddhist himself. I am led to think that Śaṅkara's philosophy is largely a compound of Vijñānavāda and Śūnyavāda Buddhism with the Upanishadic notion of the permanence of self superadded.

Daniel Ingalls writes, "If we are to adopt a metaphysical and static view of philosophy there is little difference between Shankara and Vijnanavada Buddhism, so little, in fact that the whole discussion is fairly pointless. But if we try to think our way back into minds of philosophers whose works we read, there is a very real difference between the antagonists". Mudgal additionally states that the Upanishadic and Buddhist currents of thought "developed separately and independently, opposed to one another, as the orthodox and heterodox, the thesis and antithesis, and a synthesis was attempted by the Advaitin Shankara". According to Ingalls, the Japanese Buddhist scholarship has argued that Ādi Śaṅkara did not understand Buddhism.

=== Criticisms of concurring Hindu schools ===
Some Hindu scholars have criticized Advaita Vedānta for its notion of māyā and non-theistic doctrinal similarities with Buddhism, sometimes referring to the Advaita tradition as Māyāvāda.

Bhāskara, a Hindu philosopher of the Bhedabheda Vedānta school (9th century CE), accused Śaṅkara's Advaita tradition as "this despicable broken down Māyāvāda that has been chanted by the Mahāyāna Buddhists", characterizing it as a school that is undermining the ritual duties set in Vedic orthodoxy.

Rāmāṉuja, a Hindu saint and founder of the Vishishtadvaita Vedānta school (12th century CE), similarly accused Ādi Śaṅkara of being a Prachanna Bauddha, that is, a "crypto-Buddhist", and someone who was undermining the theistic Bhakti-oriented devotionalism.

=== Differences from Buddhism ===
==== Epistemology ====
The Advaita Vedānta tradition has historically rejected accusations of crypto-Buddhism highlighting their respective views on Ātman, Anattā, and Brahman. Some early Buddhist texts (1st millennium CE), such as the Mahāyāna Buddhist scriptures Tathāgatagarbha Sūtras suggest "self-like" concepts, variously called Tathāgatagarbha or "Buddha nature". However, in modern era studies, scholars such as Wayman state that these Buddhist "self-like" concepts are neither self nor sentient being, nor individual soul, nor personality. Some scholars posit that the Tathāgatagarbha Sūtras were written to promote Buddhism to non-Buddhists. In contrast, the earliest use of the word Ātman in Indian texts is found in the Rig Veda (RV X.97.11). Yāska, the ancient Indian grammarian, commenting on this Rigvedic verse, accepts the following meanings of Ātman: the pervading principle, the organism in which other elements are united and the ultimate sentient principle. Ātman is a central topic in all of the Upanishads, and "know your Ātman (Self)" is one of their thematic foci. The Mahavakyas, as documented in the Upanishads and tracing back to the Vedas, provide the theological Vedantic basis for Advaita philosophy.

The epistemological foundations of Buddhism and Advaita Vedānta are different. Buddhism accepts two valid means to reliable and correct knowledge—perception and inference, while Advaita Vedānta accepts six (described elsewhere in this article). However, some Buddhists in history, have argued that Buddhist scriptures are a reliable source of spiritual knowledge, corresponding to Advaita's Śabda pramana, however Buddhists have treated their scriptures as a form of inference method.

==== Ontology ====
Advaita Vedānta posits a substance ontology, an ontology which holds that underlying the change and impermanence of empirical reality is an unchanging and permanent absolute reality, like an eternal substance it calls Ātman-Brahman. In its substance ontology, as like other philosophies, there exist a universal, particulars, and specific properties, and it is the interaction of particulars that create events and processes. In contrast, Buddhism posits a process ontology, also called as "event ontology". According to Buddhist philosophy, particularly after the rise of ancient Mahāyāna Buddhist scholarship, the concept of impermanence (anicca) is understood as one of the three marks of existence (trilakṣaṇa): there is neither empirical nor absolute permanent reality, because all phenomena are characterized by their lack of a solid and independent existence (svabhāva), and ontology can be explained as a process. (Note: Kalupahana describes how in Buddhism there is also a current which favours substance ontology. Kalupahanan sees Mādhyamaka and Yogācāra as reactions against developments toward substance ontology in Buddhism.)

In Buddhist ontology, there is a system of dependent origination and interdependent phenomena (pratītya-samutpāda) but no stable persistent identities, neither eternal universals nor particulars. In Buddhism, thoughts and memories are mental constructions and fluid processes (skandhā) without a real observer, personal agent, or cognizer (anattā). By contrast, in Advaita Vedānta and the other orthodox schools of Hinduism, the eternal, unchanging ultimate self (ātman) identical with Brahman is understood as the real observer, personal agent, and cognizer. However, the historical Buddha considered this Brahmanical belief to be one of the six wrong views about the self; in fact, Buddha held that attachment to the appearance of a permanent self in this world of change is the cause of suffering (duḥkha), and the main obstacle to the attainment of spiritual liberation (mokṣa).

Advaita Vedānta holds the premise, "Soul exists, and Soul (self, or ātman) is a self evident truth". Buddhism, in contrast, holds the premise, "Atman does not exist, and An-atman (non-self, or anātman) is self evident". Chakravarthi Ram-Prasad gives a more nuanced view, stating that the Advaitins "assert a stable subjectivity, or a unity of consciousness through all the specific states of indivuated consciousness, but not an individual subject of consciousness [...] the Advaitins split immanent reflexivity from 'mineness'." The Upanishadic inquiry fails to find an empirical correlate of the assumed ātman, but nevertheless assumes its existence, and Advaitins "reify consciousness as an eternal self." In contrast, the Buddhist inquiry "is satisfied with the empirical investigation which shows that no such Atman exists because there is no evidence", states Jayatilleke.

The Abhidhamma Piṭaka, which is the third division of the scriptural canon of Theravāda Buddhism, considered all existence as dhamma, and left the ontological questions about reality and the nature of dhamma unexplained. According to Renard, Advaita's theory of three levels of reality is built on the two levels of reality found in Nāgārjuna's Mādhyamaka philosophy.

==== Śaṅkara's critique of Buddhism ====
A central concern for Ādi Śaṅkara, in his objections against Buddhism, is what he perceives as the underlying existential nihilism of the Buddhist doctrine. Śaṅkara states that there "must be something beyond cognition, namely a cognizer," which he asserts is the self-evident soul (ātman) or Witness-consciousness (Sākṣī). Buddhism, according to Śaṅkara, denies the existence of a cognizer entirely. He also considers the notion of Brahman as pure knowledge and "the quintessence of positive reality." The teachings of the oldest Principal Upanishads and Brahma Sūtras, according to Śaṅkara, differ from both the Buddhist realists (Sarvāstivādins) and the Buddhist idealists (Yogācārins). Śaṅkara elaborates on these arguments against various schools of Buddhism, partly presenting refutations which were already standard in his time, and partly offering his own objections.

Śaṅkara's original contribution in explaining the difference between Advaita and Buddhism was his "argument for identity" and the "argument for the witness". In his opinion, the Buddhists are internally inconsistent in their theories, because "the reservoir-consciousness that [they] set up, being momentary, is no better than ordinary consciousness. Or, if [they] allow the reservoir-consciousness to be lasting, [they] destroy [their] theory of momentariness." In response to the idealists, he notes that their alaya-vijnana, or store-house consciousness, runs counter to the Buddhist theory of momentariness. With regard to the Śūnyavāda doctrine of the Mādhyamaka school, Śaṅkara states that "being contradictory to all valid means of knowledge, we have not thought worth while to refute" and "common sense (loka-vyavahāra) cannot be denied without the discovery of some other truth".

==== Buddhist criticism of Vedānta philosophy ====
A few Buddhist philosophers made the opposite criticism in the medieval era toward their Buddhist opponents. In the 6th century CE, for example, the Mahāyāna Buddhist scholar Bhāviveka redefined Vedantic concepts to show how they fit into Mādhyamaka philosophy, and "equate[d] the Buddha's Dharma body with Brahman, the ultimate reality of the Upanishads." In his Madhyamakahṛdayakārikaḥ, Bhāviveka stages a Hīnayāna (Theravāda Buddhist) scholar as his interlocutor, who accuses Mahāyāna Buddhists of being "crypto-Vedantins". (Note: Nicholson: "a Hīnayāna interlocutor accuses the Mahāyāna Buddhist of being a crypto-Vedāntin, paralleling later Vedāntins who accuse the Advaita Vedānta of crypto-Buddhism.") Medieval-era Tibetan Gelugpa scholars accused the Jonang school of being "crypto-Vedantist." (Note: The Jonang school was influenced by Yogachara and taught Shentong Buddhism, which sees the highest Truth as self-existent.) Contemporary scholar David Kalupahana called the 7th-century Buddhist scholar Chandrakirti a "crypto-Vedantist", a view rejected by scholars of Mādhyamaka philosophy.

== Sources ==
=== Printed sources ===
- Baird, Robert D. (1986), "Swami Bhativedanta and the Bhagavd Gita As It Is", in Minor, Robert Neil (ed.), Modern Indian Interpreters of the Bhagavad Gita, SUNY Press
- Bhattacharya, Vidhushekhara (1943), Gauḍapādakārikā, Delhi: Motilal Banarsidass
- Biderman, Shlomo (1978). "Śankara and the Buddhists". Journal of Indian Philosophy. 6 (4). doi:10.1007/bf00218430. S2CID 170754201.
- Braue, Donald A. (1984), Māyā in Radhakrishnanʾs Thought: Six Meanings Other Than Illusion, Motilall Banarsidass, ISBN 978-0-8364-1129-4
- Chatterjea, Tara (2003), Knowledge and Freedom in Indian Philosophy, Lexington Books
- Clayton, John (2010), Religions, Reasons and Gods: Essays in Cross-cultural Philosophy of Religion, Cambridge University Press, ISBN 978-0521126274
- Comans, Michael (2000), The Method of Early Advaita Vedānta: A Study of Gauḍapāda, Śaṅkara, Sureśvara, and Padmapāda, Delhi: Motilal Banarsidass
- Dasgupta, Surendranath (1975), A history of Indian philosophy. Volume 2, Motilal Banarsidass Publ.
- Dasgupta, S.N. (1997). History of Indian Philosophy, Volume 1.
- Dasgupta, Sanghamitra; Mohanta, Dilip Kumar (1998). "Some reflections on the relation between Sankara and Buddhism". Indian Philosophical Quarterly. XXV (3, July 1998).
- Deutsch, Eliot (1973), Advaita Vedanta: A Philosophical Reconstruction, University of Hawaii Press, ISBN 978-0-8248-0271-4
- Deutsch, Eliot (1988), Advaita Vedanta: A Philosophical Reconstruction, University of Hawaii Press, ISBN 0-88706-662-3
- Deutsch, Eliot; Dalvi, Rohit (2004), The Essential Vedanta: A New Source Book of Advaita Vedanta, World Wisdom, Inc., ISBN 9780941532525
- Fasching, Wolfgang (2011), "'I Am of the Nature of Seeing': Phenomenological Reflections on the Indian Notion of Witness-Consciousness", in Siderits, M.; Thompson, E.; Zahavi, D. (eds.), Self, No Self? Perspectives from Analytical, Phenomenological, and Indian Traditions, Oxford: Oxford University Press
- Fasching, Wolfgang (2021), "Prakāśa. A few reflections on the Advaitic understanding of consciousness as presence and its relevance for philosophy of mind", Phenomenology and the Cognitive Sciences, 20 (4), Springer: 679–701, doi:10.1007/s11097-020-09690-2, S2CID 225385862
- Ganeri, Jonardon (2019), Indian Philosophy: A Reader, Routledge, ISBN 9781000728033
- Garfield, Jay L.; Priest, Graham (2003). "Nagarjuna and the Limits of Thought" (PDF). Philosophy East & West. 53 (1 (January)): 1–21. doi:10.1353/pew.2003.0004. hdl:11343/25880. S2CID 16724176.
- Glasenapp, Helmuth Von (1995), Vedanta & Buddhism: A comparative study, Buddhist Publication Society
- Goswami Abhay Charan Bhaktivedanta (1956), Shri Krishna The Supreme 'Vedantist', archived from the original on 4 January 2022
- Grimes, John A. (1990), The Seven Great Untenables: Sapta-vidhā Anupapatti, Motilall Banarsidass
- Grimes, John (1998), "Book reviews: Early Advaita Vedanta and Buddhism: The Mahayana Context of the Gaudapadiya-karika, by Richard King. SUNY Press (1995)", Journal of the American Academy of Religion, 66 (3), doi:10.1093/jaarel/66.3.684
- Grimes, John A. (1996), A Concise Dictionary of Indian Philosophy: Sanskrit Terms Defined in English, SUNY Press
- Hacker, Paul (1995), Philology and Confrontation: Paul Hacker on Traditional and Modern Vedanta, SUNY Press, ISBN 978-0-7914-2582-4
- Hookham, S. K. (1991). The Buddha Within: Tathagatagarbha Doctrine According to the Shentong Interpretation of the Ratnagotravibhaga. State University of New York Press. ISBN 978-0-7914-0357-0. Archived from the original on 16 January 2024.
- Indich, William (2000), Consciousness in Advaita Vedanta, Motilal Banarsidass, ISBN 978-8120812512
- Ingalls, Daniel H. H. (January 1954). "Samkara's Arguments against the Buddhists". Philosophy East and West. 3 (4): 291–306. doi:10.2307/1397287. JSTOR 1397287.
- Isaeva, N.V. (1993), Shankara and Indian Philosophy, SUNY Press
- Jayatilleke, K.N. (1963), Early Buddhist Theory of Knowledge (PDF) (1st ed.), London: George Allen & Unwin Ltd., archived from the original (PDF) on 11 September 2015
- Kalupahana, David J. (1994), A history of Buddhist philosophy, Delhi: Motilal Banarsidass Publishers Private Limited
- King, Richard (1995), Early Advaita Vedānta and Buddhism: The Mahāyāna Context of the Gauḍapādīya-kārikā, SUNY Press
- Kochumuttom, Thomas A. (1999), A buddhist Doctrine of Experience. A New Translation and Interpretation of the Works of Vasubandhu the Yogacarin, Delhi: Motilal Banarsidass
- Lopez Jr., Donald S., ed. (2007) [1995]. Buddhism in Practice: Abridged Edition. Princeton Readings in Religions. Princeton, New Jersey and Woodstock, Oxfordshire: Princeton University Press. pp. 3–36. doi:10.2307/j.ctvcm4h64.8. ISBN 9780691129686. JSTOR j.ctvcm4h64. LCCN 2006050985.
- Lorenzen, David N., ed. (2015), A dialogue between a Christian and a Hindu about religion, El Colegio de Mexico AC
- Loy, David (1982). "Enlightenment in Buddhism and Advaita Vedanta". International Philosophical Quarterly. 22 (1): 65–74. doi:10.5840/ipq19822217.
- Mackenzie, Matthew (2012), "Luminosity, Subjectivity, and Temporality: An Examination of Buddhist and Advaita views of Consciousness", in Kuznetsova, Irina; Ganeri, Jonardon; Ram-Prasad, Chakravarthi (eds.), Hindu and Buddhist Ideas in Dialogue: Self and No-Self, Routledge
- Menezes, Walter (2017), Exploring Ātman from the Perspective of the Vivekacūḍāmaṇi, Springer
- Menon, Sangeetha (2012), Advaita Vedanta, Internet Encyclopedia of Philosophy
- Mudgal, S.G. (1975). Advaita of Shankara: A Reappraisal. New Delhi: Motilal Banarasidass.
- Muller-Ortega, Paul E. (2010), Triadic Heart of Siva: Kaula Tantricism of Abhinavagupta in the Non-Dual Shaivism of Kashmir, SUNY press
- Murti, TRV (1955), The central philosophy of Buddhism, Routledge (2008 Reprint), ISBN 978-0-415-46118-4
- Murti, T.R.V. (1983), "The World and the Individual in Indian Religious Thought", Studies in Indian Thought: Collected Papers of Prof. T.R.V. Murti, Motilal Banarsidass Publ.
- Nicholson, Andrew J. (2010), Unifying Hinduism: Philosophy and Identity in Indian Intellectual History, Columbia University Press
- Nikhilananda, Swami (2008), The Upanishads, A New Translation, Volume 2. Kolkata: Advaita Ashrama, ISBN 978-81-7505-302-1
- Plott, John (2000), Global History of Philosophy: The Patristic-Sutra period (325 - 800 AD), Volume 3, Motilal Banarsidass, ISBN 978-8120805507
- Potter, Karl. H. (1981), Gaudapada, Encyclopedia of Indian Philosophies: Advaita Vedānta up to Śaṃkara and his pupils, Volume 3, Motilal Banarsidass, ISBN 81-208-0310-8
- Potter, Karl (1977), Meaning and Truth in Encyclopedia of Indian Philosophies, Volume 2, Motilal Banarsidass, ISBN 81-208-0309-4
- Puligandla, Ramakrishna (1997), Fundamentals of Indian Philosophy, New Delhi: D.K. Printworld (P) Ltd., ISBN 9788124600870
- Raju, P.T. (1992) [1971], The Philosophical Traditions of India, Delhi: Motilal Banarsidass Publishers Private Limited
- Renard, Philip (2010), Non-Dualisme. De directe bevrijdingsweg, Cothen: Uitgeverij Juwelenschip
- Saraswati, Chandrasekharendra (1995), Hindu Dharma: The Universal Way of Life, Bhavan's Book University, ISBN 81-7276-055-8
- Sarma, Candradhara (2007), The Advaita Tradition in Indian Philosophy, Motilal Banarsidass, ISBN 978-8120813120
- Sharma, Arvind (2007), Advaita Vedānta: An Introduction, Motilal Banarsidass, ISBN 978-8120820272
- Sharma, B. N. Krishnamurti (2000), A History of the Dvaita School of Vedānta and Its Literature, 3rd Edition, Motilal Banarsidass Pvt. Ltd.(2008 Reprint), ISBN 978-8120815759
- Sharma, Chandradhar (1996), The Advaita Tradition in Indian Philosophy, Delhi: Motilal Banarsidass
- Sharma, D (1966). "Epistemological negative dialectics of Indian logic, Abhāva versus Anupalabdhi". Indo-Iranian Journal. 9 (4): 291–300. doi:10.1163/000000066790086530.
- Suzuki, Daisetz Teitarō (1999), Studies in the Laṅkāvatāra Sūtra, Delhi: Motilal Banarsidass
- Wayman, Alex (1999), A Millennium of Buddhist Logic, Volume 1, Motilal Banarsidass, ISBN 978-8120816466
- Whaling, Frank (1979). "Shankara and Buddhism". Journal of Indian Philosophy. 7 (1): 1–42. doi:10.1007/BF02561251. S2CID 170613052.
- Williams, Paul; Tribe, Anthony; Wynne, Alexander (2000). Buddhist Thought: A Complete Introduction to the Indian Tradition. Routledge. ISBN 0-415-20701-0.
- Williams, Paul (2008). Mahayana Buddhism: The Doctrinal Foundations. Routledge. ISBN 978-1-134-25056-1. Archived from the original on 11 January 2023.
- Wood, Thomas E. (1992), The Māṇḍūkya Upaniṣad and the Āgama Śāstra: An Investigation Into the Meaning of the Vedānta
