= Taijasa =

Hindu and Sanskrit term

Taijasa (Sanskrit: तैजस), which means endowed with light, is one of the many different levels of existence which the Jiva experiences due to the activity of Maya; it is the second of the three stages of consciousness that are part of the individual order of the Jiva. The three stages of consciousness are – 1) Vishva or Vaisvanara or the waking stage characterized by the individual gross body or sthula-sarira, 2) Taijasa or the dream consciousness which has the subtle body or suksma sharira as its object, and 3) Pragyana or the deep sleep consciousness which is the unified undifferentiated consciousness or pragyanaaghana and the characteristic of the blissful causal body, the ultimate experience of Brahman.

== Upanishads ==
Yajnavalkya tells Janaka that Indha, the kindler, cryptically called Indra, resides in the right eye; the person in the left eye is Indha's wife, Viraj, their meeting place is the space within the heart. Therefore, the soul is composed of Indha, who in the context of Creation is prana, the fundamental energy, and Viraj, who is the diversity-producing principle. Shankara in his commentary on Brihadaranyaka Upanishad IV.2.2-4 interprets Indha as the Self in the Waking stage, the union of Indha-Viraj as the Self in the dream stage and Viraj as the Self in the deep sleep stage; he calls the Self of the second stage as taijasa i.e. the one shining in the mind. Shankara also describes it as hrdaya-bhuta, the self that has become the heart.

Verse 4 of the Mandukya Upanishad Agama-prakarna reads:

स्वप्नस्थानोऽन्तः प्रज्ञः सप्ताङ्ग एकोनविंशतिमुखः प्रविविक्तभुक् तैजसो द्वितीयः पादः ||४||

The second quarter (Pada) is Taijasa whose sphere of activity is the dream state, who is conscious of the internal objects, who has seven limbs and nineteen mouths and who experiences the subtle objects.

Taijasa, the Luminous and whose sphere of action is dream, and who is the inward oriented consciousness, is the sound syllable U of Aum because it is exalted and because it is intermediate, just as U occurs between A and M, Taijasa is intermediate between Vaisvanara and Prajna. The secret of the intermediate U is that the listener of this sound syllable becomes the knower of truth, of reality; U being labial modifies speech represented by the sound syllable A which is the primordial guttural sound and then sinks into the silence of M which measures both A and U and absorbs them. Shankara explains the identification of Taijasa with U by their common features of superiority and being intermediate. After gaining this understanding, the Fourth stage, Turiya, is reached and all sufferings end. Shankara explains that Turiya is the same Atman realized when the states of Visva, Taijasa and Pranja are negated and not a separate fourth state.

== Advaita Vedanta ==
Reality Consciousness conditioned by its own identifications with the subtle body becomes the dreamer and experiences the dream-world as Taijasa. The waking-state-ego has nineteen mouths – the five organs of action, the five aspects of Prana, the vital breath, the mind, intellect, egoity and citta. The Atman manifesting through the gross body, Vaisvanara, is seven-limbed. The dreamer enjoys the subtle world of objects because he is aware only of the inner world.

In the Tattva-vivekah chapter of Pancadasi Sloka 24, Vidyaranya Swami explains:-

प्राज्ञस्तत्राभिमानेन तैजसत्वं प्रपद्यते |
हिरण्यगर्भतामीशस्तयोर्व्यष्टिसमष्टिता ||

that the one undivided consciousness in its microcosmic aspect is called Taijasa; and in its macrocosmic aspect, Hiranyagarbha or Ishvara, the totality because of identification with all subtle bodies of the universe, the former is the consciousness identified with the subtle body of the Jiva, the reflection of consciousness.

== Saiva Siddhanta ==
According to the Saiva Siddhanta, the ahankara-tattva is manifested three-folds - first as the Taijasa dominated by sattva, the second as the Vaikarika dominated by rajasa, and the third as the Bhutadika dominated by tamasa, thus distinguishing categorically the consequence of the domination of each quality. Sattva is called Taijasa because of its illuminating capacity and from this aspect evolve, in addition to the manas-tattva, the five organs or faculties of sense.

== Samkhya ==
The Samkhya school associates sattva with Vaikarika and rajasa with Taijasa. In Samkhya, rajas is necessary for activity but does not independently evolve further categories (the mind, sense and motor faculties, and subtle elements).

== Sources ==
- Swami Nikhilananda (1949). Mandukya Upanishad & Karika with Shankara Bhashya - Swami Nikhilananda. Sri Ramakrishna Ashrama Mysore.
