= Sthitaprajna =

Concept of person who is settled

Sthitaprajna (Sanskrit: स्थितप्रज्ञ, IAST: sthitaprajña, "one whose wisdom is firmly established") is a term in the Bhagavad Gita for the ideal of a perfected person whose understanding has become so settled that no external circumstance can disturb its psychological state.

== Etymology ==
The compound sthitaprajña joins two elements. Sthita (स्थित) is the past passive participle of the verbal root √sthā (स्था, "to stand, stay, remain, be established") and carries the sense "standing, situated, firm, steady, established". It descends from Proto-Indo-European *steh₂- ("to stand") and is cognate with Latin status and Ancient Greek statós.

Prajña (प्रज्ञ, "wise, prudent, knowing") is formed from the intensifying prefix pra- (प्र) and jña (ज्ञ, "knowing, familiar with"), and is the root of the noun prajñā ("wisdom, insight, discernment"). The compound therefore denotes one whose prajñā has become sthita: a person of steady, established wisdom.

== In the Bhagavad Gita ==
The term is introduced in Chapter 2, when Arjuna asks Krishna at verse 2.54 how a person of steady wisdom speaks, sits, and moves. Krishna's reply, running from 2.55 to 2.72, describes a person who has renounced all cravings of the mind, is content in the self alone, remains unmoved in sorrow and unexcited in pleasure, is free of fear and anger, and can withdraw the senses from their objects as a tortoise draws in its limbs. The 19 verses form a distinct section sometimes called the sthitaprajña-prakaraṇa, and the term is generally regarded as original to the Gita, not found in the earlier Upanishads.

== In the Vivekachudamani ==
The term sthitaprajña is also treated in the Vivekachudamani, a treatise traditionally ascribed to Shankara, where it carries a more strictly Advaitic meaning than in the Gita. In his Gita commentary Shankara already reads the prajñā of the sthitaprajña not as steady mentality in general but as the specific realisation that the self is the supreme Brahman, and the Vivekachudamani makes that realisation the whole of the definition.

Its verse 428 defines prajñā as the objectless (nirvikalpa) mental modification (vṛtti) consisting of pure consciousness alone, and calls one in whom this is permanent a sthitaprajña. On this account the mind, having no object whose form to take, rests as pure consciousness itself.

According to Arvind Sharma, the contrast between the two portraits is sharp: the sthitaprajña of the Gita can be understood without reference to the identity of Atman and Brahman or to the cessation of mental modifications, whereas that of the Vivekachudamani can be grasped only in those terms. Sharma reads Shankara's Gita commentary as an intermediate stage between the Gita's account and the fully Advaitic one of the Vivekachudamani.

== Interpretations ==
The scholar S. N. Dasgupta characterised the Gita's prajñā not as the grasp of a philosophical truth but as "a fixed and unperturbed state of the mind", one in which will and intellect stay steady in the course of duty, free of attachment and undisturbed by pleasure or sorrow. In his commentary on the Gita, Adi Shankara gives the steady-wisdom passage a non-dualist reading, interpreting the realized sthitaprajña through knowledge of the identity of the self and Brahman.

== See also ==
- Prajñā (Hinduism)
- Vivekachudamani
- Samatva
- Jivanmukta
