= Vakya Vritti =

Vakya Vritti is a Vedantic textbook, a small treatise, that concerns itself with the detailed and elaborate explanation of two Mahāvākyas – aham brahmāsmi and tat tvam asi which great Sruti sentences are intended to give a direct perception of Brahman. The Laghu vakya vritti deals with the former vakya only.

Vakya Vritti is a text of fifty-two Sanskrit slokas attributed to Adi Shankara and is in the form of a dialogue between an eager student and an enlightened teacher. There exists a very old commentary on this text but the name of its author is not known. Swami Chinmayananda's commentary on this exhaustive exposition of the Mahavakya Tat Tvam Asi was published in 1981. To explain each mantra as lucidly as a Guru (teacher) can is called Vritti. In Vakya Vritti a student approaches his Guru with a confession that the subject Mahavakya does not add up to any vivid understanding in his mind, and the teacher patiently elucidates what exactly the scripture means by the words employed in this significant sentence.

== The Major Premises ==
The dialogue of the Vakya Vritti can be thought of as having the following major premises:

1. Tvam (You) refers to the spark of Divinity within each sentient being, which enlivens that being
2. Tat (That) refers to the immortal Brahman, the source of all life all around
3. Asi (are) refers to the Tvam-substance and the Tat-substance as being the same entity
