= Turiya =

Hindu philosophical term for the perceiving self as atman

In Hindu philosophy, turiya (Sanskrit: तुरीय, meaning "the fourth"), also referred to as chaturiya or chaturtha, is the true self (atman) beyond the three common states of consciousness (waking, dreaming, and dreamless deep sleep). It is postulated in several Upanishads and explicated in Gaudapada's Mandukya Karika.

== Upanishads ==
Turiya as 'the fourth' is referred to in a number of principal Upanishads. One of the earliest mentions of the phrase turiya, "fourth", is in verse 5.14.3 of the Brihadaranyaka Upanishad, referring to a 'fourth foot' of the Gayatri Mantra, the first, second and third foot being the 24 syllables of this mantra:

Then there is that fourth (turiya) vivid foot of the Gayatri, which is none other than the sun blazing beyond the sky. The term turiya means the same thing as 'fourth'(caturtha). 'Vivid foot' for the sunblazes beyond the entire expanse of the sky. A man who knows this foot of the Gayatri in this way will likewise blaze with splendour and fame. (Note: Sanskrit (Wikisource): प्राणोऽपानो व्यान इत्यष्टावक्षराणि अष्टाक्षर ह वा एकं गायत्र्यै पदम् एतदु हैवास्या एतत् स यावदिदं प्राणि तावद्ध जयति योऽस्या एतदेवं पदं वेद अथास्या एतदेव तुरीयं दर्शतं पदं परोरजा य एष तपति यद्वै चतुर्थं तत्तुरीयम् दर्शतं पदमिति ददृश इव ह्येष परोरजा इति सर्वमु ह्येवैष रज उपर्युपरि तपत्य् एव हैव श्रिया यशसा तपति योऽस्या एतदेवं पदं वेद ॥ ३ ॥)

According to Raju, chapter 8.7 through 8.12 of the Chandogya Upanishad, though not mentioning turiya, 'anticipate' the Mandukya Upanishad and it's treatment of turiya. (Note: (Raju 1985, pp. 32–33): "We can see that this story [in Chandogya Upanishad] is an anticipation of the Mandukya doctrine, (...)") These verses of the Chandogya Upanishad set out a dialogue between Indra and Virocana, in search of atman, the immortal perceiver, and Prajapati, their teacher. After rejecting the physical body, the dream self, and the dreamless sleep (in which there is no perception of "I am") as atman, Prajapati declares in verse 12 to Indra that the mortal body is the abode of the "immortal and non-bodily self", which is the perceiver, the one who perceives due to the faculties of the senses.

The phrase "turiya" also appears in Maitri Upanishad in sections 6.19 (in the context of yoga) and 7.11:

Now, it has elsewhere been said: 'Verily, when a knower has restrained his mind from the external, and the breathing spirit (prāṇa) has put to rest objects of sense, there-upon let him continue void of conceptions. Since the living individual (jīva) who is named "breathing spirit" has arisen here from what is not breathing spirit, therefore, verily, let the breathing spirit restrain his breathing spirit in what is called the fourth condition (tiwya)' For thus has it been said:-

That which is non-thought, [yet] which stands in the midst of thought,
The unthinkable, supreme mystery! —
Thereon let one concentrate his thought

And the subtle body (linga), too, without support.

— Maitri Upanishad, Section 6.19

7.11: He who sees with the eye, and he who moves in dreams,

He who is deep asleep, and he who is beyond the deep sleeper —
These are a person's four distinct conditions.

Of these the fourth (turya) is greater [than the rest].

— Maitri Upanishad, Section 7.11

Verse 7 of the Mandukya Upanishad refers to "the fourth" (caturtha), or "the fourth quarter", the first, second and third quarter being situated in the waking, dreaming and dreamless state:

They consider the fourth quarter as perceiving neither what is inside nor what is outside, nor even both together; not as a mass of perception, neither as perceiving nor as not perceiving; as unseen; as beyond the reach of ordinary transaction; as ungraspable; as without distinguishing marks; as unthinkable; as indescribable; as one whose essence is the perception of itself alone; as the cessation of the visible world; as tranquil; as auspicious; as without a second. That is the self (atman), and is that which should be perceived.

Michael Comans disagrees with Nakamura's suggestion that "the concept of the fourth realm (caturtha) was perhaps influenced by the Sunyata of Mahayana Buddhism", (Note: H. Nakamura, A History of Early Vedanta Philosophy, Delhi: Motilal Banarsidass, 1983, p.34, note 37, referred to in (Comans 2000, p. 98) According to Comans, "It is impossible to see how the unequivocal teaching of a permanent, underlying reality, which is explicitly called the "Self", could show early Mahayana influence.") stating that "[T]here can be no suggestion that the teaching about the underlying Self as contained in the Mandukya contains shows any trace of Buddhist thought, as this teaching can be traced to the pre-Buddhist Brhadaranyaka Upanishad."

According to Ellen Goldberg, this fourth quarter describes a state of meditation; the insight during meditation of Turiya is known as amātra, the 'immeasurable' or 'measureless' in the Mandukya Upanishad, being synonymous with samādhi in Yoga terminology.

=== AUM and four states of consciousness ===
In the Mandukya Upanishad, AUM symbolizes the four states of consciousness. The three parts in A-U-M corresponds to waking, dreaming, and sleep states. The fourth state, (turīya avasthā), corresponds to silence, just as the other three correspond to AUM. It is the substratum of the other three states. It is, states Nakamura, atyanta-shunyata (absolute emptiness). According to Sharma, Turiya is "the common ground of all these states. It manifests itself in these three states and yet in its own nature it transcends them all".

== Advaita Vedanta ==
=== Gaudapada ===
Gaudapada, an early guru in Advaita Vedanta, was the author or compiler (Note: Nakamura notes that there are contradictions in doctrine between the four chapters.) of the Māṇḍukya Kārikā, a commentary on the Māṇḍukya Upanishad, also known as the Gauḍapāda Kārikā and as the Āgama Śāstra. Gaudapada was influenced by Buddhism, though he was a Vedantin and not a Buddhist. In the Māṇḍukya Kārikā, Gaudapada deals with perception, idealism, causality, truth, and reality. In his commentary on verse 7 of the Mandukya Upanishad, Gaudapada explains Turiya, the fourth state of consciousness, as the ultimate reality that transcends the waking, dreaming, and the deep sleep states. According to Gaudapada, Turiya is beyond cause and effect and is the pure, self-luminous consciousness in which all dualistic distinctions between subject and object cease to exist. The phenomenal world is an appearance produced by maya (illusion), while Turiya is the non-dual reality. For Gaudapada, turiya is the "true 'state' of experience," in which the infinite (ananta) and non-different (advaita/abheda) are apprehended.

Isaeva notes that the Mandukya Upanishad asserts that "the world of individual souls and external objects is just a projection of one indivisible consciousness (citta)," which is "identical with the eternal and immutable atman of the Upanisads [..] in contrast to momentary vijnana taught by the Buddhist schools." (Note: See also: Steven Collins (1994), Religion and Practical Reason (Editors: Frank Reynolds, David Tracy), State Univ of New York Press, ISBN 978-0791422175, page 64: "Central to Buddhist soteriology is the doctrine of not-self (Pali: anattā, Sanskrit: anātman, the opposed doctrine of ātman is central to Brahmanical thought). Expressed very briefly, this is the [Buddhist] doctrine that human beings have no soul, no self, no unchanging essence."; John C. Plott et al (2000), Global History of Philosophy: The Axial Age, Volume 1, Motilal Banarsidass, ISBN 978-8120801585, page 63: "The Buddhist schools reject any Ātman concept. As we have already observed, this is the basic and ineradicable distinction between Hinduism and Buddhism".)

=== Adi Shankara ===
Adi Shankara described, on the basis of the ideas propounded in the Mandukya Upanishad, the three states of consciousness, namely waking (jågrata), dreaming (svapna), and deep sleep (susupti): (Note: Arvind Sharma, Sleep as a State of Consciousness in Advaita Vedånta. State University of New York Press) (Note: advaita.org.uk, ‘Om’ – three states and one reality (An interpretation of the Mandukya Upanishad))

- The first state is that of waking consciousness, in which we are aware of our daily world. "It is described as outward-knowing (bahish-prajnya), gross (sthula) and universal (vaishvanara)". This is the gross body.
- The second state is that of the dreaming mind. "It is described as inward-knowing (antah-prajnya), subtle (pravivikta), and burning (taijasa)". This is the subtle body.
- The third state is the state of deep sleep. In this state, the underlying ground of consciousness is undistracted. "[T]he Lord of all (sarv’-eshvara), the knower of all (sarva-jnya), the inner controller (antar-yami), the source of all (yonih sarvasya), the origin and dissolution of created things (prabhav-apyayau hi bhutanam)". This is the causal body.

Turiya is liberation, the autonomous realization of the non-causal Brahman beyond and underlying these three states.

== Kashmir Shaivism ==
Kashmir Shaivism holds the state called turya – the fourth state. It is neither wakefulness, dreaming, nor deep sleep. In reality, it exists in the junction between any of these three states, i.e. between waking and dreaming, between dreaming and deep sleep, and between deep sleep and waking. In Kashmir Shaivism there exists a fifth state of consciousness called Turiyatita - the state beyond Turiya. Turiyatita, also called the void or shunya is the state where one attains liberation otherwise known as jivanmukti or moksha.

Based on the Tantraloka an extended model of seven consecutive stages of turiya is presented by Swami Lakshman Joo. These stages are called:

1. Nijānanda
2. Nirānanda
3. Parānanda
4. Brahmānanda
5. Mahānanda
6. Chidānanda
7. Jagadānanda

While turiya stages 1 - 6 are attributed to the "internal subjective samādhi" (nimīlanā samādhi), once samādhi becomes permanently established in the seventh turiya stage it is described to span not only the internal subjective world anymore but beyond that also the whole external objective world (unimīlanā samādhi).

== See also ==
Hinduism

- Brahma Samhita
- Rasa (theology)
- Rasa lila
- Samādhi
- Shuddhadvaita

Buddhism

- Mindfulness
- Dhyana in Buddhism
- Shikan-taza
- Mahamudra
- Dzogchen
- Sunyata
- Buddha-nature
- Two truths doctrine

Cross-over

- Choiceless awareness

Therapy

- Morita therapy
- Gestalt therapy
- Acceptance and commitment therapy

== Sources ==
Printed sources

- Comans, Michael (2000). The Method of Early Advaita Vedānta: A Study of Gauḍapāda, Śaṅkara, Sureśvara, and Padmapāda. Delhi: Motilal Banarsidass.
- Goldberg, Ellen (2002), Ardhanarishvara: The Lord who is Half Woman
- Gupta, Bina (1998). The Disinterested Witness: A Fragment of Advaita Vedānta Phenomenology. Northwestern University Press. ISBN 978-0-8101-1565-1.
- Hume, Robert Ernest (1921), The Thirteen Principal Upanishads, Oxford University Press
- Indisch, William Martin (2000), Consciousness in Advaita Vedānta, Motilal Banarsidass Publishers
- Isaeva, Natalia (1993). Shankara and Indian Philosophy. Albany: State University of New York Press (SUNY). ISBN 978-0-7914-1281-7. Some editions spell the author Isayeva.
- King, Richard (1995), Early Advaita Vedanta and Buddhism: The Mahayana Context of the Gaudapadiya-Karika, SUNY Press
- Nakamura, Hajime (2004), A History of Early Vedanta Philosophy. Part Two, Delhi: Motilal Banarsidass Publishers Private Limited
- Olivelle, Patrick (1998). Upaniṣads. Oxford University Press. ISBN 978-0-19-283576-5.
- Olivelle, Patrick (2008). Upaniṣads. Oxford University Press. ISBN 978-0-19-954025-9.
- Potter, Karl. H. (1981), Encyclopedia of Indian Philosophies: Advaita Vedānta up to Śaṃkara and his pupils, Volume 3, Delhi: Motilal Banarsidass, ISBN 81-208-0310-8
- Raju, P.T. (1985), Structural Depths of Indian Thought, State University New York Press, ISBN 978-0887061394
- Sarma, Chandradhar (1996), The Advaita Tradition in Indian Philosophy: A Study of Advaita in Buddhism, Vedanta and Kashmira Shaivism
- Sharma, C. (1997). A Critical Survey of Indian Philosophy. Delhi: Motilal Banarsidass. ISBN 81-208-0365-5.
- Sullivan, Bruce M. (1997). Historical Dictionary of Hinduism. Scarecrow. ISBN 978-0-8108-3327-2.

Web-sources
