= Anugita =

Ancient Sanskrit text

The Anugita is an ancient Sanskrit text embedded in the Book 14 (Ashvamedhika Parva) of the Hindu epic the Mahabharata. The original was likely composed between 400 BCE and 200 CE, but its versions probably modified through about the 15th- or 16th-century. It is regarded by Hindus as an appendix to the Bhagavad Gita found in Book 6. Like it, the Anugita is one of the treatises on Dharma (ethics, moral precepts). Anugita is, in part, a retelling of some of the ethical premises of the Bhagavad Gita through legends and fables, instead of the distilled philosophy found in the Bhagavad Gita.

== Etymology ==
Anugita literally means an Anu ("continuation, alongside, subordinate to") of Gita.

== Contents ==
It contains a summary by Vaisampayana who heard and remembered Krishna's conversation with Arjuna after the Mahabharata war is over. They discuss various topics on ethics and morality, as well as the nature of existence. It is one of the numerous such dialogues and debates found in the Mahabharata. The text, consisting of thirty six chapters (from XVI to LI) of its Book 14, contains many of theories found in the ancient Mukhya Upanishads. For example:

- A discussion between a Brahmana husband and his wife on the nature of human body, rebirth and emancipation; the husband states that all deities are within the human body.
- A dialogue between Adhvaryu and an ascetic on animal sacrifice, that the proper sacrifice is not ritualistic but internal, of concentration of mind for the fire of knowledge;
- A dialogue between a student and teacher about the highest truth;
- A dialogue on just war theory, on when, how and why someone committed to ahimsa (non-violence) must use violence to prevent persistent violence and adharma.

The Anugita contains sections on what constitutes the duties of a good human being. For example, in chapter 23, it states the best quality and the duties of the good are:

Joy, pleasure, nobility, enlightenment and happiness also, absence of stinginess, absence of fear, contentment, faith, forgiveness, courage, harmlessness (ahimsa), equability, truth, straight forwardness, absence of wrath (akrodha), absence of caluminiation, purity, dexterity, valor. (...) Devoid of the notion that this or that is mine, devoid of egoism, devoid of expectations, equable everywhere, not full of desires, to be such is eternal duty of the good.

— Anugita, Translator: Kashinath Trimbak Telang

== Versions ==
The Anugita exists in many versions, with 36 or less chapters, with many chapters containing overlapping content. The original is probably ancient, but the text was edited, revised, interpolated and re-organized into chapters over its history. According to F.E. Hall, states Telang, the extant north Indian version was in all probability revised in or after the 16th-century CE. The parts and terms related to castes and confusing changes in fables in some manuscripts, for example states Telang, are late medieval era interpolations.

== Significance ==
The Anugita is considered significant because the original's ideas and ethical point of views are cited by scholars of different schools of Hindu philosophy such as the early 8th-century Adi Shankara and 15th-century Vijnanabhiksu. Scholars have discussed whether the ethical theories in Anugita were influenced by Buddhism or Jainism, or their theories borrowed from Anugita. According to Max Muller, though similar, given the evidence and the details of their respective theories, it is impossible to state either.

Anugita is generally believed by scholars to be likely a much later addition to the Mahabharata, than the ancient Bhagavad Gita, and that the teachings between the two texts are quite different in their details and the philosophical foundations.
