= Mandukya Upanishad =

Ancient Sanskrit scripture

Mandukya
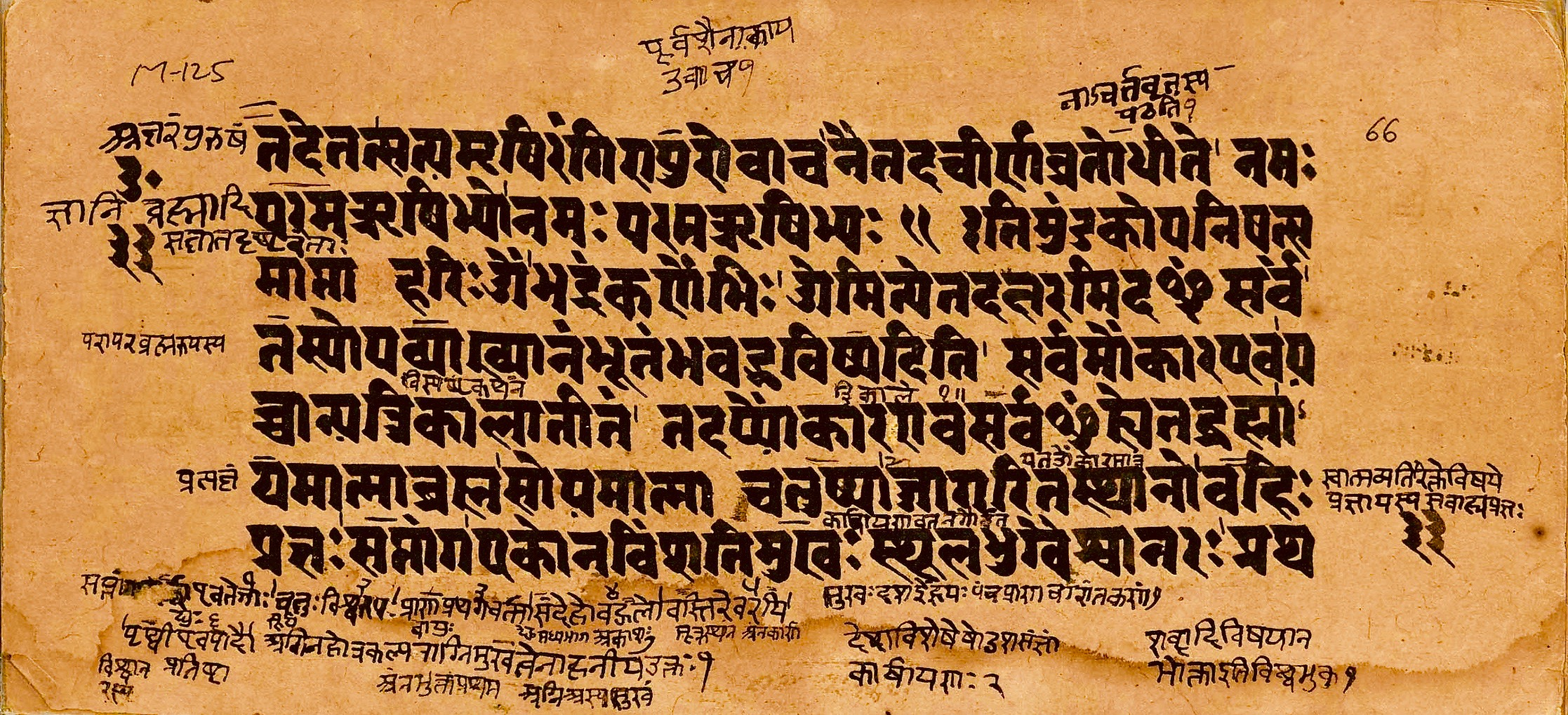
- Mandukya Upanisad verses 1 to 3 (Sanskrit, Devanagari script)
- Devanagari: माण्डूक्य
- IAST: Māṇḍūkya
- Type: Mukhya Upanishad
- Linked Veda: Atharvaveda
- Verses: 12
- Commented by: Gaudapada, Adi Shankara, Madhvacharya

The Mandukya Upanishad (Sanskrit: माण्डूक्योपनिषद्, IAST: Māṇḍūkyopaniṣad) is the shortest of all the Upanishads, and is assigned to Atharvaveda. It is listed as number 6 in the Muktikā canon of 108 Upanishads.

It is in prose, consisting of twelve short verses, and is associated with a Rig Vedic school of scholars. It discusses the syllable Aum; adds turiya to the three states of consciousness; and asserts that Aum is Brahman – which is the Whole – and that Brahman is this self (ātman).

The Mandukya Upanishad is recommended in the Muktikā Upanishad, in a dialogue between two of the most important characters of the Ramayana, Rama and Hanuman, as the one Upanishad that alone is sufficient for knowledge to gain moksha, and as sixth in its list of ten principal Upanishads. The text is also notable for inspiring Gaudapada's Mandukya Karika a classic for the Vedanta school of Hinduism. The Mandukya Upanishad is among the often cited texts on chronology and the philosophical relationship between Hinduism and Buddhism.

== Etymology ==
The root of Mandukya is sometimes considered as Manduka (Sanskrit: मण्डूक) which has several meanings. Some of its meanings include "frog", "a particular breed of horse", "the sole of horse's hoof", or, "Spiritual distress" Some writers have suggested that "frog" is the etymological root for Mandukya Upanishad.

Another root for the Upanishad's name is Mānduka (Sanskrit: माण्डूक) which literally is "a Vedic school" or means "a teacher". Paul Deussen states the etymological roots of Mandukya Upanishad to be a "half lost school of Rigveda". This school may be related to the scholar named Hrasva Māṇḍūkeya, whose theory of semivowels is discussed in Aitareya Aranyaka of Rigveda.

Applying the rules of sandhi, the text is also called Mandukyopanishad.

== Chronology and authorship ==
=== Chronology ===
The chronology of Mandukya Upanishad, like that of other Upanishads, is uncertain and contested. The chronology is difficult to resolve because all opinions rest on scanty evidence, an analysis of archaism, style and repetitions across texts, driven by assumptions about likely evolution of ideas, and on presumptions about which philosophy might have influenced which other Indian philosophies.

Several academics have dated the Mandukya Upanishad to the early centuries of the Common Era. The Japanese scholar of Vedic, Hindu and Buddhist scriptures, Hajime Nakamura, dated the Mandukya Upanishad to "about the first or second centuries A.D." The scholar of South Asian religions, Richard E. King too dated the Mandukya Upanishad at the first two centuries of the Common Era. Indologist and Sanskrit scholar Patrick Olivelle states, "we have the two late prose Upanisads, the Prasna and the Mandukya, which cannot be much older than the beginning of the common era".

Mahony, (writing for the MacMillan Encyclopedia of Religion) on the other hand, states that Mandukya Upanishad probably emerged in the late fifth and early fourth centuries BCE, along with Prashna and Maitri Upanishads. Phillips lists Mandukya Upanishad before and about the time the Shvetashvatara Upanishad, the Maitri Upanishad, as well as the first Buddhist Pali and Jaina canonical texts were composed. R D Ranade posits a view similar to Phillips, placing Mandukya's chronological composition in the fifth, that is the last group of ancient Principal Upanishads.

=== Authorship ===
The text of the Mandukya Upanishad is fully incorporated in the Mandukya Karika, a commentary attributed to the 6th century CE Gaudapada, and is not known to exist independent of this commentary. Isaeva states that some scholars, including Paul Deussen, presumed that Gaudapada may be its author; however, there is no historical or textual evidence for this hypothesis. Scholars consider Mandukya Upanishad as a Principal Upanishad with more ancient origins.

== Structure ==
In contrast to the older Upanishads, the Mandukya Upanishad is very short, with clear and concise formulations. It has twelve short prose paragraphs.

== Contents ==
The Mandukya Upanishad is an important Upanishad in Hinduism, particularly to its Advaita Vedanta school. It succinctly presents several central doctrines, namely that "the universe is Brahman," "the Self (Atma) exists and is Brahman," and "the four states of consciousness". The Mandukya Upanishad also presents several theories about the syllable Aum, and that it symbolizes self.

=== Aum in the Mandukya Upanishad ===
The Mandukya Upanishad is one of several Upanishads that discuss the meaning and significance of the syllable Aum (Om).

The Mandukya Upanishad opens by declaring, "Aum!, this syllable is this whole world". Thereafter it presents various explanations and theories on what it means and signifies. This discussion is built on a structure of "four fourths" or "fourfold", derived from A + U + M + "silence" (or without an element).

Aum as all states of time

In verse 1, the Upanishad states that time is threefold: the past, the present and the future, that these three are "Aum". The four fourth of time is that which transcends time, that too is "Aum" expressed.

Aum as all states of Atman

In verse 2, states the Upanishad, "this brahman is the Whole. Brahman is this self (ātman); that [brahman] is this self (ātman), consisting of four corners."

Aum as all states of consciousness

In verses 3 to 6, the Mandukya Upanishad enumerates four states of consciousness: wakeful, dream, deep sleep and the state of ekatma (being one with Self, the oneness of Self). These four are A + U + M + "without an element" respectively.

Aum as all of etymological knowledge

In verses 9 to 12, the Mandukya Upanishad enumerates fourfold etymological roots of the syllable "Aum". It states that the first element of "Aum" is A, which is from Apti (obtaining, reaching) or from Adimatva (being first). The second element is U, which is from Utkarsa (exaltation) or from Ubhayatva (intermediateness). The third element is M, from Miti (erecting, constructing) or from Mi Minati, or apīti (annihilation). The fourth is without an element, without development, beyond the expanse of universe. In this way, states the Upanishad, the syllable Aum is the Atman (the self) indeed.

=== Three states of consciousness and the fourth ===
The Mandukya Upanishad describes three states of consciousness, namely waking (jågrat), dreaming (svapna), and deep sleep (suṣupti), (Note: Arvind Sharma, Sleep as a State of Consciousness in Advaita Vedånta. State University of New York Press) (Note: advaita.org.uk, Om – three states and one reality (An interpretation of the Mandukya Upanishad)) and 'the fourth', beyond and underlying these three states:

1. The first state is the waking state, in which we are aware of our daily world. "It is described as outward-knowing (bahish-prajnya), gross (sthula) and universal (vaishvanara)". This is the gross body.
2. The second state is the dreaming mind. "It is described as inward-knowing (antah-prajnya), subtle (pravivikta) and burning (taijasa)". This is the subtle body.
3. The third state is the state of deep sleep. In this state the underlying ground of consciousness is undistracted, "the Lord of all (sarv'-eshvara), the knower of all (sarva-jnya), the inner controller (antar-yami), the source of all (yonih sarvasya), the origin and dissolution of created things (prabhav'-apyayau hi bhutanam)". This is the causal body.
4. Turiya, "the fourth," is the background that underlies and transcends the three common states of consciousness. In this consciousness both absolute and relative, saguna brahman and Nirguna Brahman, are transcended. It is the true state of experience of the infinite (ananta) and non-different (advaita/abheda), free from the dualistic experience which results from the attempts to conceptualise ( vikalpa) reality. It is the state in which ajativada, non-origination, is apprehended.

According to Raju, the idea of four states of Atman as awake, dream-filled sleep, deep sleep, and the "original pure state" is "anticipated in chapters 8.7 through 8.12 of Chandogya Upanishad.

=== Theory and nature of Atman ===
The verses 3 through 7 discuss four states of Atman (Self).

Verse 3 of the Upanishad describes the first state of Self as outwardly cognitive with seven limbs, nineteen mouths, enjoying the gross, a state of Self common in all of human beings.

The Mandukya Upanishad, in verse 4, asserts the second state of Self as inwardly cognitive with seven limbs, nineteen mouths, enjoying the exquisite, a state of brilliant Self.

The Upanishad's verse 5 states the third state of Self as one without desire or anticipations, where pure conscience is his only mouth, where he is in unified cognition, enjoying the delight, a state of blissful Self.

The verses 6 and 7 of the Upanishad states the fourth state of Self as one beyond all the three, beyond extrospective state, beyond introspective state, beyond cognitive state, the state of ekatmya pratyaya sara (one with the Self), tranquil, benign, advaita (without second). He then is the Self, just Atman, the one which should be discerned.

Johnston summarizes these four states of Self, respectively, as seeking the physical, seeking inner thought, seeking the causes and spiritual consciousness, and the fourth state is realizing oneness with the Self, the Eternal.

== Similarities and differences with Buddhist teachings ==
Scholars contest whether Mandukya Upanishad was influenced by Buddhist theories along with the similarities and differences between Buddhism and Hinduism in light of the text. According to Hajime Nakamura, the Mandukya Upanishad was influenced by Mahayana Buddhism and its concept of śūnyatā. Nakamura states, "many particular Buddhist terms or uniquely Buddhist modes of expression may be found in it", (Note: Nakamura: "As was pointed out in detail in the section titled Interpretation, many particular Buddhist terms or uniquely Buddhist modes of expression may be found in it."; "From the fact that many Buddhist terms are found in its explanation, it is clear that this view was established under the influence of the Mahayana Buddhist concept of Void."; "Although Buddhistic influence can be seen in the Maitri-Upanishad, the particular terms and modes of expression of Mahayana Buddhism do not yet appear, whereas the influence of the Mahayana concept of Void can clearly be recognized in the Mandukya-Upanisad."; "Although Mahayana Buddhism strongly influenced this Upanisad, neither the mode of exposition of the Madhyamika school nor the characteristic terminology of the Vijnanavada school appears.") such as adrsta, avyavaharya, agrahya, alaksana, acintya, prapancopasama. According to Randall Collins the Mandukya Upanishad "includes phrases found in the Prajnaparamitrasutras of Mahayana Buddhism."

According to Michael Comans, Vidushekhara also notes that the term prapañcopaśama does not appear in pre-Buddhist Brahmanic works, but in contrast to Nakamura he does not conclude that the term was taken over from Mahayana Buddhism. According to Comans, eventual Mahayana origins of this term are no more than a possibility, and not a certainty.

Comans also disagrees with Nakamura's thesis that "the fourth realm (caturtha) was perhaps influenced by the Sunyata of Mahayana Buddhism." (Note: Nakamura, as cited in Comans 2000 p.98.) According to Comans,

It is impossible to see how the unequivocal teaching of a permanent, underlying reality, which is explicitly called the "Self", could show early Mahayana influence.

Comans further refers to Nakamura himself, who notes that later Mahayana sutras such as the Laṅkāvatāra Sūtra and the concept of Buddha-nature, were influenced by Vedantic thought. Comans concludes that

[T]here can be no suggestion that the teaching about the underlying Self as contained in the Mandukya contains shows any trace of Buddhist thought, as this teaching can be traced to the pre-Buddhist Brhadaranyaka Upanishad.

Jacobs lists adrsta and other terms in more ancient, pre-Buddhist literature such as the Brihadaranyaka Upanishad.

Isaeva states that there are differences in the teachings in the texts of Buddhism and the Mandukya Upanishad of Hinduism, because the latter asserts that citta "consciousness" is identical with the eternal and immutable atman "Self" of the Upanishads. In other words, Mandukya Upanishad and Gaudapada affirm the Self exists, while Buddhist schools affirm that there is no soul or self.

== Reception ==
=== Muktika Upanishad ===
Rama and Hanuman of the Hindu Epic Ramayana, in Muktika Upanishad, discuss moksha (freedom, liberation, deliverance). Rama, therein, recommends Mandukya as first among 108 Upanishads, as follows,

The Mandukya alone is sufficient
for the deliverance of the aspirant,
if even then, the knowledge lacks,
then read the ten Upanishads.

He attains the goal
if he reads the thirty two Upanishads,
if you just wish deliverance, while death is near,
read, then, the hundred and eight Upanishads.

— Muktika Upanishad I.i.26-29, Translated by Paul Deussen

=== Classical commentators ===
==== Gaudapada ====
The oldest known extant metrical commentary on this Upanishad was written by Gaudapada, This commentary, called the Māndūkya-kārikā, is the earliest known systematic exposition of Advaita Vedanta.

Raju states that Gaudapada took over the Buddhist doctrines that ultimate reality is pure consciousness (vijñapti-mātra), (Note: It is often used interchangeably with the term citta-mātra, but they have different meanings. The standard translation of both terms is "consciousness-only" or "mind-only." Several modern researchers object this translation, and the accompanying label of "absolute idealism" or "idealistic monism". A better translation for vijñapti-mātra is representation-only.) and "the four-cornered negation" (चतुष्कोटि विनिर्मुक्तः). (Note: 1. Something is. 2. It is not. 3. It both is and is not. 4. It neither is nor is not.) Raju further states that Gaudapada "weaved [both doctrines] into a philosophy of the Mandukaya Upanisad, which was further developed by Shankara". (Note: The influence of Mahayana Buddhism on other religions and philosophies was not limited to Vedanta. Kalupahana notes that the Visuddhimagga in Theravada Buddhism tradition contains "some metaphysical speculations, such as those of the Sarvastivadins, the Sautrantikas, and even the Yogacarins".) Other scholars such as Murti state, that while there is shared terminology, the doctrines of Gaudapada and Buddhism are fundamentally different. (Note: Gaudapada's doctrines are unlike Buddhism, states Murti. Gaudapada's influential Vedanta text consists of four chapters; Chapter One, Two and Three of which are entirely Vedantin and founded on the Upanishads, with little Buddhist flavor. Chapter Four uses Buddhist terminology and incorporates Buddhist doctrines, state both Murti and Richard King, but Vedanta scholars who followed Gaudapada through the 17th century never referenced nor used Chapter Four, they only quote from the first three.)

==== Adi Shankara ====
Adi Shankara, a disciple of Govinda Bhagavatpada who himself was either a direct or a distant disciple of Gaudapada, further made commentaries on Gaudapada Mandukya karika. Mandukya Upanishad forms one of the basis of Advaita Vedanta as expounded by Adi Shankara.

==== Madhvacharya ====
Madhvacharya, the propounder of Dvaita Vedanta, wrote commentaries on Mandukya Upanishad. He presents a theistic and emotional perspective on the scripture, attributing his insights to Śruti. His commentary emphasizes bhakti yoga and uses Vishnu and his attributes as similes to elucidate the verses of the Mandukya Upanishad.

Ranga Ramanuja

Ranga Ramanuja (also known as Rangaramanujamuni), a 17th-century Sri Vaishnava scholar following Ramanujacharya, wrote a commentary on the Mandukya Upanishad titled Prakasika. The commentary adopts a theistic framework, equating Brahman with Lord Vishnu and interpreting brahmaloka as Vaikuṇṭha. For the verse "He knows Brahman, he becomes Brahman" (Mu. Up. III, 2, 9), Ranga Ramanuja holds that the liberated soul manifests Brahman's attributes as being freed from all evil without becoming ontologically identical to Brahman.

=== Modern commentators ===
Swami Rama has provided an interpretation of this Upanishad from the experiential standpoint in his commentary Enlightenment without God.

Ramachandra Dattatrya Ranade calls the aphoristic style of Mandukya Upanishad as highly influential on the Sutras of Indian philosophies that followed it, and that the Upanishad has served as a foundational text of the major Vedanta school of Hinduism. He states,

We are told [in Mandukya Upanishad] how, "the syllable Om is verily all that exists. Under it is included all the past, the present and the future, as well as that which transcends time. Verily all this is Brahman. The Atman is Brahman. This Atman is four-footed. The first foot is the Vaisvanara, who enjoys gross things, in the state of wakefulness. The second foot is the Taijasa, who enjoys exquisite things in the state of dream. The third is the Prajna who enjoys bliss in the state of deep sleep. The fourth is Atman, who is alone without a second, calm, holy and tranquil". This passage has been verily the basis upon which all the later systems of Vedantic philosophy have come to be built.

— RD Ranade

Ranade's views on the importance of Mandukya Upanishad and Gaudapada's commentary on Vedanta school, particularly Advaita Vedanta sub-school of Hinduism, is shared by modern era scholars such as Hacker, Vetter and others.

Johnston states that Mandukya Upanishad must be read in two layers, consciousness and vehicles of consciousness, Self and nature of Self, the empirical and the eternal. The text aphoristically condenses these layers of message, both in literal and metaphorical sense.

William Butler Yeats, the Irish poet, was inspired by the Upanishads and Mandukya Upanishad was among the texts he commented on.

David Stoll's 1987 Piano Quartet is inspired by three Upanishads, one being Mandukya Upanishad, other two being Katha and Isha Upanishads.

== See also ==
- Gaudapada
- Adi Shankara
- Advaita
- Shri Gaudapadacharya Mutt
- Govinda Bhagavatpada

== Sources ==
=== Published sources ===
- Collins, Randall (2009), The Sociology of Philosophies, Harvard University Press
- Comans, Michael (2000), The Method of Early Advaita Vedānta: A Study of Gauḍapāda, Śaṅkara, Sureśvara, and Padmapāda, Motilal Banarsidass Publ.
- Garfield, Jay L.; Priest, Graham (January 2003), "Nagarjuna and the Limits of Thought" (PDF), Philosophy East & West, 53 (1): 1–21, doi:10.1353/pew.2003.0004, hdl:11343/25880, S2CID 16724176
- Isaeva, N.V. (1993), Shankara and Indian Philosophy, SUNY Press
- Kalupahana, David J. (1994), A history of Buddhist philosophy, Delhi: Motilal Banarsidass Publishers Private Limited
- King, Richard (1995), Early Advaita Vedānta and Buddhism: The Mahāyāna Context of the Gauḍapādīya-kārikā, SUNY Press
- Kochumuttom, Thomas A. (1999), A buddhist Doctrine of Experience. A New Translation and Interpretation of the Works of Vasubandhu the Yogacarin, Delhi: Motilal Banarsidass
- Mahony, William K. (1987), "Upanisads", in Jones, Lindsay (ed.), MacMillan Encyclopedia of Religion (2005), MacMillan
- Nakamura, Hajime (2004), A History of Early Vedānta Philosophy, Part 2, Motilal Banarsidass Publ.
- Olivelle, Patrick (1998), The Early Upanishads, Oxford University Press
- Raju, P.T. (1992), The Philosophical Traditions of India, Delhi: Motilal Banarsidass Publishers Private Limited
- Sarma, Chandradhar (1996), The Advaita Tradition in Indian Philosophy, Delhi: Motilal Banarsidass
- Rama, Swami (1982), Enlightenment Without God, Honesdale, Pennsylvania, USA: The Himalayan International Institute of Yoga Science and Philosophy
- Rama, Swami (2007), OM the Eternal Witness: Secrets of the Mandukya Upanishad (Prakash Keshaviah PHD ed.), India: Himalaya Institute hospital trust, ISBN 978-81-88157-43-3
- Mishra, Dr. Suryamani (2016), Ishadi Nau Upnishad - Hindi Translated, Chintan Prakashan, ISBN 978-93-85804-16-8
