= Vaishvanara =

In Hinduism, Vaishvanara (Sanskrit: वैश्वानर, pronounced [ʋaiɕʋaːnɐɽɐ]), meaning "of or related to Visvanara" is an abstract concept. It is related to the soul Atma of human beings and Paramatma (The Supersoul). Etymologically, Vaishvanara is a derivative of the conjoined word Vishvanara i.e. Vishva (Universe) + Narah (Man) i.e. the 'Universal or Cosmic Man'. In the Rig Veda, Vaishvanara is an epithet of the fire god deity Agni.

Bhagavan Krishna in the Bhagavad Gita 15.14 says that he is Vaishvanara Agni in the living beings responsible for digesting the eaten food of the living beings.

== Forms of Vaishvanara ==
As per the Mandukya Upanishad, the Self has four aspects or states of consciousness. The first is the Vaishvanara manifestation, under the jagrat or the waking state which is outwardly cognitive. The Self in Vaishvanara form has seven limbs, nineteen mouths and has the capability to experience material objects.

The seven limbs of Vaishvanara pertain to the 'cosmic body' of 'Vaishvanara'. These are enumerated in verse 18.2 of the Chandogya Upanishad,

[T]he heavens are his head, the sun his eyes, the air his breath, the fire his heart, the water his stomach, the earth his feet, and space his body.

The seven limbs of Vaishvanara have also referred to in the first verse of the Mandukya Upanishad, which have been described to encompass the entire manifest universe. The nineteen "mouths" are:

- The five sense organs
- The five organs of action (walking, talking, expelling, procreating, and handling)
- The five pranas
- The four functions of mind (aspects of antahkarana) - the mind (manas), the intellect (buddhi), the ego sense (ahamkara), and thought (çitta)

Further, Agni Vaishvanara is regarded as Author of the Hymns of the Rig-veda (x. 79, 80).

Agning prajvalitang vande Jata-vedang Hutashanang:
Suvarna-varnam amalang samiddhang sarvvatomukham.

The Mahanirvana Tantra also refers to certain Vaishvanara:

[O]m Vaishvanara Jataveda ihavaha ihavaha;
lohitaksha, sarvva-karmani sadhaya: svaha.

As per the Tantras, Vaishvanara meaning "Ruling or benefiting all men," is also a name of the tantric goddess Savitri.

== See also ==
- Brahman
- Glossary of Hinduism terms
- Hindu deities
- Hindu mythology
