= Akshara =

Hindu philosophical concept

An akshara (Sanskrit: अक्षर, romanized: akṣara, lit. 'imperishable, indestructible, fixed, immutable') is a consonant letter together with any vowel diacritics in a Brahmic script. It is a term used in the traditional grammar of the Sanskrit language and in the Vedanta school of Indian philosophy.

== Etymology ==
The term derives from अ, a- "not" and क्षर्, kṣar- "melt away, perish." While its use in the mystical view of language (shabda) denotes the syllable as an immutable substance—most prominently in the mystical syllable Aum (ekākṣara)—the term also evolved into a specific technical metaphysical designation for "the Immutable" or "the abode".

In this technical sense, particularly within the Bhagavad Gita and early metrical Upanishads, akṣara represents the conscious "Higher Nature" or "Matrix" (yoni) of the universe, acting as the eternal power (śakti) of the Supreme Person (puruṣa).

This principle is fundamentally contrasted with the kṣara, or the perishable material world, and is often used synonymously with Brahman, Avyakta (the Unmanifest), and Kutastha (Kūṭastha) (the unchanging) to describe a spiritual principle that is eternal and immutable, yet subordinate to the Supreme Divine as His essential dwelling place or power.

== Grammatical tradition ==
The akshara is the unit of graphemic symbols in the Brahmic scripts. An akshara is a syllable-like unit for writing which requires the knowledge of syllables and the matra, i.e. the measure of prosodic marking. In writing it prototypically stands for CV, CVV, CCV, CCVV, CCCV, CCCVV, V and VV where "C" stands for a consonant, "V" for a vowel and "VV" for a long vowel. It is usually a sub-syllabic representation which stands for onset, onset plus nucleus and nucleus alone; the coda part of a syllable goes into the next akshara in a word.

Its nature favours the phonological mediation i.e. the non-lexical strategy of reading, which may be interpreted in stages such as the "Visual Analysis System" and proceeding to the "Aksara Recognition System" and then to the "Aksara sound Conversion System" and the "Phonological Assembly System" before ending with the "Response Buffer" prior to reading aloud.

== Vedanta ==
As part of basic instructions of Shiksha and Sanskrit grammar, it is explained that among the word-entities, both, Aksara and Brahman stand out as especially important because both refer to a special form of ritual word. In the Brahmanas and the Upanishads both come to mean the absolute. Aksara is a part of the sacred word "Om" and possesses a unique and intensified power and dignity. In the Upanishads, in a condensed and intensified form, it signifies the transcendent principle of all that exists. Its significance is derived from its role as a "syllable", the essential and embryonic core of speech.

The Vedanta School, specifically as formulated in the Brahma Sūtras, was established to reconcile these diverse scriptural doctrines and oppose "hostile" systems like classical Sāṃkhya. The Sūtrakāra (author of the Sūtras) restored a form of Advaitism by discriminating between the names and functions of akṣara and puruṣa while maintaining their ultimate unity in a single goal. This system allows for the meditation on both principles, viewing akṣara as the formless, impersonal aspect and puruṣa as the presiding deity.

=== Brihadaranyaka Upanishad ===
The eighth brahmana of the Brihadaranyaka Upanishad focuses on the concept of the imperishable (akshara). Verse 3.8.8-9 describe akshara having certain qualities. It is neither physical nor subtle, and it is not defined by physical characteristics such as size, length, or physical traits like blood or fat. It exists beyond shadows, darkness, air, and space, untouched by sensory experiences like taste, smell, sight, or hearing. It does not possess attributes like speech, mind, energy, breath, and form. Akshara is immeasurable, existing without internal or external elements, and is neither a consumer nor consumed. Akshara governs the universe and influences various aspects of existence including the sun, moon, earth, sky, time, rivers, human behavior, and the dependence of gods and ancestors on ritual offerings. Verse 3.8.10 emphasizes the significance of understanding this imperishable:

यो वा एतदक्षरं गार्ग्यविदित्वास्माल्लोकात्प्रैति स कृपणोऽथ य एतदक्षरं गार्गि विदित्वास्माल्लोकात्प्रैति स ब्राह्मणः॥ ||१०||

Without knowing this imperishable, Gargi, even if a man were to make offerings, to offer sacrifices, and to perform austerities in this world for many thousands of years, all that would come to naught. Pitiful is the man, Gargi, who departs from this world without knowing this imperishable.

— Brihadaranyaka Upanishad, Chapter 3, Brahmanam 8, Hymn 10

=== Mandukya Upanishad ===
The Mandukya Upanishad (Māṇḍukya Upaniṣad) divides the syllable Aum into three morae (sound units) and a fourth, silent part, known as turiya. It teaches that only the silent part, beyond the three states of consciousness (wakefulness, dream, and deep sleep), is ultimately real. This silent part, linked to akshara, corresponds to Atman, the eternal self.

In Mundaka Upanishad verses 1.1.3-7, Aksara is discussed in the context of the higher knowledge. The lower knowledge (apara vidya) includes knowledge of four Vedas, phonetics, grammar, etymology, meter, astrology, and the knowledge of sacrifices and rituals. The higher knowledge (para vidya) is the means by which one can comprehend the imperishable (Aksara, Brahman).

अथ परा यया तदक्षरमधिगम्यते ॥ ||५||

But the higher knowledge is that through which that imperishable one (aksaram) is known

— Mundaka Upanishad, 1.1.5

Madhavananda, in his commentary on the Brahmopanishad belonging to the Atharvaveda, explains that, as per the Mundaka Upanishad I.7 and II.1-2, the term Aksara signifies Brahman in Its aspect of the manifesting principle. Pippalada suggests that this manifesting Brahman is the thread (Sutram) to be worn instead of the sacrificial thread on the body which should be discarded.

=== Bhagavad Gita ===
Aksara means one who is present everywhere, denotes the name of Shiva and Vishnu, and also that of Brahman, literally it means imperishable, indestructible. Every ritual and fire offering detailed in the Veda is impermanent. In contrast, the term Aum remains everlasting and is called Aksara, the symbol of God, who is the lord of all created things. It is a descriptive synonym of Brahman (Bhagavad Gita VIII.3), who is said to have arisen from Aksara (Bhagavad Gita III.15).

With regard to Vallabha’s view of Aum it is said that Aksara itself is imperishable and appears as souls endowed with Sat and Chit but not as Ananda. For Vallabha, Ananda, which is the first manifestation of God, is the actualisation of the absolute identity and selfness, whereas the second manifestation of God is the Aksara, the impersonal ground from which all determinations arise because it is the substratum of all finite forms that pre-exist but issue forth from it which though by itself is the intermediate form that lacks plenitude.

In verses 15.16 and 15.17, Purushottam is explained as being above kshar and akshar. There are two types of beings within the world: kshar and akshar. All those bound by maya are kshar, whereas the one who is unchanging - forever beyond maya - is akshar. The supreme being is distinct from kshar and akshar. He is called Paramatman.

Akṣara as the abode: The Gita describes the akṣara as the "Abode" (dhāman) or "Place" (pada) of the supreme being. It is the immutable foundation or matrix (yoni) that is ruled by the Lord.

The three principles: In chapter XV (16–18), the Gita enumerates a triad: the kshara (the perishable material world), the akshara (the unchanging spiritual principle), and the Purushottama (the supreme person). The Purushottama is explicitly stated to be beyond both the perishable and the imperishable.

Identification of Krishna: Throughout the text, Krishna is identified with the purusha, the supreme divine, and notably not with the impersonal Brahman or Akshara, which is merely his "foundation" (pratiṣṭhā).
