= Vichara =

Indian philosophy concept

Vichāra (Pāli: vicāra) in Indian philosophy means deliberation; it is the faculty of discrimination that discerns the Real, Brahman, from the unreal.

== Etymology ==
Vichāra (Sanskrit: विचार) means deliberation; its root is वि (a prefix) – चर् (to move, roam, obtain knowledge of).

It is the faculty of discrimination between right and wrong; it is deliberation about cause and effect, and the final analysis.

The Sanskrit word, Vichāra, does not have a corresponding word in English.

== Textual references ==
Aitareya Aranyaka (II.iii.2.5) of the Rig Veda tells us that in man alone is the Atman ('Self') most manifest, for man is best endowed with intelligence and discrimination, and who knowing the higher and the lower worlds aspires to achieve immortality through mental things. Taittiriya Upanishad tells us:-

यो वेद निहितं गुहाया परमे व्योमन् |

that all should know Brahman as existing in the intellect in which, Shankara explains, are hidden – a) 'knowledge', b) 'the knowable' and c) 'the knower', as also enjoyment and liberation. The relationship between the Individual self and the Universal Self reveals the actual source of thought and action; it reveals Brahman; vichāra (reflection and contemplation) results in disinterest in that which is not the source of anything in this world.

One interpretation of vichāra from an Advaita perspective is that it increases viveka ('discrimination') to deconstruct vivarta ('false superimposition') to destroy vasanas ('root desires') and thus establish vairagya ('detachment'), become a vidvan ('wise person') and attain vijnana ('self-realization'); these factors combined facilitate in the human aspiration and Divine Dispensation working harmoniously together. Vichāra is Atma-vichāra in Advaita Vedanta, but Samkhya is more concerned with Tattva-vichāra, about the nature of the tattvas.

== Interpretation ==
Vichāra is reflection and contemplation upon the meaning of Vedantic truths, and leads the individual to true knowledge, it leads to Brahman, the Universal Self. It is also the enquiry into the nature of the Atman, Satya, Ishvara and Brahman.

=== Vedanta ===
Vichāra or discriminating reasoning is one of the five Vedanta methods for awakening spiritual consciousness. Contrary to faith, which is concerned primarily with the essence of a thing and not merely with its appearance; reason, which begins with doubt, relies on appearance of things and not on their essential nature. There are three types of reasoning – vada or academic reasoning, jalpa or reasoning in a dogmatic and negative way whether rationally or irrationally, and vitanda or reasoning that seeks only to lay bare defects of or confuse the opponents.

In Vedanta, rational reasoning is vichāra that discriminates between the real and the unreal; it dispels prejudices such as irrational doubts, preconceived notions/ideas and personal sentiments to scrutinize the meaning of Truth. Shankara in his commentary on the Mandukya Upanishad explains that Vedantic reasoning reveals the essential meaning of scriptural statement in the context of its goal, proves the logical untenability of all contrary concepts so as to establish the intelligibility of non-dualism and expose the mutually contradictory nature of dualistic views about Reality. The process of Vedantic reasoning is three-fold viz; through shravana, manana and nididhyasana, with the aspirant, endowed with shraddha, reasoning with an open mind.

=== Atma-vichara ===
Vichara, Self-inquiry, also called jnana-vichara or ātma-vichār by devotees of Ramana Maharshi, is the constant attention to the inner awareness of 'I' or 'I am'. It was recommended by Ramana Maharshi as the most efficient and direct way of discovering the unreality of the ‘I'-thought, and then discovering one's identity with its source.

According to David Frawley, "atma-vichara" is the most important practice in the Advaita Vedanta tradition, predating its popularisation by Ramana Maharshi. (Note: David Frawley, Self-Inquiry and Its Practice) It is part of the eighth limb of Patanjali's Yoga Sutras, which describes the various stages of samadhi. Meditation on "I-am-ness" is a subtle object of meditation. It is also described in the Yoga Vasistha, a syncretic work which may date from the 6th or 7th century CE, and shows influences from Yoga, Samkhya, Saiva Siddhanta and Mahayana Buddhism, especially Yogacara.

Ramana taught that the 'I'-thought will disappear and only "I-I" (Note: David Godman (1991), 'I' and 'I-I' — A Reader's Query, The Mountain Path, 1991, pp. 79–88. Part one) or Self-awareness remains. This results in an "effortless awareness of being", and by staying with it (Note: David Godman (23 June 2008), More on Bhagavan's death experience) this "I-I" gradually destroys the vasanas "which cause the 'I'-thought to rise," and finally the 'I'-thought never rises again, which is Self-realization or liberation.

=== Yoga Sutras of Patanjali ===
In the Yoga Sutras of Patanjali, Samprajnata Samadhi, also called savikalpa samadhi and Sabija Samadhi, (Note: Swami Sivananda, Samprajnata Samadhi) (Note: The seeds or samskaras are not destroyed.) is meditation with support of an object. (Note: Swami Jnaneshvara Bharati, Integrating 50+ Varieties of Yoga Meditation) (Note: According to Jianxin Li Samprajnata Samadhi may be compared to the rupa jhanas of Buddhism. This interpretation may conflict with Gombrich and Wynne, according to whom the first and second jhana represent concentration, whereas the third and fourth jhana combine concentration with mindfulness. According to Eddie Crangle, the first jhana resembles Patnajali's Samprajnata Samadhi, which both share the application of vitarka and vicara.) Samprajata samadhi is associated with deliberation, reflection, bliss, and I-am-ness. (Note: Yoga Sutra 1.17: "Objective samadhi (samprajnata) is associated with deliberation, reflection, bliss, and I-am-ness (asmita).) Deliberation and reflection form the basis of the various types of samapatti:

- Savitarka, "deliberative": (Note: Yoga Sutra 1.42: "Deliberative (savitarka) samapatti is that samadhi in which words, objects, and knowledge are commingled through conceptualization.") The citta is concentrated upon a gross object of meditation, an object with a manifest appearance that is perceptible to our senses, such as a flame of a lamp, the tip of the nose, or the image of a deity. Conceptualization (vikalpa) still takes place, in the form of perception, the word and the knowledge of the object of meditation. When the deliberation is ended this is called nirvitaka samadhi. (Note: Yoga Sutra 1.43: "When memory is purified, the mind appears to be emptied of its own nature and only the object shines forth. This is superdeliberative (nirvitaka) samapatti.")
- Savichara, "reflective": the citta is concentrated upon a subtle object of meditation, which is not perceptible to the senses, but arrived at through interference, such as the senses, the process of cognition, the mind, the I-am-ness, (Note: Following Yoga Sutra 1.17, meditation on the sense of "I-am-ness" is also grouped, in other descriptions, as "sasmita samapatti") the chakras, the inner-breath (prana), the nadis, the intellect (buddhi). The stilling of reflection is called nirvichara samapatti. (Note: Yoga Sutra 1.44: "In this way, reflective (savichara) and super-reflective (nirvichara) samapatti, which are based on subtle objects, are also explained.")

== Sources ==
=== Printed sources ===
- Apte, V.S. (1890; rev. ed. 1957-59), The practical Sanskrit-English dictionary. (Poona: Prasad Prakashan).
- Chapple, Christopher (1984), Introduction to "The Concise Yoga Vasistha", State University of New York
- Crangle, Eddie (1984), "A Comparison of Hindu and Buddhist Techniques of Attaining Samādhi" (PDF), in Hutch, R.A.; Fenner, P.G. (eds.), Under The Shade of the Coolibah Tree: Australian Studies in Consciousness, University Press of America, archived from the original (PDF) on 1 September 2021
- Crangle, Edward Fitzpatrick (1994), The Origin and Development of Early Indian Contemplative Practices, Otto Harrassowitz Verlag
- Sadhu Om (2005), The Path of Sri Ramana, Part One (PDF), Tiruvannamalai: Sri Ramana Kshetra, Kanvashrama
- Jianxin Li (n.d.), A Comparative Study between Yoga and Indian Buddhism, asianscholarship.org, archived from the original on 2016-03-04
- Maehle, Gregor (2007), Ashtanga Yoga: Practice and Philosophy, New World Library
- Whicher, Ian (1998), The Integrity of the Yoga Darsana: A Reconsideration of Classical Yoga, SUNY Press
- Wynne, Alexander (2007), The Origin of Buddhist Meditation, Routledge
