= Para Vidya =

Practice in Hindu philosophy

Parā Vidyā (Sanskrit: परा विद्या) is a combination of two words – parā, in Hindu philosophy, means - existence, paramount object, the highest point or degree, final beatitude; and vidyā means - knowledge, philosophy, science, learning, scholarship. Para Vidya means – higher learning or learning related to the Self or the Ultimate Truth i.e. transcendental knowledge. Vedanta affirms that those who gain the knowledge of the Self attain kaivalya, they become liberated, they become Brahman.

Saunaka, having asked – कस्मिन्नु भगवो विज्ञाते सर्वमिदं विज्ञातं भवतीति (" Revered Sir, what is that by the knowing of which all this becomes known? "), - was told by Angiras:

द्वे विद्ये वेदितव्ये इति ह् स्म यद्ब्रह्मविदो वदन्ति परा चैवापरा च |
तत्रापरा ऋग्वेदो यजुर्वेदः सामवेदोऽथर्ववेदः शिक्षा कल्पो व्याकरणं निरुक्तं छन्दो ज्योतिषमिति |
अथ परा यया तदक्षरमधिग्म्यते || - (Mundaka Upanishad I.1.3-5)

There are two different kinds of knowledge to be acquired – 'the higher knowledge' or Para Vidya (Sanskrit: परा विद्या )and 'the lower knowledge' or Apara Vidya. The lower knowledge consists of all textual knowledge - the four Vedas, the science of pronunciation etc., the code of rituals, grammar, etymology, metre and astrology. The higher knowledge is that by which the immutable and imperishable Atman is realized, and this knowledge brings about the direct realization of the Supreme Reality, the source of All. The knowledge of the Atman is very subtle; it cannot be obtained out of one's own effort; the Atman cannot be intuitively apprehended by mere intellectual equipments. Thus, Angiras draws the distinction between the way of knowledge and the way of realization, as between opinion and truth. To understand and realize the Reality, the aspirant must seek a spiritual teacher (Guru). Only a spiritual teacher who has already realized his identity with the Atman can impart this much sought-after wisdom based on his own experiences.

A human being is blessed with the faculty of self-knowledge which is Apara Vidya or logical reasoning and also with the faculty of understanding and self-awareness which is Para Vidya. Para Vidya is defined as the intuitive vision of non-duality; it is the transcendental knowledge which is beyond all limits of knowledge, experience and reason, which is, beyond intellect, mind and sense. The Absolute, which is Truth, which is Reality, is neither an expression nor a reflection of itself; it is non-dual being devoid of otherness, and it cannot be an object of knowledge in the ordinary sense as it surpasses the intellect in subtleness. Knowledge is truth and truth is correspondence of an apprehension with its object. It is the intellect which moves within the sphere of duality resulting in delusion, wrong identification etc. Para Vidya is the intuitive level of vidya that stems from a unity, and manifests as a vision, manifests as an experience.

The vision of the Nirguna Brahman is gained through Para Vidya, it is the highest of all knowledge. The method of self-realization involves sravana , manana and nididhyasana , and not rituals. Para Vidya is samyagdarcanam, the pure philosophic esoteric doctrine which teaches that Brahman is without attributes (gunas), without any distinction (vicesha) and without limitations (upadhis), that it undefinable, alone and without a second. Reality is incapable of increase; it does not change into anything else. When the true identity becomes known then the existence of the transmigrating soul and of Brahman as the creator, both vanish.

Para Vidya, concerned with Brahman, the highest reality and value, and the final terminus, cannot be conceived as an inquiry; all scientific and ethical inquiries are Apara Vidya, nevertheless, the scientists engaged in such inquiries not only guide the selection of means to an end but also guide choice of the ends.

Vedanta deals with the transition from avidya to vidya, that is, from the imagined life to the life of true perception. Maya is avidya. Vidya is tattvavidya, the knowledge of reality as it is in itself. Apara Vidya is rooted in "adhyasa" and "ignorance", Para Vidya is transcendent of the Apara Vidya and aims at realizing Reality as it is and not as it appears, and it supplants and corrects conventional knowledge and conventional belief, both. Shankara's concept of adhyasa involves the logical interpretation of the vedic vakyas. He explains that all epistemic, practical and socio-cultural distinctions are based on the mis-identification of the self as non-self (anatman) and of the non-self as the self. Para Vidya is absolute knowledge. Avidya lapses into Apara vidya, and again into Para Vidya. Avidya, Apara Vidya and Paravya are three fold phases of experience, the three transitions in knowledge of the transforming cognizer. Para Vidya alone is pramarthika jnana beyond all illusory appearances.

Para Vidya is the knowledge of the Absolute whereas Apara Vidya is the knowledge of the world; the former has Reality as its content and possesses a unique quality of ultimacy which is singular and free from reason, senses, etc., but the latter has the phenomenal world as its content. Para Vidya does not require any support or proof, and is irrefutable.

The aim of integral education is to integrate all dichotomies, to integrate the material and spiritual dimensions of the human personality; it does not recognize the description of vidya as Para Vidya (higher spiritual knowledge) and Apara Vidya (the knowledge of the senses and the surface mind) because the latter without the light and influence of the former is avidya or false knowledge.
