= Self-enquiry (Ramana Maharshi) =

Psychological technique

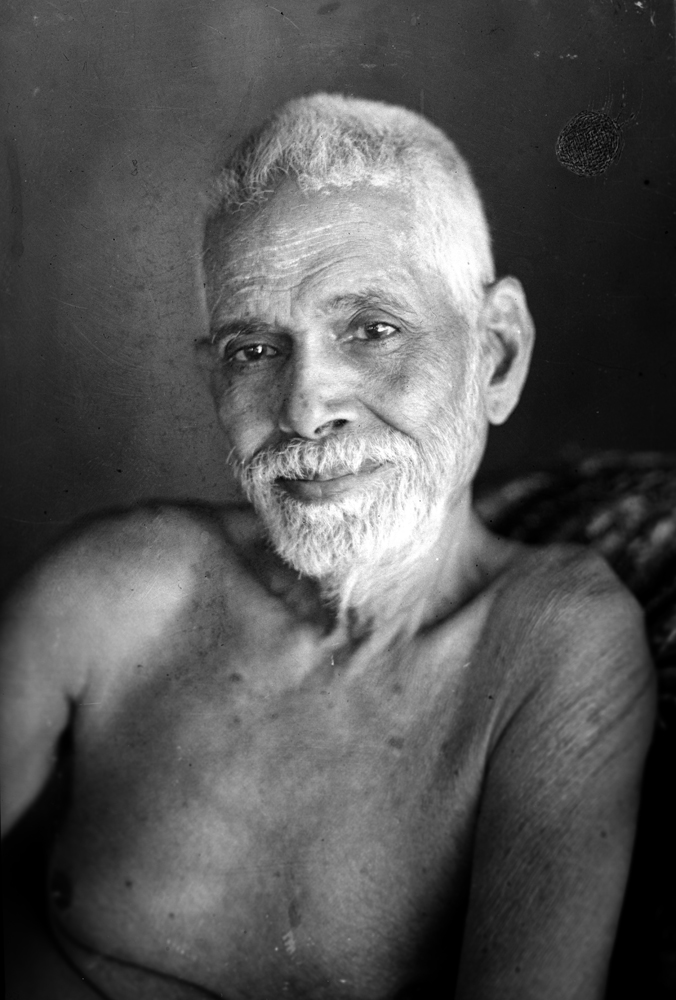
Bhagavan Sri Ramana Maharshi. An Indian guru who advocated Self-enquiry.

Self-enquiry, also spelled self-inquiry (Sanskrit vichara, also called jnana-vichara or ātma-vichār), is the constant attention to the inner awareness of "I" or "I am" recommended by Ramana Maharshi as the most efficient and direct way of discovering the unreality of the "I"-thought.

Ramana Maharshi taught that the "I"-thought will disappear and only "I-I" or self-awareness remains. This results in an "effortless awareness of being", and by staying with it this "I-I" gradually destroys the vasanas "which cause the 'I'-thought to rise," and finally the 'I'-thought never rises again, which is Self-realization or liberation.

== Etymology ==
Vichāra (Sanskrit: विचार) means deliberation; its root is वि (prefix to verbs and nouns it expresses) – चर् (to move, roam, obtain knowledge of). It is the faculty of discrimination between right and wrong; it is deliberation about cause and effect, and the final analysis. In various Indian traditions, it is inquiry into Satya, Ishvara and Brahman. In Vedanta, Vichāra is reflection and contemplation upon the meaning of Vedantic truths, revealing Brahman, the Universal Self.

Reflecting their backgrounds and interpretative frameworks, vichara is also called jnana-vichara or ātma-vichār by Ramana's devotees, (Note: In various Indian traditions, vichara is the enquiry into the nature of the Atman,Ātman (IAST: ātman, Sanskrit: आत्मन्) is a Sanskrit word that is usually translated as "self." In the western world the word "Self" signifies the whole of the individual being, where-as in the Indian context it signifies the unchanging essence which is identical to Brahman. The root *ēt-men (breath) is cognate with Old English "æþm", Greek "asthma", German "Atem": "atmen" (to breathe). It is derived from Latin "anima" (breath, soul), which is cognate to Sanskrit "ánilaḥ" (wind). Although "ánilaḥ" and "ātman" have similar meaning, they are not etymologically related. In Hindu philosophy, especially in the Vedanta school of Hinduism, Ātman is the first principle, the true self of an individual beyond identification with phenomena, the essence of an individual. To attain salvation (liberation), a human being must acquire self-knowledge (atma jnana), which is to realise that one's true self (Ātman) is identical with the transcendent self Brahman (or paramatman).) but in Ramana's explanations, "self-enquiry" is not the investigation of the "Self", "Atman", but of the "I", "aham" (Sanskrit), "nan" (Tamil).

== Origins ==
=== Ramana Maharshi ===
Ramana's teachings on Self-enquiry originated in his own awakening at age 16, when he became firmly aware of death. It made him aware of an indestructible current or force which transcended the body. Ramana summarised his insight into "aham sphurana" (Self-awareness) (Note: David Godman: "Bhagavan frequently used the Sanskrit phrase aham sphurana to indicate the 'I-I' consciousness or experience. Aham means 'I' and sphurana can be translated as 'radiation, emanation, or pulsation'.") to a visitor in 1945: (Note: An extensive account on Ramana's use of the words "Self", "I-I" and "aham sphurana" is given in)

In the vision of death, though all the senses were benumbed, the aham sphurana (Self-awareness) was clearly evident, and so I realised that it was that awareness that we call "I", and not the body. This Self-awareness never decays. It is unrelated to anything. It is Self-luminous. Even if this body is burnt, it will not be affected. Hence, I realised on that very day so clearly that that was "I". (Note: David Godman (23 June 2008), More on Bhagavan's death experience)

At first, Ramana thought that he was possessed by a spirit, "which had taken up residence in his body". (Note: David godman (7 May 2008), Bhagavan's death experience, quoting from "the editor's introduction", The Mountain Path, 1981, pp. 67–69) This feeling remained for several weeks.

Later in life, he called his death experience akrama mukti, "sudden liberation", as opposed to the krama mukti, "gradual liberation" as in the Vedanta path of jnana yoga: (Note: Rama P. Coomaraswamy: "[Krama-mukti is] to be distinguished from jîvan-mukti, the state of total and immediate liberation attained during this lifetime, and videha-mukti, the state of total liberation attained at the moment of death." See (Note: Swami Krishnananda, The Attainment of Liberation: Progressive Salvation) for more info on "gradual liberation".)

‘Some people,’ he said, 'start off by studying literature in their youth. Then they indulge in the pleasures of the world until they are fed up with them. Next, when they are at an advanced age, they turn to books on Vedanta. They go to a guru and get initiated by him and then start the process of sravana, manana and nididhyasana, which finally culminates in samadhi. This is the normal and standard way of approaching liberation. It is called krama mukti [gradual liberation]. But I was overtaken by akrama mukti [sudden liberation] before I passed through any of the above-mentioned stages.'

=== Interpretative background ===
According to David Frawley, "atma-vichara" is the most important practice in the Advaita Vedanta tradition, predating its popularisation by Ramana Maharshi. (Note: David Frawley, Self-Inquiry and Its Practice) It is part of the eighth limb of Patanjali's Yoga Sutras, which describes the various stages of samadhi. Meditation on "I-am-ness" is a subtle object of meditation in savikalpa samadhi. It is also described in the Yoga Vasistha, a syncretic work which may date from the 6th or 7th century CE, and shows influences from Yoga, Samkhya, Saiva Siddhanta and Mahayana Buddhism, especially Yogacara.

== Practice ==
=== Chasing the I ===
Ramana taught that by paying close attention to the 'I'-thought, this 'I'-thought will disappear and only "I-I" or Self-awareness remains. This results in an "effortless awareness of being", and by staying with it this "I-I" gradually destroys the vasanas "which cause the 'I'-thought to rise," and finally the 'I'-thought never rises again, which is Self-realization or liberation.

Ramana gave upadesa, "instruction or guidance given to a disciple by his Guru", (Note: Arthur Osborne, Ramana Maharshi and the Path of Self-Knowledge. Glossary) pointing to the true Self of the devotees and showing them the truth of it. As author and long-time devotee David Godman explains,

Beginners in self-enquiry were advised by Sri Ramana to put their attention on the inner feeling of 'I' and to hold that feeling as long as possible. They would be told that if their attention was distracted by other thoughts they should revert to awareness of the 'I'-thought whenever they became aware that their attention had wandered. He suggested various aids to assist this process – one could ask oneself 'Who am I?’ or 'Where does this I come from?’ — but the ultimate aim was to be continuously aware of the 'I' which assumes that it is responsible for all the activities of the body and the mind.

Self-enquiry can be practised at all times:

Self-enquiry should not be regarded as a meditation practice that takes place at certain hours and in certain positions; it should continue throughout one's waking hours, irrespective of what one is doing. Sri Ramana Maharshi saw no conflict between working and self-enquiry and he maintained that with a little practice it could be done under any circumstances. He did sometimes say that regular periods of formal practice were good for beginners, but he never advocated long periods of sitting meditation and he always showed his disapproval when any of his devotees expressed a desire to give up their mundane activities in favour of a meditative life.

=== Self is awareness ===
According to David Godman, Ramana stated that the Self is awareness:

The Truth is that Self is constant and unintermittent Awareness. The object of enquiry is to find the true nature of the Self as Awareness. Let one practise enquiry so long as separateness is perceived.

Giving up awareness of not-self leads to pure awareness:

You are awareness. Awareness is another name for you. Since you are awareness there is no need to attain or cultivate it. All that you have to do is to give up being aware of other things, that is of the not-self. If one gives up being aware of them then pure awareness alone remains, and that is the Self.

=== Textual references ===
Ramana's written works contain terse descriptions of self-enquiry. Verse thirty of Ulladu Narpadu: (Note: "The ‘Forty [Verses] on That Which Is’, is a Tamil poem that Sri Ramana composed in July and August 1928 when Sri Muruganar asked him to teach us the nature of the reality and the means by which we can attain it." From Ulladu Narpadu – an explanatory paraphrase. See also ULLADU NAARPADU (also spelt as Ulladu Narpadu): Comments By Professor V. Krishnamurthy)

Questioning 'Who am I?' within one's mind, when one reaches the Heart, the individual 'I' sinks crestfallen, and at once reality manifests itself as 'I-I'. Though it reveals itself thus, it is not the ego 'I' but the perfect being the Self Absolute.

Verses nineteen and twenty of Upadesa Undiyar (Note: Upadesa Undiyar – an explanatory paraphrase) describe the same process in almost identical terms:

19. 'Whence does the 'I' arise?' Seek this within. The 'I' then vanishes. This is the pursuit of wisdom.
20. Where the 'I' vanished, there appears an 'I-I' by itself. This is the infinite.

From Vichara Sangraham (Self-Enquiry):

Therefore, leaving the corpse-like body as an actual corpse and remaining without even uttering the word 'I' by mouth, if one now keenly enquires, 'What is it that rises as 'I'? then in the Heart a certain soundless sphurana, 'I-I', (Note: David Godman: "Bhagavan frequently used the Sanskrit phrase aham sphurana to indicate the 'I-I' consciousness or experience. Aham means 'I' and sphurana can be translated as 'radiation, emanation, or pulsation'." An extensive account on Ramana's use of the words "Self", "I-I" and "aham sphurana" is given in David Godman (1991), 'I' and 'I-I' – A Reader's Query. The Mountain Path, 1991, pp. 79–88. Part one.) will shine forth of its own accord. It is an awareness that is single and undivided, the thoughts which are many and divided having disappeared. If one remains still without leaving it, even the sphurana – having completely annihilated the sense of the individuality, the form of the ego, 'I am the body' — will itself in the end subside, just like the flame that catches the camphor. This alone is said to be liberation by great ones and scriptures.

== Compilation and publication ==
Early on, Ramana attracted devotees who would sit in his company, and ask him questions. Several devotees recorded the answers to their own specific questions, or kept the sheets of paper on which Ramana answered, and had them later published. Other devotees recorded the talks between Ramana and devotees, a large amount of which have also been published.

Ramana "never felt moved to formulate his teaching of his own accord, either verbally or in writing". The few writings he's credited with "came into being as answers to questions asked by his disciples or through their urging". Only a few hymns were written on his own initiative.

Ramana's earliest teachings are documented in the book Nan Yar? (Who am I?), in which he elaborates on the "I" and Self-enquiry. The original book was first written in Tamil, and published by Sri Pillai. The essay version of the book (Sri Ramana Nutrirattu) prepared by Ramana is considered definitive, as unlike the original, it had the benefit of his revision and review. "Nan Yar" was documented by his disciple M. Sivaprakasam Pillai, who was already heavily influenced by traditional Advaita, and so had added notes about the traditional Advaitic negation method for his own clarification; these additional notes were later removed by Ramana. A careful translation with notes is available in English as 'The Path of Sri Ramana, Part One' by Sri Sadhu Om, one of the direct disciples of Ramana.

== See also ==
Hinduism

- Nisargadatta Maharaj
- Nididhyasana
- Siddharameshwar Maharaj
- Dŗg-Dŗśya-Viveka

Veerashaivism

- Allama Prabhu

Buddhism

- Anatman
- Milinda Panha
- Hua Tou
- Bassui Tokushō
- Chinul
- Mahamudra
- Subitism
- Shikantaza

Modern psychology

- Psychology of self

== Sources ==
=== Printed sources ===
- Chapple, Christopher (1984), Introduction to "The Concise Yoga Vasistha", State University of New York
- Coomaraswamy, Rama P. (2004), The Essential Ananda K. Coomaraswamy, World Wisdom
- Deussen, Paul; Geden, A.S. (2010), The Philosophy of the Upanishads, Cosimo Classics, ISBN 978-1616402402
- Ebert, Gabriele (2006), Ramana Maharshi: His Life, Lulu.com
- Maehle, Gregor (2007), Ashtanga Yoga: Practice and Philosophy, New World Library
- Ramana Maharshi (1982), Who am I? (Nan Yar?) (PDF), Tiruvannamalai: Sriramanasasram, archived from the original (PDF) on 3 October 2012
- Sadhu Om (2005a), The Path of Sri Ramana, Part One (PDF), Tiruvannamalai: Sri Ramana Kshetra, Kanvashrama
- Zimmer, Heinrich (1948), De weg tot het Zelf. Leer en leven van de Indische heilige, Sri Ramana Maharshi uit Tiruvannamalai [The way to the self] (in Dutch), 's Graveland: Uitgeverij De Driehoek
