= Non-self =

Non-self may refer to:

- Anatta, in Buddhist philosophy, the "non-self" or "absence of separate self"
  - Anātman (Hinduism), a similar concept in Hinduism
- Open individualism, the philosophy that there exists only one numerically identical subject, who is everyone at all times, in the past, present and future.
- The distinction of self from non-self, a central concept in Immunology proposed by Macfarlane Burnet
- Exogenous antigen, a non-self molecule that stimulates an immune response
