= Shravana (hearing) =

Sanskrit term for hearing

Shravana (Sanskrit: श्रवण, romanized: Śravaṇa) is a Sanskrit term derived from the Sanskrit root श्रव (shrava), which means "hearing" or "the ear." Depending on context, shravana can mean 'the ear', 'the hypotenuse of a triangle', 'the act of hearing', 'study', 'fame', 'glory', 'that which is heard or revealed', 'wealth', 'flowing' or 'oozing'.

== Hindu philosophy ==
In Hindu philosophy and rituals, the hearing of the secrets of the Upanishads from the Guru is called Shravana which secrets are meant to be reflected upon to gain intellectual conviction. One learns by hearing, and hearing is the first stage of learning; it is the initiation during which the traditional Vedic doctrines are passed on by the teachers. Shravana is the mental activity by which the texts are understood in order to know the Truth about Brahman. The Sruti is the seed of Vedantic knowledge sown by the Guru (teacher) in the mind of shishya ('disciple') who then tends that seed by his shravana, manana and nididhyasana.

Yajnavalkya recommended to his wife, Maitreyi, the form of sadhana which consisted of darshana, shravana, manana and nididhyasana; darshana refers to seeing and realizing God or Brahman. He told her that the first stage in spiritual quest is Shravana, and one has to become a shravaka for whom hearing or shabda creates interests, then sorts out those interests, sifts the essential from the non-essential, removes confusion and doubts, and naturally leads to the next stage, Manana. Shravana is a psychological exercise. Vidyaranya in his Panchadasi (Sloka I.53) explains that:-

इत्थं वाक्यैस्तदर्थानुसन्धानं श्रवणं भवेत् |
युक्त्या संभावितत्वानुसंधानं मन्नन्तु तत् ||

the finding out or discovery of the true significance of the identity of the individual self and the supreme Universal Self with the great sayings is what is known as shravana; and to arrive at the possibility of its validity through logical reasoning is what is called manana. Hearing and discrimination are beneficial to knowledge, both are inter-connected and the internal means for the acquisition of Self-knowledge, the former involves analysis and argument, and the latter is the unceasing reflection on the non-duality of the individual self.

Sadananda explains that hearing is determination that the Vedanta teaches non-duality of Brahman on the basis of six characteristic signs – a) presentation of the subject matter at the beginning and the conclusion, b) repetition or repeated presentation of the subject matter, c) originality i.e. the subject matter is not known through any other source, d) result or utility of the subject matter, e) eulogy or praise of the subject matter and f) demonstration or reasoning in support of the subject matter. Shravana results in the genuine ascertaining of the true import of the Vedic texts and statements.
