= Anātman (Hinduism) =

Non-self

Anātman in Sanskrit means that "which is different from atman" or "non-self". In Hinduism, the former definition is found in some texts, while in Buddhism, anātman or anattā means non-self.

== Advaita concept of Anātman ==
According to Śrī Candraśekhara Bhāratī of Śringeri, Shankara does not use the term anātman to mean non-soul or anti-soul. The Ātman is formless and partless whose true nature cannot be perceived, while the anātman has form, has parts and whose nature can be perceived. Anātman, a creation of Brahman which is non-different from Brahman and has no existence apart from Brahman. To comprehend the difference between ātman and anātman is to become liberated.

In order to realise the self-existent eternal Atman, the seeker after Truth uses "Neti, neti", that is "not this, not this" on Anatman, to reach that which remains as Atman.

“Anātmanastu kāmāya sarvaṃ priyaṃ bhavati” (Bṛhadāraṇyaka Upanishad 2.4.5) — “All is dear, not for the sake of the non-self, but for the Self.”

== Buddhist concept of Anatman or Anatta ==
Buddhists believe that there is no permanent underlying substance called self or soul (Ātman) in human beings. They believe that anattā/anātman (non-self), impermanence and dukkha (suffering) are the three characteristics (trilakkhana) of all existence, and understanding of these three constitutes right understanding. "The anātman doctrine was in no sense an addendum, since it was fundamental to the other two doctrines; that is, because there is no real human or sentient self, there is no duration in human experience; and because there is no duration in human experience, there is no genuine happiness."

Nāgārjuna's explication of the theory of anātman as śūnyatā (emptiness) in the Mūlamadhyamakakārikā was part of his restatement of the Buddha's Four Noble Truths as well as a rejection of the philosophies of the early Buddhist schools of the Sarvastivadins and the Sautrāntika.

== See also ==
- Atman
- Paramatman
- Paramananda (Hinduism)
- Neti neti

== Sources ==
- Nāgārjuna; Kalupahana, David (1996). Mūlamadhyamakakārikā of Nāgārjuna. Motilal Banarsidass. ISBN 978-81-208-0774-7.
- Organ, Troy Wilson (1987). Philosophy and the Self: East and West. Associated University Presse. p. 161. ISBN 978-0-941664-80-6.
