= Paramatman =

Absolute Atman, or supreme Self, in various philosophies

Paramatman (Sanskrit: परमात्मन्, IAST: Paramātman) or Paramātmā is the absolute Atman, or supreme Self, in various philosophies such as the Vedanta and Yoga schools in Hindu theology, as well as other Indian religions such as Sikhism. Paramatman is the "Primordial Self" or the "Self Beyond" who is spiritually identical with the absolute and ultimate reality. Selflessness is the attribute of Paramatman, where all personality/individuality vanishes.

== Etymology ==
The word stem paramātman ([pɐɾɐmaːtmɐn], its nominative singular being paramātmā — परमात्मा, pronounced [pɐɾɐmaːtmaː]) is formed from two words, parama, meaning "supreme" or "highest", and ātman, which means individual self.

The word Ātman generally denotes the Individual Self, but by the word Paramatman which word also expresses Boundless Life, Boundless Consciousness, Boundless Substance in Boundless Space, is meant the Atman of all atmans or the Supreme Self or the Universal Self. The word Ātman (Atma, आत्मा, आत्मन्) is a Sanskrit word that refers to "essence, breath.", (Note: Atman Britannica, Atman Hindu philosophy) (Note: Atman Etymology Dictionary, Douglas Harper (2012)) is often equated with Brahman, the subtlest indestructible Divine existence. The word Paramatman refers to the Creator of all.

== Jainism ==
In Jain mysticism, each atman or individual self is a potential Paramatman or God; both are essentially the same. It remains an atman only because of its binding karmic limitations, until such time as those limitations are removed. As Paramatman, the atman represents the ultimate point of spiritual evolution.

Even though Jain mysticism centers on Atman and Paramatman because it affirms the existence of the soul, in Jainism, which does not accept the Vedic notion of Paramatman, all enlightened souls are referred to as Paramatman and regarded as gods, while it honours the soul of each person as its own strictly eternally distinct saviour. Because the Jain paramātman neither creates nor governs the cosmos, Jainism has no place for a creator deity, and is thus classified as a heterodox (nāstika) school in the Indian philosophical tradition.

== Hinduism ==
Hindus believe in one God, who is known variously as Paramatman, Parameshwar, Parabrahman, Purushottam and so on. Even though God is one, He manifests in infinite forms, but this should not to be confused with the belief that there are multiple Gods.

Hindus conceptualize Parabrahman in diverse ways. In the Advaita Vedanta tradition, Nirguna Brahman (Brahman without attributes) is Parabrahman. In Dvaita and Vishistadvaita Vedanta traditions, Saguna Brahman (Brahman with qualities) is Parabrahman. In Vaishnavism, Shaivism and Shaktism, Vishnu, Shiva and Adi Shakti respectively are Parabrahman. Mahaganapati is considered as Parabrahman by the Ganapatya sect. Kartikeya is considered as Parabrahman by the Kartikeya sect.

=== Description in the Upanishads ===
The sage of the Brihadaranyaka Upanishad IV.4.2, although not using the word Paramatman, explains that at the time of release the portion (aspect) of the Paramatman and the portion (aspect) of the Jiva presiding in the right eye become unified with the Paramatman and the Jiva presiding in the heart, then the Jiva does not see, smell, taste, speak, hear, feel, touch and know; when Paramatman goes out, the Chief Prana goes out after him, followed by the Lower Prana. Paramatman goes out riding on the Jiva following consciousness and work, knowledge of former life or natural capacity. In the Prashna Upanishad IV.11 the word Atman cannot refer to Jiva because the Jiva cannot of its own accord throw off its body or understand avidya, therefore, it refers to Paramatman. The Jiva attains Moksha when he actually knows the Paramatman, the Asarira Prajnatman, to be thousand-headed, to be the governor of all and to be superior to all. Thus, Paramatman is one of the many aspects of Brahman and has all attributes of Brahman. Atman (Spirit) and Paramatman (God) are one, some say they are distinct as well as one, they are one with reference to Shakti but distinct with reference to that power.

=== Parable of the two birds ===
The word Paramatman is not to be found in the Rig Veda but through allusion referring to Paramatman as Isha. This distinction is made because all of its mantras which in the form of prayers are addressed to gods. In its great Riddle Hymn (Sukta I.164) is the famous mantra - R.V.I.164.20, that was revealed to Rishi Deergatamaah Auchathyah and borrowed by Mundaka Upanishad III.1.1-3, which belongs to Atharva Veda, to weave the parable of the Two Birds:-Two birds.

Two birds, beautiful of wings, close companions, cling to one common tree: of the two one eats the sweet fruit of that tree; the other eats not but watches his companion. The self is the bird that sits immersed on the common tree; but because he is not lord he is bewildered and has sorrow. But when he sees that other who is the Lord and the beloved, he knows that all is His greatness and his sorrow passes away from him. When, a seer, he sees the Golden-hued, the maker, the Lord, the Spirit who is the source of Brahman, then he becomes the knower and shakes from his wings sin and virtue; pure of all stains he reaches the supreme identity.

— Translation of Verses 1-3 of Third Mundaka Upanishad by Sri Aurobindo.

Aurobindo makes the Spirit or Purusha the Source of everything, including Brahman. He makes Purusha more fundamental. Thus, he does not have to say Brahman to be the source of inferior Brahman, and he also dismisses the sense of Reality revealed in imaginative and emotional build-up.

=== Concept of two souls ===
The Dualistic school of philosophy initiated by Anandatirtha draws its support from the afore-cited passage as well as from the passage of Katha Upanishad I.3.1 of an earlier Upanishad that speaks about two souls which taste the fruits of action, both of which are lodged in the recess of the human heart, and which are different from each other as light and shade, that carried the flaw—how could the Universal soul be regarded as enjoying the fruits of action? The followers of Madhva draw their support from the Bhagavad Gita XV.16 that speaks about two persons in this world, the Mutable and the Immutable; the Mutable is all these things, while the Immutable is the one who exists at the top of them, one is the Jivatman and the other, Paramatman. Jivatman is chit, the sentient, and Paramatman is Isvara, both have the same attributes; they are inseparably present together on the tree which is achit, the insentient, or the gross Avidya component of existence. Jivatman and Paramatman are both seated in the heart, the former is driven by the three modes of nature and acts, the latter simply witnesses as though approving the former's activities. The relationship between Paramātmā, the Universal Self, and 'ātma, the Individual Self, is likened to the indwelling God and the soul within one's heart. Paramatman is one of the many aspects of Brahman. Paramatman is situated at the core of every individual jiva in the macrocosm. The Upanishads do compare Atman and Paramatman to two birds sitting like friends on the branch of a tree (body) where the Atman eats its fruits (karma), and the Paramatman only observes the Atman as a witness (sākṣin) of His friend's actions.

=== Advaita ===
In Advaita philosophy, individual souls are called Jīvātman, and the Highest Brahman is called Paramātman. The Jivatman and the Paramatman are known to be one and the same when the Jivatman attains the true knowledge of the Brahman (Sanskrit Brahmajñāna). In the context of Advaita, the word Paramatman is invariably used to refer to Nirguna Brahman, with Ishvara and Bhagavan being terms used to refer to Brahman with qualities, or Saguna Brahman. However, there is still a tendency in Shankara to use interchangeably the terms Paramatman and Ishvara, even when he is referring to personal names of Ishvara like Narayana and Vishnu.

Brahman and Isvara are not synonymous words, the apparent similarity is on account of similar looking attributes imagined with regard to the impressions these two words activate. According to Advaita, Isvara is Brahman associated with maya in its excellent aspect, as the empirical reality it is the determinate Brahman; Isvara has no reality apart from Brahman. The Svetasvatara Upanishad developed the conception of a personal God. The Katha Upanishad states that never has any man been able to visualise Paramatman by means of sight, heart, imagination or mind. The Anandamaya-kosha is the Isvara of the Upanishads. Gaudapada called duality maya, and non-duality, the only reality. Maya is the Cosmic Nescience that has in it the plurality of subject and object and therefore, Isvara is organically bound with the world. Beyond the Prana or Isvara is the state of the Infinite limitless Brahman which is why in the Bhagavad Gita VII.24, Krishna tells Arjuna—"not knowing My unsurpassable and undecaying supreme nature the ignorant believe Me to have assumed a finite form through birth."

With regard to the cause of samsāra, as to where it resides and the means of its removal, Adi Shankara in his Vivekachudamani.49. instructs that the individual self is the Paramatman in reality, the association of the individual self with ajnana i.e. with avidya, which he terms as anatmabandhah, bondage by the anatman or non-atman, makes it to identify itself with gross, subtle and causal bodies and from that arises samsāra, which is of the form of superimposition of qualities of sukha, dukkha etc., on itself, the atman.

=== Vaishnavism ===
Paramatman is beyond knowledge and ignorance, devoid of all material attributes (upadhi). In Chapter 13 of the Bhagavad Gita, Paramatman is described as Krishna residing in the hearts of all beings and in every atom of matter. Paramatman is also described in the Bhagavad Gita (Chapter 9) as worthy of the bhakti (devotion) of the individual selves:

For I am actually both the one who receives and the Lord over all acts of worship. ...Whoever offers even a leaf, a flower, fruit, or water to Me in devotion, That is a meaningful offering I accept from those whose souls are truly devoted.

He is the overseer and the permitter of their actions. Paramatman is different from five elements (pancha mahabhutas), the senses, mind, pradhana and jiva.

Vaishnava sects maintain that attaining knowledge of Brahman and identification of atman with Brahman is an intermediate stage of self-realization, and only Bhakti Yoga can lead to the next step of Paramatman realization as the indwelling God, ultimately leading up to liberation (Mukti) by God-realization.

The Viṣṇu or the deity of the quality of goodness in the material world is the puruṣa-avatāra known as Kṣīrodakaśāyī Viṣṇu or Paramātmā.

In Bengal, Vaishnava Krishna is viewed as one endowed with his essential svarupa-shakti; he is Bhagawat in full manifestation endowed with Jivasakti and Mayasakti, he the Paramatman and Brahman. Brahman, Paramatman and Bhagavan are 3 gradations of the ultimate reality.

Jiva Goswami, Gaudiya Vaishnava scholar, distinguishes between Brahman, Paramatman, and Bhagavan, citing a passage from the Bhagavata Purana (1.2.11): "The knowers of the Absolute Reality call that Reality advaya-jnana, 'nondual consciousness,' which is designated as Brahman, Paramatma or Bhagavan." He asserts that the one absolute reality is conceived with different terms depending on who is doing the conceiving: the Advaitins conceive of it as an "all-pervasive Brahman"; the yogis conceive of it as Paramatman; and the Vaishnavas conceive of it as Bhagavan who possesses a transcendent and immaterial form. Goswami contends that Bhagavan is the most complete conception or manifestation of the Absolute Reality, and the other two are dependent and based on it, Brahman (who is undifferentiated) and Paramatman (as the Supreme soul) are thus understood to be included in Bhagavan.

== Time ==
Time is described in the Bhagavata Purana:

My Lord, I consider Your Lordship to be eternal time, the supreme controller, without beginning and end, the all-pervasive one. ... Eternal time is the witness of all our actions, good and bad, and thus resultant reactions are destined by Him. It is no use saying that we do not know why and for what we are suffering. We may forget the misdeed for which we may suffer at this present moment, but we must remember that Paramātmā is our constant companion, and therefore He knows everything, past, present and future. And because the Paramātmā feature of Lord Kṛṣṇa destines all actions and reactions, He is the supreme controller also. Without His sanction not a blade of grass can move.

== See also ==
- Anima mundi
- Names of God
- Paramananda (Hinduism)
- Rāja yoga
- Sattva

== Sources ==
- Dalal, Roshen (2011). Hinduism: An Alphabetical Guide. Penguin Books India. ISBN 9780143414216.
- Fowler, Jeaneane D. (2002). Perspectives of Reality: An Introduction to the Philosophy of Hinduism. Sussex Academic Press. ISBN 978-1-898723-93-6.
