= Nididhyāsana =

Hindu philosophical concept

Nididhyasana (Sanskrit: निदिध्यासन) is profound and repeated meditation. In Advaita Vedanta and Jnana Yoga, it is meditation on Brahman and contemplation of mahavakyas, great Upanishadic statements such as "That art Thou", to realize the identity of Atman and Brahman. In Dvaita Vedanta, Madhva describes nididhyasana as dhyana, or continuous meditation, which follows sravana, and manana and leads to direct realization. In Advaita Vedanta, nididhyasana follows preparatory practices, listening to the teachings as contained in the sruti, and reflection on the teachings.

== Preliminary qualifications and stages of practice ==
According to Puligandla, Advaita Vedanta teaches that moksha is attained through jnana yoga, the path of knowledge. He describes jnana yoga as consisting of four parts: samanyasa (cultivating certain qualities), sravana (listening), manana (reflection), and dhyana (Yogic meditation).

The Tattva Bodha describes four qualifications (sādhana-chatustaya):

- Nityānitya vastu viveka (नित्यानित्य वस्तु विवेकम्) — The ability (viveka) to discriminate between the eternal (nitya; permanent) and the ephemeral (anitya; impermanent). Brahman is eternal, while everything else is transient.
- Ihāmutrārtha phala bhoga virāga (इहाऽमुत्रार्थ फल भोगविरागम्) — detachment from enjoyment of the fruits of action in this world or another.
- Śamādi ṣatka sampatti (शमादि षट्क सम्पत्ति) — the six sub-qualifications:
  - Śama - control or mastery over the mind.
  - Dama - control of the external senses.
  - Uparati - adherence to one's own dharma (duty). (Note: nivartitānāmeteṣāṁ tadvyatiriktaviṣayebhya uparamaṇamuparatirathavā vihitānāṁ karmaṇāṁ vidhinā parityāgaḥ[Vedāntasāra, 21])
  - Titikṣa - the endurance of opposites such as heat and cold, and pleasure and pain.
  - Śraddhā - faith in Guru's teaching and the scriptures.
  - Samādhāna - a focused mind.
- Mumukṣutva (मुमुक्षुत्वम्) — a strong desire to attain moksha (liberation).

Mayeda describes three stages in the attainment of final release in Vedanta as:

- Sravana, hearing, in which the teacher explains the meaning of the scriptures to the pupil; listening to the sages on the Upanishads and Advaita Vedanta and stydying Vedantic texts.
- Manana (reflection), the stage of reflection on the teachings, in which the pupil reflects repeatedly on the meaning of the scriptures through reasoning and discussion with the teacher;
- Nididhyāsana, the stage of meditation

Nididhyasana is a rational and cognitive process, which differs from dhyana (meditation). It is necessary for gaining Brahmajnana:

आत्मा ब्रह्मेति वाक्यार्थे निःशेषेण विचारिते
By a thorough analysis of "Atman is Brahman" the direct knowledge "I am Brahman" is achieved (Panchadasi VII.58).

Nididhyasana done independently of sravana does not lead to the realization of the Atman.

== Explanation ==
=== Advaita Vedanta ===
The Brihadaranyaka Upanishad verse 2.4.5 defines Nididhyasana as sustained contemplation of the Self, following hearing and reflection. Yajnavalkya tells his wife, Maitreyi:

आत्मा वा अरे द्रष्टव्यः श्रोतव्यो मन्तव्यो निदिध्यासितव्यो मैत्रेयि,
आत्मनो व अरे दर्शनेन श्रवणेन मत्या विज्ञानेनेदं सर्वं विदितम् ||

"The Self, my dear Maitreyi, should be realized – should be heard of, reflected on and meditated upon;
by the realization of the Self, my dear, through hearing, reflection and meditation, all this is known." - (Brihadaranyaka Upanishad verse 2.4.5)

Isaeva describes nididhyasana as "deep meditation", consisting in "the removal from the adept's consciousness of everything superfluous and the concentration of his mind on Brahman". Mayeda states that the three stages, sravana, manana, and nididhyasana seem to correspond to the three prose chapters of the Adi Shankara's Upadeśasāhasrī.

According to Suresvara, nididhyasana is the culmination of the practices of sravana and manana. It is an indirect intuition of Brahman and does not mean meditation, but knowledge (vijnana) i.e. understanding the meaning of the Sruti on the basis of vacya-vacaka relation underlying the mahavakya. Suresvara states:-

शास्त्रचार्यानुभवनैर्हेतुभिश्च समर्थितः|
ईदृगैकात्म्यसंबोधो निदिध्यासनमुच्यते ||

"Nididhyasana is so called when, instruction about the uniqueness of the Atman is justified
by (proper) reasons viz. the Sruti, (the instructions of) teachers and (one’s own) experience (of the same)."

Nididhyasana consists in acquisition of vakyarthajnana and this verse explains the purport of sunisnata.

According to Vacaspati, sravana, manana and nidihyasana are a chain of causes contributing to the knowledge of the oneness of Brahman. The Vivarana school considers sravana as the principal cause but Suresvara treats sravana and manana to be co-existent, these two practices culminate into nididhyasana.

Mayeda notes that Sadananda's Vedantasara added the fourth stage, "concentration" (samadhi) to the stages of hearing, reflection, and meditation. The Vivekacudamani, incorrectly attributed to Shankars, states:

श्रुतेः शतगुणं विद्यान्मननं मननादपि |
निदिध्यासं लक्षगुणम् अनन्तं निर्विकल्पकम् ||

"Reflection (manana) is hundred times superior to listening (sravana);
meditation (nididhyasana) is hundred times superior to reflection; nirvikalpaka samadhi is infinitely superior."

=== Dvaita Vedanta ===
According to Madhva the knowledge acquired by study ('śravaṇa') and stabilized by reflection ('manana') is made the basis of steady contemplation ('nididhyasana'). B. N. K. Sharma notes that in Dvaita Vedanta, śravaṇa, manana, and nididhyasana form spiritual inquiry, and nididhyasana is identified with dhyana, or continuous meditation. Sravana gives knowledge of the meaning of the sacred texts, and manana removes doubts and clarifies their meaning. Nididhyasana then uses this knowledge as the basis for steady contemplation and leads to direct realization (darsana or saksatkara). Sharma describes Nididhyasana, or dhyana, as "virtually the same as the state of Samadhi or introspection taught by the Yoga system". Radhakrishnan has defined Nididhyasana as "the process by which intellectual conscience is transformed into a vital one there is stillness, a calm in which the soul lays itself open to the Divine".

=== Neo-Vedanta ===
According to Michael James, who gives an Advaita Vedanta interpretation of Ramana Maharshi, Ramana's self-enquiry is the same as Nididhyasana and atma-vichara. (Note: Michael James, Self-enquiry: the underlying philosophy can be clearly understood only by putting it into practice)

== See also ==
- Lectio Divina

== Sources ==
=== Printed ===
- Isaeva, Natalia (1993). Shankara and Indian Philosophy. State University of New York Press. ISBN 978-1-4384-0762-3.
- Mayeda, Sengaku (2006). A Thousand Teachings: The Upadesasahasri of Sankara. Motilal Banarsidass. ISBN 978-81-208-2771-4.
- Puligandla, Ramakrishna (1997), Fundamentals of Indian Philosophy, New Delhi: D.K. Printworld (P) Ltd.
- Rambachan, Anantanand (1991), Accomplishing the Accomplished, University of Hawaii Press
- Sharma, B.N.Krishnamurti (1986). Philosophy of Sri Madhvacarya. Motilal Banarsidass. ISBN 9788120800687.
- Svarupa Chaitanya (1997). Tattva Bodha of Sankaracharya.
