= Paramananda (Hinduism) =

Sanskrit term for supreme happiness

Paramananda (Sanskrit: परमानन्द, romanized: Paramānanda) is a Sanskrit term composed of two words: parama and ānanda. The word parama is interpreted as "the highest" or "transcendent," while ānanda means "bliss" or "happiness." Additionally, it suggests a profound spiritual emotion that is deeply rooted. The authors of the Upanishads also used ānanda to refer to Brahman, the Supreme Being in Hinduism.

== Jivanmukti ==
Joy, happiness, or bliss, which are among the four moral ends towards which human beings direct their efforts, are attained through good thoughts and good deeds, which, in turn, depend on the state and control of the mind. This implies that supreme bliss is achieved by maintaining evenness of temper—practising equanimity in all actions—without being attached to or instrumental in making those actions bear fruit.

The Bhagavad Gita highlights this principle by referencing five types of actions using specific verbs:

1. Karoṣhi – Ordinary activities carried out for earning a livelihood or fulfilling social duties.
2. Aśhnāsi – Activities necessary for sustaining life, such as eating and drinking.
3. Juhoṣhi – Actions related to worship, meditation, and spiritual practices.
4. Dadāsi – Acts of charity and giving.
5. Tapasyasi – Practices that promote self-restraint, including all forms of austere penance.

These actions, with which an ordinary person identifies, often lead to attachment and craving for their results. The practice of equanimity involves letting go of this wrong identification, attachment, and craving.

A person experiences delight arising from the contact of the senses with objects of enjoyment. Additionally, there is enjoyment derived from practices such as adoration, meditation, and similar spiritual pursuits, through which the end of sorrow may be achieved. However, even this does not constitute the state of supreme or true happiness.

Both physical and spiritual pursuits result in bliss. While the former represents an aspect of bliss, the latter embodies the highest form of bliss.

According to the Vedanta school of Hindu philosophy, Ānanda is the state of sublime delight achieved when the Jiva—the individual empirical self—becomes free from all sins, doubts, desires, actions, pains, and suffering, as well as from ordinary physical and mental pleasures. Once established in Brahman—the eternal Universal Self and the subtle essence underlying all existence—the Jiva attains the state of Jivanmukta, or liberation.

== Experience with self-realisation ==
The sage of the Rigveda, in Sukta 10.109, reminds us that "speech," in its undifferentiated state, serves no purpose in performing yagnas meant to invoke the gods, who were among the first-born. This inherent limitation (dosha) of speech is addressed by making it differentiated—recognisable and understandable. Existence itself came into being through the partial differentiation of the Undifferentiated, enabling the experience of both the differentiated and the undifferentiated.

Parashara does not imply the rebirth of liberated souls. In his mantra (Rigveda 1.72.2), he uses the term amritaah to denote the uncreated, eternal state, and the phrase pade parame to refer to the exalted state of perfect unity with the undifferentiated universal consciousness. From this point of the journey, there is no return (Anaavrttiah shabdaata; Brahma Sutra 4.4.22).

Even though Vakya Vritti (Sl. 53) explains that Kaivalya is the final destination of evolution—where one attains Absolute Oneness with the Divine and, by realising one's true essence, enjoys the endless, immeasurable bliss called Padamapada—Yama tells Naciketa that:

- The mind is Buddhi;
- Above Buddhi is the Mahat Atman;
- Above the Mahat Atman is the Avyakta; and
- Above the Avyakta is the Purusha.

Beyond the Purusha, there is nothing else (Katha Upanishad I.3.10-11).

Similarly, Krishna tells Arjuna that while all embodied beings emanate from the Unmanifest and ultimately merge back into it, there exists yet another eternal Unmanifest Existence far beyond this—the Supreme Divine Being. This Supreme Being does not perish even when all things cease to exist (Bhagavad Gita VIII).

There is nothing beyond this Supreme Reality, for, as Adi Shankara explains: "The constituents that spring from ignorance leave no remnant after their dissolution through knowledge."

Moreover, the Jiva is but a false appearance, being merely a reflection of the Supreme Self. This reflection is dispelled only through Self-realisation (Brahma Sutra II.iii.50).

To realise that the Self is already attained is not difficult, for self-realisation becomes apparent instantly with the dawn of the highest knowledge. However, merely knowing this intellectually, without experiencing spiritual progress and the ecstasy that accompanies it, is akin to not knowing the Self at all. It is comparable to not understanding the true essence of purity.

In the state of realisation, all finite ideas vanish. The realised individual exists solely as the Self—eternal bliss—and as the eternal subject, distinct from all objects. Thus, the experience of Paramananda is to be understood as distinct from Ānanda.

== Self-realisation ==
Ramachandra Dattatrya Ranade states that the bliss of self-realisation is experienced only when the Self is perceived in its native purity. It is implied that the Self is the sole object of desire. However, he cautions that the term Self or Atman must not be interpreted in an egoistic sense. While enjoying the bliss of self-realisation, one perceives their own form in a flood of supreme light arising from within themselves.

The unique awareness of Sameness, which is essentially the awareness of Oneness, represents the knowledge of Reality. This Reality is Bliss and the sole source of all bliss.

The bliss of self-realisation is Paramananda. It is the experience attained by reaching beyond Avyakta (the Undifferentiated) into sublime regions where duality cannot and does not exist. As the knower of the Vedas (a man of knowledge) has no desire for worldly pleasures, the bliss of all creatures is his (Panchadasi XIV-34).

The experience of Sukha (absolute bliss) is neither found in Rajasika nor in Tamasika Vrittis, but it is observed to a greater or lesser degree in Sattvika Vrittis (Panchadasi XV-13).

Whatever is experienced is Brahman alone, as it is a reflection of Brahman. When the Vritti (mental modification) is directed inward or withdrawn, the reflection of Paramananda becomes unobstructed (Panchadasi XV-19).

Adi Shankara, in his commentary on Brahma Sutra III.iii.41, explains that when Vamadeva realised the Self as That (Brahman), he declared, "I was Manu and the sun." This indicates that the result of knowledge, which consists of becoming identified with all, arises simultaneously with the attainment of complete illumination. Hence, liberation becomes inevitable for a man of knowledge.

At this stage—avibhaagen drshtatvaata (Brahma Sutra IV.iv.4)—liberation is attained, and the soul exists in a state of inseparability from the supreme Self. The liberated soul, "established in Infinity, delights in its own Self and disports in its own Self" (Chandogya Upanishad VII.xxv.2),

In this highest state, which the knowers of Brahman describe as the ultimate, the five senses of knowledge, along with the mind, cease their functions. The intellect, characterised by determination, also becomes inactive (Katha Upanishad II.iii.10).

Rishi Bandhvaduya Gopayanah (Rigveda 10.60.8) reminds us that the mind remains bound to the Jivatman not for the destruction of Prana and its associated aspects, but for their preservation, as life depends on them. However, it is equally true that the apparent universe, which has its roots in the mind, ceases to exist once the mind is annihilated.

The annihilation of the mind occurs when it is directed to focus on the Self, with the purpose of transcending the entire objective universe. This pursuit aims to realise the identity of the Jiva and Brahman, leading to self-realisation and the simultaneous experience of eternal bliss—Paramananda.
