= Manan (reflection) =

Manan (Sanskrit: मनन) is the deep state of thinking without joy or grief. Yajnavalkya in the context of the mahavakya – Tat Tvam Asi, told Paingala that whereas shravana ('hearing') is the inquiry into the real significance of this vākya, to inquire in solitude into the significance of shravana is Manan (consideration or reflection). Patanjali terms Manan as dharana, the unshakeable mental conviction.

In Advaita Vedanta, Manan, the deep reflection on what is heard from the teacher, is a part of the three-fold process of shravana-Manan-nididhyasana, the three stages of religious life which combined acting as the path of knowledge, lead to the attainment of moksha. According to the Pasupatas belonging to the cult of Shiva, Manan is a satmaka or mastery over the power of seeing and acting; Manan is the supernormal knowing of objects of thoughts.

Manan means – 'thinking', 'reflection', 'meditation', 'cogitation'; Panchadasi (Sloka I.53) reads as follows:-

इत्थं वाक्यैस्तदर्थानुसन्धानं श्रवणं भवेत् |
युक्त्या संभावितत्वानुसंधानं मन्नन्तु तत् ||

"The finding out or discovery of the true significance of the identity of the individual self and the supreme Universal Self with the great sayings is what is known as shravana; and to arrive at the possibility of its validity through logical reasoning is what is called Manan."

In this context, Vidyaranya had previously stated that the Self is untouched by doubts about the presence or absence of associates etc; that are superimposed on it phenomenally. In the afore-cited sloka, Swami Swahananda in his commentary explains that whatever be the relation between two vikalpas ('alternatives'), relation itself has to be understood which even though not an attribute is to be related, for the domain of bheda ('difference') is riddled with contradictions. Vedanta considers vikalpa as kalpana or 'contrary imagination' that invariably leads to anavastha ('infinite regress'). The identity alluded to by the great sayings (mahavakyas) conveyed by a Guru to his disciples i.e. sown in the mind of his sisya, have logical support for their validity which support is revealed through Manan which process reveals true knowledge.

It is through deep meditation that the knowledge of Brahman is gained, and Katha Upanishad (I.iii.15) declares that one becomes free from the jaws of death by knowing that which is ever constant; Badarayana states that what is mentioned in that Upanishad is meant for deep meditation on Purusha - आध्यानाय प्रयोजनाभावात् (Brahma Sutras III.iii.14), during which process the differing attributes are not to be combined but only non-different attributes which exist collectively in all the contexts.
