= Viveka (disambiguation) =

Viveka is the Sanskrit and Pali term for discernment or discrimination.

Viveka, or Viveca, may also refer to:

== People ==
- Viveca Lindfors (1920–1995), Swedish actress
- Viveca Novak, American journalist
- Viveca Paulin (born 1969), Swedish actress and auctioneer
- Viveca Serlachius (1923–1993), Finnish-born Swedish actress
- Viveca Sten (born 1959), Swedish novelist
- Viveca Vázquez, Puerto Rican dancer
- Viveka (lyricist), Indian lyricist
- Viveka Babajee (1973–2010), Mauritian model and actress
- Viveka Davis (born 1969), American actress
- Viveka Eriksson (born 1956), Åland Islands politician
- Viveka Seldahl (1944–2001), Swedish actress

== Fictional characters ==
- Viveca, a character in the 2009 animated fantasy film Barbie and the Three Musketeers

== See also ==
- G. Vivekanand, Indian politician
- Vivek (disambiguation), an Indian masculine given name
- Vivekanandan (disambiguation), an Indian name that is mostly used in South India
- Swami Vivekananda (disambiguation)
- Vivegam, 2017 Indian Tamil-language film by Siva, starring Ajith Kumar
- Vivica A. Fox (born 1964), American actress
