= Aparokshanubhuti =

Indian philosophy book

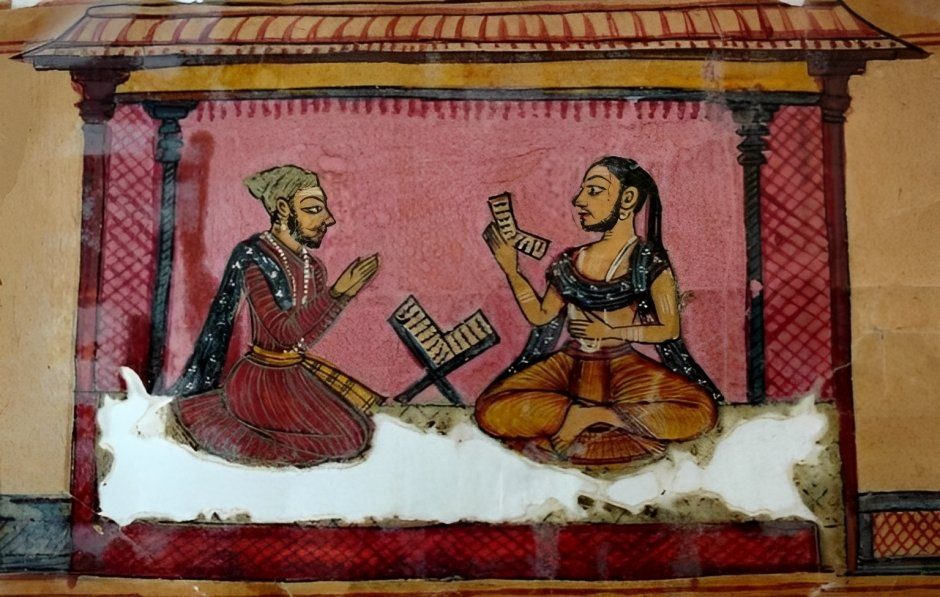
- Contemporary manuscript painting depicting Shivaji Shahaji Bhonsale and Sant Jairam Swami of Vadgaon, from an illustrated Aparokshanubhuti Granth manuscript.
- Language: Sanskrit
- Subject: Indian philosophy
- Publication place: India

The Aparokshanubhuti (Sanskrit: अपरोक्षानुभूतिः), meaning "direct experience" or "self realization," is a Sanskrit Advaita Vedanta work attributed to Adi Shankara although modern scholars date its composition to 12th century CE. As an introductory work (prakarana grantha), it is best known for synthesizing non-dual metaphysics with a dsitinct fifteen-limbed system of Raja Yoga, harmonizing practical mental discipline with non-dual gnosis (jnana). The text also outlines a strongly world-renouncing view of non-attachment (vairagya). Its historical influence was solidified by Vidyaranya's 14th-century commentary, Aparoksadipika, and later English translations that popularized the work globally.

== Etymology ==
The title Aparokshanubhuti is a Sanskrit compound formed from aparoksha (meaning "direct", "immediate", or "not indirect") and anubhuti (meaning "perception", cognition", or "experience"). Modern scholars and translators frequently render the title as "self-realization". In early printed English editions, such as the 1879 Bombay lithograph text, it was translated as "the knowledge of the soul or the all-pervading spirit." From a philosophical standpoint within Advaita Vedanta, the term describes a "direct, liberating, transcendent communion" or intuitive spiritual sight, distinguishing immediate non-dual realization from indirect intellectual learning.

== Authorship and dating ==
Although the text is traditionally attributed to Adi Shankara, modern scholarly consensus indicates a more complex timeline of composition. Strictly speaking, while Shankara establishes the terminus a quo (the earliest possible limit), the fourteenth-century commentary Aparoksadipika by Vidyaranya defines the terminus ad quem (the latest possible limit), creating a historical window of roughly five centuries in which the text could have been written. Based on historical and textual analyses, scholars suggest that the Aparokshanubhuti was actually composed only a century or two prior to the writing of Vidyaranya's fourteenth-century commentary.

== Philosophy and teachings ==
The Aparokshanubhuti is notable for its synthesis of Advaita Vedanta metaphysics with classical Yoga practices. Its formulation of Raja Yoga represents an attempt to homologize traditional physical and mental yoga auxiliaries (i.e., anga) with Vedantic non-dual doctrine. Unlike many other pre-fifteenth-century medieval Yoga texts, which predominantly defined Raja Yoga simply as the state of samadhi, the Aparokshanubhuti outlines a distinct fifteen-limbed system of Yoga. This integration of Advaita Vendanta with yogic elements reflect a broader trend in late medieval Indian philosophy, where commentators and compilers frequently enmeshed non-dual viewpoints with practical yoga methodologies including those from texts like the Yoga Vasistha and the Bhagavata Purana. Rather than viewing meditative techniques and physical disciplines as separate from or contradictory to non-dual knowledge (jnana), these late medieval traditional sought to harmonize practical mental control with Advaita metaphysics, bridging the ancient tension between active ritual practice and passive gnosis. Vidyaranya's commentary was also dubbed "yogic Advaita."

Additionally, the text adopts a highly world-renouncing perspective toward the material universe. The text defines pure non-attachment (vairagya) as a complete disregard for all physical objects.

The Aparokshanubhuti also discusses prarabdha, the karmic consequences of past deeds in the present life. The work mentions a jnani does not bear karmic consequences in the present birth upon realization.

== Historical commentaries, translations and publications ==
The preservation and dissemination of the Aparokshanubhuti have been aided by several key comentaries and translations over the centuries. The oldest extant commentary on this work is a Sanskrit commentary titled Aparoksadipika by Vidyaranya (14th century). This work has been repeatedly translated and commented upon in other languages. In 1879, a lithograph edition featuring Vidyaranya's commentary as published in Bombay under the English title Aparokshanubhuti; or the Knowledge of the Soul or the All-pervading Spirit.

In 1885, the Indian scholar Manilal Nabhubhai Dvivedi published an English translation of the text in his compilation Raja Yoga, or the Practical Metaphysics of the Vedanta. This publication which also translated the Vakyasudha or (Drigdrishyaviveka) was deeply influential in cementing a broad popular association between the term Raja Yoga, Shankaracharya and Vendantic metaphycis.

A later major twentieth-centruy edition, containing the Sanskrit text, an English translation, and detailed comments by Swami Vimuktananda, was published in Mayavati, Almora, in 1938, under the title Aparokshanubhuti or Self-realization of Sankaracharya.

In 1995, Lance Nelson pointed out that the disregard for physical objects all the way down to plants and minerals mentioned in the Aparokshanubhuti teaches the irrelevance of nature to spiritual life, serving as a significant counterpart to modern revisionist efforts that seek to find an inherent environmentalist or nature-reverencing ethic in all historical Hindu scriptures.

== Sources ==
Printed sources

- Fort, Andrew (1996), "Liberation While Living in the Jivanmuktiviveka: Vidrayana's "Yogic Advaita", in Fort, Andrew O.; Mumme, Patricia Y. (eds.), Living Liberation in Hindu Thought, SUNY
- Fort, Andrew (1998), Jivanmukti in Transformation: Embodied Liberation in Advaita and Neo-Vedanta, State University of New York Press, ISBN 978-0791439043
- Madaio, James (24 May 2017). "Rethinking Neo-Vedānta: Swami Vivekananda and the Selective Historiography of Advaita Vedānta1". Religions. 8 (6): 101. doi:10.3390/rel8060101.
- Piantelly, M. (April 1977), "Sankara e la Renascita del Brahmanesimo", Indian Philosophical Quarterly, 4 (3)
- Vimuktananda, Swami (1993). Self-Realization. Advaita Ashrama.
