= Ramakrishna (disambiguation) =

Ramakrishna (1836–1886) or Sri Ramakrishna Paramahamsa was an Indian Hindu religious teacher and mystic.

Ramakrishna or Rama Krishna may also refer to:

- Ramakrishna (2004 Kannada film), a 2004 Indian Kannada-language film
- Ramakrishna (2004 Tamil film), a 2004 Indian Tamil-language film
- Ramakrishna (Kannada actor) (born 1954), Indian actor in Kannada cinema
- Ramakrishna (Telugu actor) (1939–2001), Indian actor in Telugu cinema
- Rama Krishna Puram or R. K. Puram, an area of south Delhi, named after Ramakrishna
- Ramakrishna Ashram Marg metro station, of the Delhi Metro in Delhi, India
- Ramakrishna Studios, an Indian film production house
- Ramakrishna Order, a religious order founded by Ramakrishna
  - Ramakrishna Math, part of the Ramakrishna Order
    - Ramakrishna Temple, Belur, West Bengal, India
    - Ramakrishna Mission
- Sri Ramakrishna Engineering College, Coimbatore, Tamil Nadu, India
- Sri Sri Ramakrishna Kathamrita, a Bengali-language five-volume work about the teachings of Ramakrishna by Mahendranath Gupta

== People with the name ==
- Bhanumathi Ramakrishna (1925–2005), Indian actress
- Kodi Ramakrishna, Indian movie director and writer
- Nataraja Ramakrishna (1933–2011), Kuchipudi dance guru from Andhra Pradesh
- Olympe Ramakrishna (born 1986), Franco-Indian visual artist
- Swadeshabhimani Ramakrishna Pillai (1878–1916), Indian writer, journalist, newspaper editor, and political activist
- Tenali Ramakrishna (Garlapati Tenali Ramakrishna, Tenali Rama, Vikata Kavi), court poet and jester
- V. Ramakrishna (1947–2015), Telugu playback singer
- Velagapudi Ramakrishna (1896–1968), Indian civil servant and industrialist
- Burgula Ramakrishna Rao (1899–1967), Indian politician
- Koneru Ramakrishna Rao (born 1932), Indian philosopher, psychologist, parapsychologist, educationist, teacher, researcher and administrator
- P. S. Ramakrishna Rao (1918–1986), Indian Telugu film director
- Pratani Ramakrishna Goud, Indian Telugu film producer, director, screen play writer and distributor
- A. L. Ramakrishna Naicker, Indian politician
- K. R. Ramanathan (Kalpathi Ramakrishna Ramanathan, 1893–1984), Indian physicist and meteorologist
- Bob Rau (Bantwal Ramakrishna Rau, 1951–2002), Indian computer engineer
- A. R. Krishnashastry (Ambale Ramakrishna Krishnasastry, 1890–1968), Indian Kannada writer, researcher and translator
- Kadammanitta Ramakrishnan (M. R. Ramakrishna Panikkar, 1935–2008), Indian poet
- Ramakrishna Badiga (born 1942), Indian politician
- Ramakrishna Gopal Bhandarkar, Indian scholar and social reformer
- Ramakrishna Hegde (1926–2004), Indian politician
- Ramakrishna Ranga Rao of Bobbili (1901–1978), Indian politician
- Bhau Daji (Ramakrishna Vitthal Laud, 1822–1874), Indian physician and scholar
- Tanguturi Anjaiah (Ramakrishna Reddi Talla, 1919–1986), Indian politician
- R. B. Naik (Ramakrishna Beeranna Naik, 1904–1970), Indian politician

== See also ==
- Ramakrishna Mission Vidyalaya (disambiguation)
- Ramakrishna Mission Vidyapith (disambiguation)
- Ramakrishna Mission Ashrama, Narendrapur (disambiguation)
- Ramkisoen Dewdat Oedayrajsing Varma (1907–1968), Indo-Surinamese politician
