= Vivek =

Vivek (or Bibek/Bivek in some regions) is a masculine given name that is popular in South Asia, particularly in India and Nepal. It is of Sanskrit origin and means "wisdom" and/or "conscience".

Vivek may refer to:

== People ==
- Vivek (actor) (1961–2021), Indian Tamil film actor
- Vivek Borkar (born 1954), Indian electrical engineer and mathematician
- Vivek Chibber, American sociologist and Marxist theorist
- Vivek Dahiya (born 1984), Indian television actor
- Vivek Gupta (business executive) (born 1960s), Indian-born American businessman
- Vivek Harshan (born 1981), Indian Tamil film editor
- Vivek Kanthan (born 2009), American racing driver
- Vivek Kar, Bollywood composer
- Vivek Kundra (born 1974), US Federal CIO
- Vivek Lall (born 1969), Famous aerospace leader
- Vivek (lyricist) (born 1985), Indian Tamil film lyricist
- Vivek Mahbubani (born 1982), Hong Kong stand-up comedian
- Vivek–Mervin, are an Indian musical duo
- Vivek Murthy (born 1977), 19th Surgeon General of the United States
- Vivek Oberoi (born 1976), Bollywood actor
- Vivek Ramaswamy (born 1985), American politician, entrepreneur, and 2024 Presidential candidate
- Vivek Ranade (born 1963), Indian chemical engineer, entrepreneur and professor
- Vivek Ranadivé (born 1957), American CEO
- Vivek Shraya (born 1981), Canadian musician, writer, and visual artist
- Vivek Singh (disambiguation), several people
- Vivek Tiwary (born 1973), American Broadway theater producer and writer/producer of The Fifth Beatle graphic novel
- Vivek Wadhwa, Indian-American technology entrepreneur and an academic

== Characters ==
- Vivek (character of C.I.D.)

== Places ==
- Vivek Nagar
- Vivek Vihar

== Other uses ==
- Impatient Vivek, a 2011 Bollywood romantic comedy film
- Vivek Express, a chain of express trains on the Indian Railways network

== See also ==
- Dṛg-Dṛśya-Viveka, an Advaita Vedanta text attributed to Bĥaratī Tīrtha or Vidyaranya Swami
- Swami Vivekananda (disambiguation)
- Vivekanandan (disambiguation)
- Vivekachudamani, an eighth-century Sanskrit poem in dialogue form that addresses the development of viveka
- Viveka (disambiguation)
