= Ajātivāda =

Hindu philosophical concept

Ajātivāda (अजातिवाद) is the fundamental philosophical doctrine of the Advaitin Hindu philosopher Gauḍapāda. According to Gauḍapāda, the Absolute (Brahman) is not subject to birth, change, or death. The Absolute is ajā, the unborn eternal. The empirical world of appearances is considered unreal, and not absolutely existent.

Gauḍapāda's perspective is based on the Māṇḍūkya Upanishad, applying the philosophical concept of ajāta to the inquiry of Brahman, showing that Brahman wholly transcends the conventional understanding of being and becoming. The concept is also found in Mādhyamaka school of Buddhist philosophy, as the theory of nonorigination.

== Etymology ==
Ajātivāda:

- "A" means "not", or "non" as in Ahimsa, non-harm
- "Jāti" means "birth", "creation", or "change"; it may refer to physical birth, but also to the origin or change of mental phenomena
- "Vāda" means "doctrine"

Taken together "ajātivāda" means "The Doctrine of no-change" or "the Doctrine of no-origination".

The term "ajāta" is similar to the term "anutpāda" from Madhyamika Buddhism, which means "having no origin", "not coming into existence", "not taking effect", "non-production". (Note: Sanskrit Dictionary for Spoken Sanskrit, Anutpāda) This has led some scholars to believe that the concept of Ajātivāda itself could have been borrowed from Madhyamika Buddhism. However, it notably diverges from the main tenets of Buddhism, viz. Kśanikatva (momentariness) and Pratītyasamutpāda (dependent origination) which all schools of buddhist philosophy accept as foundational. This distinction is further confirmed by Gaudapada's rejection of Śūnyatā (non-self) in favor of Ātman (self).

== Usage ==
=== Gaudapada ===
"Ajātivāda" is the fundamental philosophical doctrine of Gaudapada. According to Gaudapada, the Absolute is not subject to birth, change and death. The Absolute is aja, the unborn eternal. The empirical world of appearances is considered Maya (unreal as it is transitory), and not absolutely existent.

According to Comans, Gaudapada's perspective is quite different from Madhyamika Buddhist philosophy. Gaudapada's perspective is based on the Māṇḍūkya Upanishad. In the Māṇḍūkya Karika, Gaudapada's commentary on the Māṇḍūkya Upanishad, Gaudapada sets forth his perspective. According to Gaudapada, Brahman cannot undergo alteration, so the phenomenal world cannot arise independently from Brahman. If the world cannot arise, yet is an empirical fact, then the world has to be an unreal (transitory) appearance of Brahman. And if the phenomenal world is a transitory appearance, then there is no real origination or destruction, only apparent origination or destruction. From the level of ultimate truth (paramārthatā), the phenomenal world is māyā, "illusion", apparently existing but ultimately not real.

In Gaudapada-Karika, chapter III, verses 46-48, he states that the quietened mind becomes one with Brahman and does not perceive any origination:

When the mind does not lie low, and is not again tossed about, then that being without movement, and not presenting any appearance, culminates into Brahman. Resting in itself, calm, with Nirvana, indescribable, highest happiness, unborn and one with the unborn knowable, omniscient they say. No creature whatever is born, no origination of it exists or takes place. This is that highest truth where nothing whatever is born.

— Gaudapada Karika, 3.46-48, Translated by RD Karmarkar

Acknowledging the strong Buddhist influences but arguing for the need of an "unchangeable permanent reality," Karmakar opines that the ajātivāda of Gaudhapada has nothing in common with the Sūnyavāda concept in Buddhism. While the language of Gaudapada is undeniably similar to those found in Mahayana Buddhism, Coman states that their perspective is different because unlike Buddhism, Gaudapada is relying on the premise of "Brahman, Atman or Turiya" existing and being the nature of absolute reality.

=== Ramana Maharshi ===
Ramana Maharshi gave a translation in Tamil of Gaudapada’s Māṇḍūkya Upanishad Karika, chapter two, verse thirty-two:

There is no creation, no destruction, no bondage, no longing to be freed from bondage, no striving to be free [from bondage], nor anyone who has attained [freedom from bondage]. Know that this is the ultimate truth. (Note: David Godman, Ajata) (Note: David Godman: "This rendering appears as ‘Stray verse nine’ in Collected Works and as ‘Bhagavan 28’ in Guru Vachaka Kovai. Variations of this verse can also be found in the Amritabindu Upanishad (verse 10), Atma Upanishad (verse 30) and Vivekachudamani (verse 574).")

According to David Godman, the ajata doctrine implies that since the world was never created, there are also no jivas within it who are striving for or attaining liberation. Ramana Maharshi regarded this as "the ultimate truth."

== Levels of truth ==
Advaita took over from the Madhyamika the idea of levels of reality. Usually two levels are being mentioned, namely saṃvṛti-satya, "the empirical truth", (Note: Encyclopædia Britannica, saṃvṛti-satya) and paramārtha-satya, "ultimate truth". According to Plott,

"Ajativada is nothing but [an] extreme and exhaustive application of an extreme version of the distinction between the paramartha satya and the samvrtti satya."

The distinction between the two truths (satyadvayavibhāga) was fully expressed by the Madhyamaka-school. In Nāgārjuna's Mūlamadhyamakakārikā it is used to defend the identification of dependent origination (pratītyasamutpāda) with emptiness (śūnyatā):

The Buddha's teaching of the Dharma is based on two truths: a truth of worldly convention and an ultimate truth. Those who do not understand the distinction drawn between these two truths do not understand the Buddha's profound truth. Without a foundation in the conventional truth the significance of the ultimate cannot be taught. Without understanding the significance of the ultimate, liberation is not achieved.

Shankara uses sublation as the criterion to postulate an ontological hierarchy of three levels: (Note: advaita-vision.org, Discrimination)

1. Pāramārthika (paramartha, absolute), the absolute level, "which is absolutely real and into which both other reality levels can be resolved". This experience can't be sublated by any other experience.
2. Vyāvahārika (vyavahara), or samvriti-saya (empirical or pragmatical), "our world of experience, the phenomenal world that we handle every day when we are awake". It is the level in which both jiva (living creatures or individual souls) and Iswara are true; here, the material world is also true.
3. Prāthibhāsika (pratibhasika, apparent reality, unreality), "reality based on imagination alone". It is the level in which appearances are actually false, like the illusion of a snake over a rope, or a dream.

It is at the level of the highest truth (paramārtha) that there is no origination. Gaudapada states that, from the absolute standpoint, not even "non-dual" exists.

== Advaita Vedanta and Madhyamaka Buddhism ==
Many scholars, states Richard King, designate Madhyamaka Buddhism as Ajativada. The concept Ajati, he adds, exists in both Vedanta and Buddhism, but they are different in the following way:

1. "There is no birth." (Madhyamaka), and 2. "There is an Unborn." (Advaita Vedānta.)

Ajativada in Madhyamaka refers to its doctrine that things neither originate nor is there cessation. This is also called the theory of non-origination of Madhyamaka.

== See also ==
- Anutpada
- Apeiron
- Rigpa
- Dŗg-Dŗśya-Viveka

== Sources ==
=== Printed sources ===
- Analayo (2007), "Rebirth and the Gandhabba" (PDF), Journal of Buddhist Studies 1: 91-105
- Bhattacharya, Vidhushekhara (1943), Gauḍapādakārikā, Delhi: Motilal Banarsidass
- Comans, Michael (2000), The Method of Early Advaita Vedānta: A Study of Gauḍapāda, Śaṅkara, Sureśvara, and Padmapāda, Delhi: Motilal Banarsidass
- Garfield, Jay L. (1995), The Fundamental Wisdom of the Middle Way: Nagarjuna's Mulamadhyamakakarika, Oxford University Press
- Hiriyanna, M. (2000), The Essentials of Indian Philosophy, Motilal Banarsidass, ISBN 978-8120813304
- King, Richard (1995), Early Advaita Vedanta and Buddhism: The Mahayana Context of the Gaudapadiya-Karika, SUNY Press
- Murti, T.R.V. (2008), The Central Philosophy of Buddhism: A Study of the Madhyamika System, Taylor & Francis Group
- Plott, John C. (1980), Global History of Philosophy: The Patristic-Sutra Period, Volume 3, Delhi: Motilal Banarsidass
- Puligandla, Ramakrishna (1997), Fundamentals of Indian Philosophy, New Delhi: D.K. Printworld (P) Ltd.
- Dasgupta, Surendranath (1922), A History of Indian Philosophy, Volume 1, Cambridge, UK: Cambridge University Press
- Karmarkar, Raghunath (1953), Gaudpāda-Kārikā, Poona: Bhaskar Oriental Research Institute
- D., Pramitha (2013), Conceptual Interrelatedness in Ksanikavada and Svabhavoparamavada, Kerala: International Journal of Scientific and Research Publications, Volume 3, Issue 4
- Renard, Philip (2010), Non-Dualisme. De directe bevrijdingsweg, Cothen: Uitgeverij Juwelenschip
- Sarma, Chandradhar (1996), The Advaita Tradition in Indian Philosophy, Delhi: Motilal Banarsidass
