= Ramakrishna Mission Vidyapith =

Ramakrishna Mission Vidyapith may refer to these schools in India run by the Ramakrishna Mission:

- Ramakrishna Mission Vidyapith, Purulia, West Bengal
- Ramakrishna Mission Vidyapith, Deoghar, Jharkhand
- Ramakrishna Mission Vidyapith, Indore, Madhya Pradesh

== See also ==
- Ramakrishna (disambiguation)
- Ramakrishna Mission Vidyalaya (disambiguation)
