= Anutpada =

Buddhist concept for the absence of an origin

Anutpāda (Sanskrit: अनुत्पाद) is a Buddhist concept for the absence of an origin. In Mahayana Buddhism, "anutpāda" is often symbolized by the letter A.

== Etymology ==
"Anutpāda" means "having no origin", "not coming into existence", "not taking effect", "non-production".

- "An" also means "not", or "non"
- "Utpāda" means "genesis", "coming forth", "birth"

== Usage in Buddhist tradition ==
The Buddhist tradition uses the term "anutpāda" for the absence of an origin or sunyata (voidness). Atiśa:

One may wonder, "From where did all this come in the first place, and to where does it depart now?" Once examined in this way, [one sees that] it neither comes from anywhere nor departs to anywhere. All inner and outer phenomena are just like that. (Note: Brunholzl quotes Atisha's Centrist Pith Instructions, Called The Open jewel Casket.) (Note: Compare the Upanishads, for example the Mundaka Upanishad, where the same question is being asked, but where the answer is that Brahman is the origin of All.)

Chandrakirti, in his Yuktisastikavrrti, states:

Nagarjuna taught, "bereft of beginning, middle, and end," meaning that the world is free from creation, duration, and destruction.

According to Nakamura in his study of Advaita Vedanta, the Buddhist paramārtha, "highest truth", is identified with anutpāda The term paramārtha is a synonym for tattva, tathata, sunyata, animitta, bhutakoti and dharmadhatu. One who understands sunyata, anutpada and dependent arising, has realized the ultimate truth and gains nirvana. Nagarjuna:

[67] Nothing exists by virtue of own-being, nor is there any non-being here. Being and non-being, born through causes and conditions, are empty.

[68] Since all things are empty of own-being, the incomparable Tathagata teaches dependent co-origination regarding things.
[69] The ultimate meaning consists in that! The perfect Buddhas, the Bhagavats, have [only] conceived the entire multiplicity in reliance upon worldly convention.
[70] The worldly norms [dharmas] are not violated. In reality [the Tathagata] has not taught the Dharma. Not understanding the Tathagata's words, [fools] fear this spotless discourse.
[71] The worldly principle, "This arises depending on that," is not violated. But since what is dependent lacks own-being, how can it exist? That is certain!
[72] One with faith who tries to seek the truth, one who considers this principle logically [and] relies [upon] the Dharma that is lacking all supports leaves behind existence and non-existence [and abides in] peace.

[73] When one understands that "This is a result of that" the nets of bad views all vanish. Undefiled, one abandons desire, delusion, and hatred and gains nirvana.

Anutpāda is one of the important features of the Prajñāpāramitā Sutras and Madhyamaka. (Note: Buswell, Robert; Lopez, Donald S. Jr., eds. (2014), The Princeton Dictionary of Buddhism, Princeton University Press pg. 945 "In the PRAJÑĀPĀRAMITĀ literature and the MADHYAMAKA school, the notion of production comes under specific criticism (see VAJRAKAṆĀ), with NĀGĀRJUNA famously asking, e.g., how an effect can be produced from a cause that is either the same as or different from itself. The prajñāpāramitā sūtras thus famously declare that all dharmas are actually ANUTPĀDA, or “unproduced.”") (Note: King, Richard (1995), Early Advaita Vedānta and Buddhism: The Mahāyāna Context of the Gauḍapādīya-kārikā, SUNY Press pg.113 "It is equally apparent that one of the important features of the Prajnaparamita position is that of the nonarising (anutpada) of dharmas.") The term is also used in the Lankavatara Sutra. According to D.T Suzuki, "anutpada" is not the opposite of "utpada", but transcends opposites. It is the seeing into the true nature of existence, the seeing that "all objects are without self-substance". Another well-known use is in Bankei's "Unborn".

== Influence on Gaudapada ==
Gaudapada-karika characterizes Brahman-Atman Absolute with the concept of "Ajātivāda". It is a fundamental philosophical doctrine of Gaudapada. In Gaudapada-Karika, chapter III, verses 46–48, Gaudapada states that Brahman never arises, is never born, is never unborn, it rests in itself:

When the mind does not lie low, and is not again tossed about, then that being without movement, and not presenting any appearance, culminates into Brahman. Resting in itself, calm, with Nirvana, indescribable, highest happiness, unborn and one with the unborn knowable, omniscient they say. No creature whatever is born, no origination of it exists or takes place. This is that highest truth where nothing whatever is born.

— Gaudapada Karika, 3.46-48, Translated by RD Karmarkar

According to Gaudapada, the Absolute has no origin, and is not subject to birth, change and death. The Absolute is aja, the unborn eternal. The empirical world of appearances is considered Maya (unreal, changing, transitory), and not ontologically independent reality.

Gaudapada's concept of "ajāta" is similar to Nagajurna's Madhyamaka philosophy. The Buddhist tradition usually uses the term "anutpāda" for the absence of an origin or śūnyatā.

But Gaudapada's perspective is quite different from Nagarjuna. Gaudapada's perspective is based on the Mandukya Upanishad. According to Gaudapada, Brahman cannot undergo alteration, so the phenomenal world cannot arise independently from Brahman. If the world cannot arise, yet is an empirical fact, than the world has to be an unreal (transitory) appearance of Brahman. And if the phenomenal world is a transitory appearance, then there is no real origination or destruction, only apparent origination or destruction. From the level of ultimate truth (paramārthatā) the phenomenal world is māyā, changing and not what it seems to be.

The Ajativada of Gaudapada, states Karmarkar, has nothing in common with the Sunyavada concept in Buddhism. While the language of Gaudapada is undeniably similar to those found in Mahayana Buddhism, Coman states that their perspective is different because unlike Buddhism, Gaudapada is relying on the premise of "Brahman, Atman or Turiya" is there and is of the nature of absolute reality.

== See also ==
- Pratītyasamutpāda
- Rigpa
- Ajātivāda
- A in Buddhism

== Sources ==
- Bhattacharya, Vidhushekhara (1943), Gauḍapādakārikā, Delhi: Motilal Banarsidass
- Brunholzl, Karl (2004), Center of the Sunlit Sky, Snowlion
- Comans, Michael (2000), The Method of Early Advaita Vedānta: A Study of Gauḍapāda, Śaṅkara, Sureśvara, and Padmapāda, Delhi: Motilal Banarsidass
- Dumoulin, Heinrich (2005), Zen Buddhism: A History. Volume 2: Japan, World Wisdom Books, ISBN 9780941532907
- Eckel, Malcolm David (1994), To See the Buddha: A Philosopher's Quest for the Meaning of Emptiness, Princeton University Press
- Hiriyanna, Mysore (2000). The essentials of Indian philosophy. Delhi: Motilal Banarsidass Publishers. ISBN 978-8120813304.
- King, Richard (1 January 1995). Early Advaita Vedanta and Buddhism: The Mahayana Context of the Gaudapadiya-Karika. SUNY Press. ISBN 978-0-7914-2513-8.
- Nakamura, Hajime (2004), A History of Early Vedanta Philosophy. Part Two, Delhi: Motilal Banarsidass Publishers Private Limited
- Odin, Steve (1982), Process Metaphysics and Hua-Yen Buddhism: A Critical Study of Cumulative Penetration Vs. Interpretation, SUNY Press
- Renard, Philip (2010), Non-Dualisme. De directe bevrijdingsweg, Cothen: Uitgeverij Juwelenschip
- Sarma, Chandradhar (1996), The Advaita Tradition in Indian Philosophy, Delhi: Motilal Banarsidass
- Suzuki, Daisetz Teitarō (1999), Studies in the Laṅkāvatāra Sūtra, Delhi: Motilal Banarsidass
