= Śūnyatā =

Philosophical concept of emptiness found in Asian religions

Translations of Śūnyatā
- English: emptiness, voidness, vacuity, openness, thusness, nothingness
- Sanskrit: Śūnyatā (Devanagari: शून्यता)
- Pali: Suññatā (Devanagari: सुञ्ञता)
- Bengali: শূন্যতা (Śūnnôtā)
- Burmese: သုညတ (thone nya ta)
- Chinese: 空 (Pinyin: Kōng)
- Japanese: 空 (Rōmaji: Kū)
- Kashmiri: شُنؠتھ (Śunyath)
- Khmer: សុញ្ញតា (UNGEGN: Sŏnhnhôta)
- Korean: 공성 (空性) (RR: gong-seong)
- Mongolian: хоосон
- Sinhala: Shunyatā (Sinhala: ශුන්‍යතා)
- Tagalog: Sunyata (ᜐᜓᜈ᜔ᜌᜆ)
- Tibetan: སྟོང་པ་ཉིད་ (Wylie: stong-pa nyid THL: tongpa nyi)
- Thai: สุญตา (S̄uỵtā)

Śūnyatā (/ʃuːnjəˈtɑː/ shoon-yə-TAH; Sanskrit: शून्यता; Pali: suññatā lit. "emptiness", "voidness", "vacuity") is an Indian philosophical concept in Buddhism, Jainism, Hinduism, and other Indian philosophical traditions. The concept has multiple meanings depending on its doctrinal context: an ontological feature of reality, a meditative state, or a phenomenological analysis of experience.

In Theravāda Buddhism, Pali: suññatā often refers to the non-self (Pāli: anattā, Sanskrit: anātman) (Note: A common translation is "no-self", without a self, but the Pāli Canon uses anattā as a singular substantive, meaning "not-self".) nature of the five aggregates of experience and the six sense spheres. Pali: Suññatā is also often used to refer to a meditative state or experience.

In Mahāyāna Buddhism, śūnyatā refers to the tenet that "all things are empty of intrinsic existence and nature (svabhava)", but may also refer to the Buddha-nature teachings and primordial or empty awareness, as in Dzogchen, Shentong, or Chan.

== Etymology ==
Śūnyatā is usually translated as "devoidness", "emptiness", "hollow", "hollowness", "voidness". It is the noun form of the adjective śūnya, plus -tā:

- śūnya, in the context of Buddhadharma, primarily means "empty", or "void", but also means "zero", and "nothing".
- -tā is a suffix denoting a quality or state of being, equivalent to English "-ness"

== Development of the concept ==
The concept of śūnyatā as "emptiness" is related to the concept of anatta in early Buddhism. Over time, many different philosophical schools or tenet-systems (Sanskrit: siddhānta) have developed within Buddhism in an effort to explain the exact philosophical meaning of emptiness.

After the Buddha, emptiness was further developed by the Abhidharma schools, Nāgārjuna and the Mādhyamaka school, an early Mahāyāna school. Emptiness ("positively" interpreted) is also an important element of the Buddha-nature literature, which played a formative role in the evolution of subsequent Mahāyāna doctrine and practice.

== Early Buddhism ==
=== Pāli Nikāyas ===
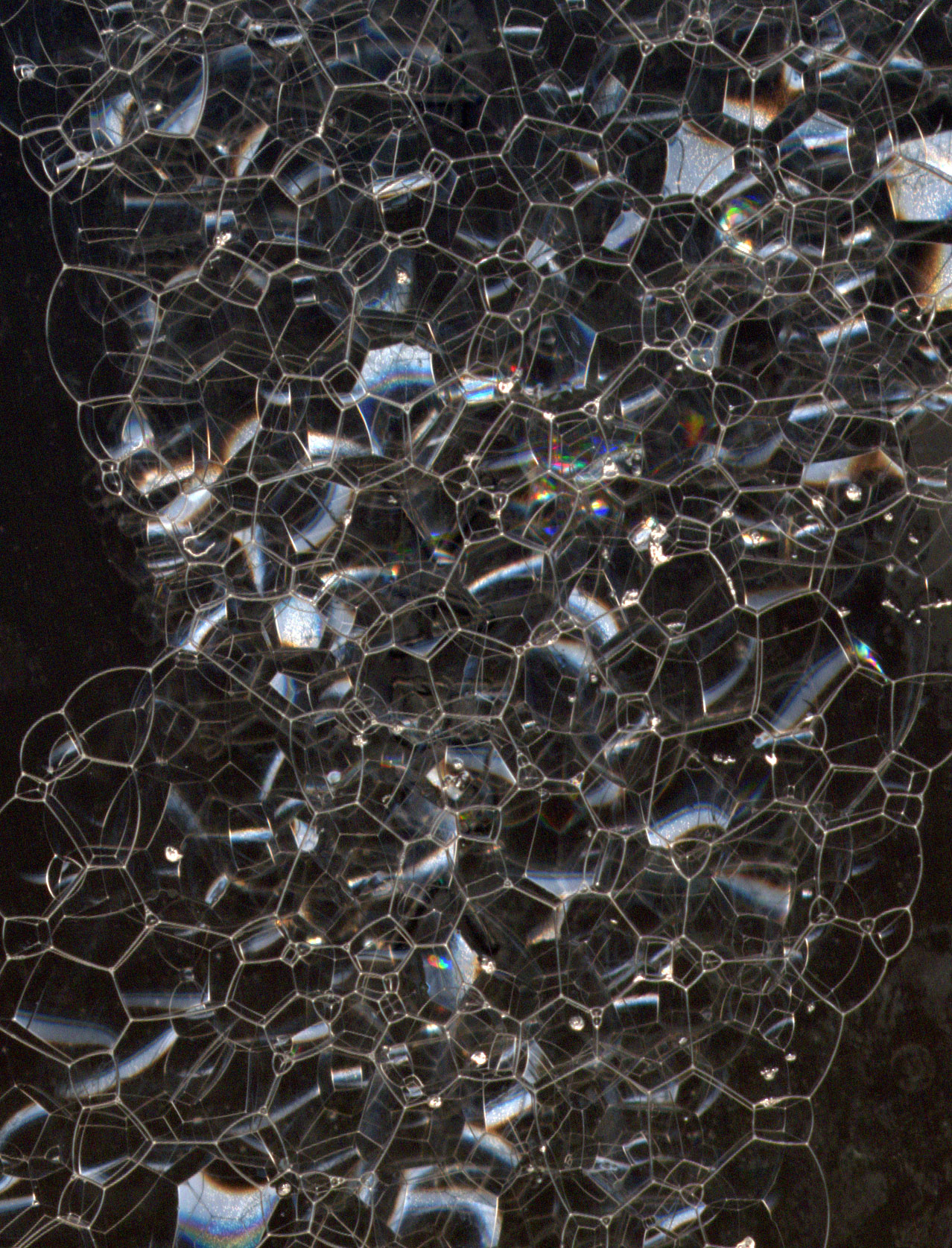
A simile from the Pali scriptures (SN 22.95) compares form and feelings with foam and bubbles.

The Pāli Canon uses the term śūnyatā ("emptiness") in three ways: as a meditative dwelling; as an attribute of objects; and as a type of awareness-release.

According to Bhikkhu Analayo, in the Pāli Canon "the adjective suñña occurs with a much higher frequency than the corresponding noun suññatā" and emphasizes seeing phenomena as 'being empty' instead of an abstract idea of "emptiness".

One example of this usage is in the Pheṇapiṇḍūpama Sutta (SN 22:95), which states that on close inspection, each of the five aggregates are seen as being void (rittaka), hollow (tucchaka), coreless (asāraka). In the text a series of contemplations is given for each aggregate: form is like "a lump of foam" (pheṇapiṇḍa); sensation like "a water bubble" (bubbuḷa); perception like "a mirage" (marici); formations like "a plantain tree" (kadalik-khandha); and cognition like "a magical illusion" (māyā).

According to Shi Huifeng, the terms "void" (rittaka), "hollow" (tucchaka), and "coreless" (asāraka) are also used in the early texts to refer to words and things which are deceptive, false, vain, and worthless. This sense of worthlessness and vacuousness is also found in other uses of the term māyā, such as the following:

"Monks, sensual pleasures are impermanent, hollow, false, deceptive; they are illusory (māyākatame), the prattle of fools."

The Suñña Sutta, part of the Pāli Canon, relates that the monk Ānanda, Buddha's attendant, asked,

It is said that the world is empty, the world is empty, lord. In what respect is it said that the world is empty?" The Buddha replied, "In so far as it is empty of a self or of anything pertaining to a self: Thus it is said, Ānanda, that the world is empty."

According to the American monastic Thanissaro Bhikku:

Emptiness as a quality of dharmas, in the early canons, means simply that one cannot identify them as one's own self or having anything pertaining to one's own self ... Emptiness as a mental state, in the early canons, means a mode of perception in which one neither adds anything to nor takes anything away from what is present, noting simply, "There is this." This mode is achieved through a process of intense concentration, coupled with the insight that notes more and more subtle levels of the presence and absence of disturbance (see MN 121).

==== Meditative state ====
Emptiness as a meditative state is said to be reached when "not attending to any themes, he [the bhikkhu] enters & remains in internal emptiness" (MN 122). This meditative dwelling is developed through the "four formless states" of meditation or Arūpajhānas and then through "themeless concentration of awareness".

The Cūlasuññata-sutta (MN III 104) and the Mahāsuññata-sutta (MN III 109) outline how a monk can "dwell in emptiness" through a gradual step-by-step mental cultivation process, they both stress the importance of the impermanence of mental states and the absence of a self.

In the Kāmabhu Sutta S IV.293, it is explained that a bhikkhu can experience a trancelike contemplation in which perception and feeling cease. When he emerges from this state, he recounts three types of "contact" (phasso):

1. "emptiness" (suññato),
2. "signless" (animitto),
3. "undirected" (appaṇihito).

The meaning of emptiness as contemplated here is explained at M I.297 and S IV.296-97 as the "emancipation of the mind by emptiness" (suññatā cetovimutti) being consequent upon the realization that "this world is empty of self or anything pertaining to self" (suññam idaṃ attena vā attaniyena vā).

The term "emptiness" (suññatā) is also used in two suttas in the Majjhima Nikāya, in the context of a progression of mental states. The texts refer to each state's emptiness of the one below.

=== Chinese Āgamas ===
The Chinese Āgamas contain various parallels to the Pheṇapiṇḍūpama Sutta. One partial parallel from the Ekottarika Āgama describes the body with different metaphors: "a ball of snow", "a heap of dirt", "a mirage", "an illusion" (māyā), or "an empty fist used to fool a child". In a similar vein, the Mūlasarvāstivādin Māyājāla Sūtra, gives two sets of metaphors for each of the sensory consciousnesses to illustrate their vain, illusory character.

Other Mūlasarvāstivāda Āgama sūtras (extant in Chinese) which have emptiness as a theme include Samyukta Āgama 335 - Paramārtha-śunyatā-sūtra ("Sutra on ultimate emptiness") and Samyukta Āgama 297 - Mahā-śunyatā-dharma-paryāya ("Greater discourse on emptiness"). These sutras have no parallel Pāli suttas. These sūtras associate emptiness with dependent origination, which shows that this relation of the two terms was already established in pre-Nāgārjuna sources. The sūtra on great emptiness states:

"What is the Dharma Discourse on Great Emptiness? It is this—'When this exists, that exists; when this arises, that arises.'"

The phrase "when this exists ..." is a common gloss on dependent origination. Sarvāstivādin Āgamas also speak of a certain "emptiness samadhi" (śūnyatāsamādhi) as well as stating that all dharmas are "classified as conventional".

Mun-Keat Choong and Yin Shun have both published studies on the various uses of emptiness in the Early Buddhist texts (Pāli Canon and Chinese Āgamas). Choong has also published a collection of translations of Āgama sūtras from the Chinese on the topic of emptiness.

== Early Buddhist schools and Abhidharma ==
Many of the early Buddhist schools featured śūnyatā as an important part of their teachings.

The Sarvastivadin school's Abhidharma texts like the Dharmaskandhapāda Śāstra, and the later Mahāvibhāṣa, also take up the theme of emptiness vis-a-vis dependent origination as found in the Agamas.

Schools such as the Mahāsāṃghika Prajñaptivādins as well as many of the Sthavira schools (except the Pudgalavada) held that all dharmas were empty (dharma śūnyatā). This can be seen in the early Theravada Abhidhamma texts such as the Patisambhidamagga, which also speak of the emptiness of the five aggregates and of svabhava as being "empty of essential nature". The Theravada Kathavatthu also argues against the idea that emptiness is unconditioned. The Mahāvastu, an influential Mahāsāṃghika work, states that the Buddha

"has shown that the aggregates are like a lightning flash, as a bubble, or as the white foam on a wave."

One of the main themes of Harivarman's Tattvasiddhi-Śāstra (3rd-4th century) is dharma-śūnyatā, the emptiness of phenomena.

== Theravāda ==
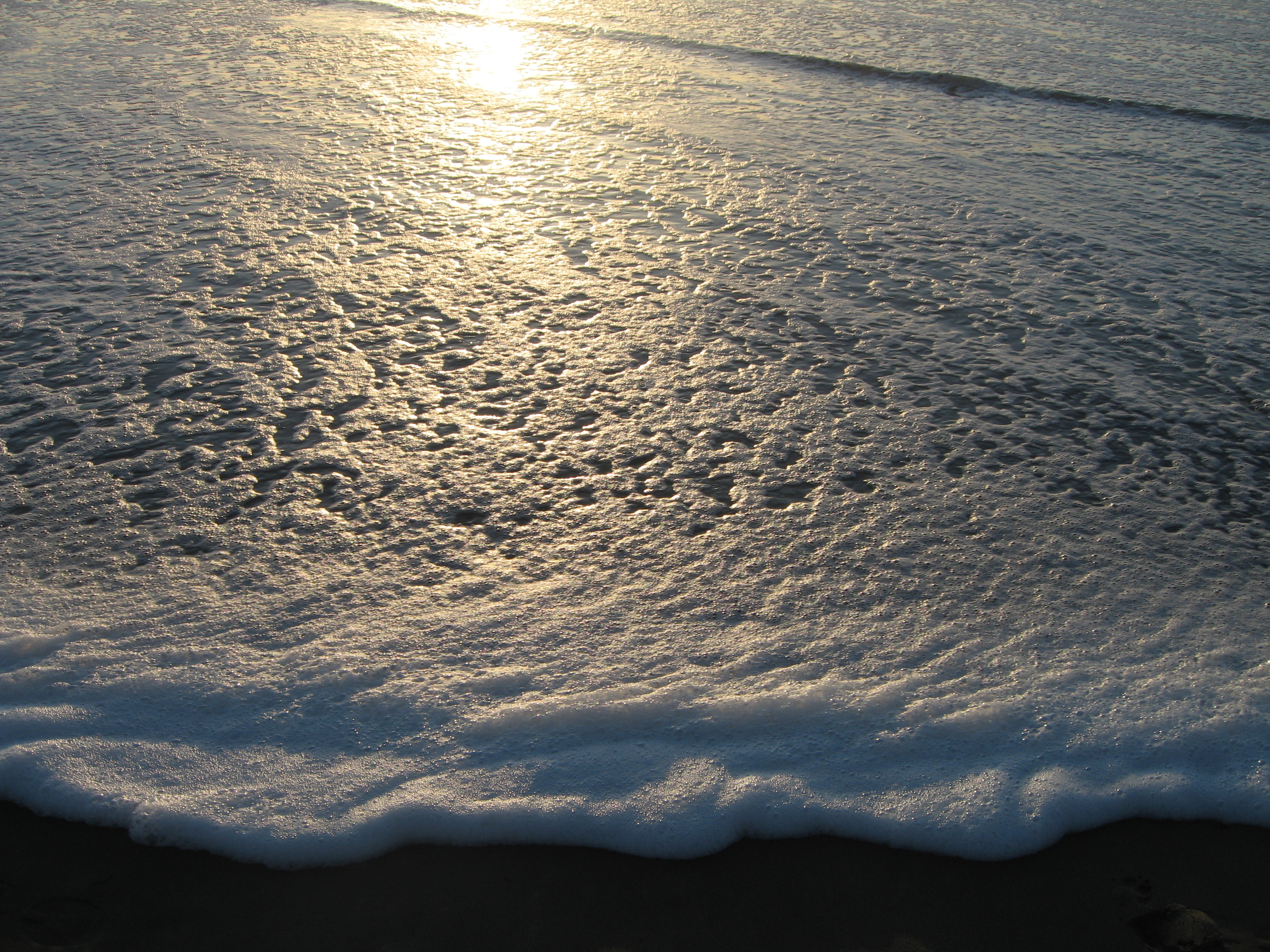
Sea froth at sunset

Theravāda Buddhists generally take the view that emptiness is merely the not-self nature of the five aggregates. According to Insight meditation teacher Gil Fronsdal, emptiness is an important door to liberation in the Theravāda tradition just as it is in Mahayana. The classic Theravāda text known as the Patisambhidamagga (c. 3rd century BCE) describes the five aggregates as being empty (suññam) of essence or intrinsic nature (sabhava). The Patisambhidamagga also equates not-self with the emptiness liberation in a passage also cited by Buddhaghosa in the Visuddhimagga (Vism XXI 70):

"When one who has great wisdom brings [volitional formations] to mind as not-self, he acquires the emptiness liberation" -Patis. II 58.

The Visuddhimagga (c. 5th century CE), the most influential classical Theravāda treatise, states that not-self does not become apparent because it is concealed by "compactness" when one does not give attention to the various elements which make up the person. The Paramatthamañjusa Visuddhimaggatika of Acariya Dhammapala, a 5th-century Theravāda commentary on the Visuddhimagga, comments on this passage by referring to the fact that we often assume unity and compactness regarding phenomena or functions which are instead made up of various elements, but when one sees that these are merely empty dhammas, one can understand the not-self characteristic:

"when they are seen after resolving them by means of knowledge into these elements, they disintegrate like froth subjected to compression by the hand. They are mere states (dhamma) occurring due to conditions and void. In this way the characteristic of not-self becomes more evident."

The modern Thai teacher Buddhadasa referred to emptiness as the "innermost heart" of the Buddhist teachings and the cure for the disease of suffering. He stated that emptiness, as it relates to the practice of Dhamma, can be seen both "as the absence of Dukkha and the defilements that are the cause of Dukkha and as the absence of the feeling that there is a self or that there are things which are the possessions of a self." He also equated nibbana with emptiness, writing that "Nibbana, the remainderless extinction of Dukkha, means the same as supreme emptiness." Emptiness is also seen as a mode of perception which lacks all the usual conceptual elaborations we usually add on top of our experiences, such as the sense of "I" and "Mine". According to Thanissaro Bhikku, emptiness is not so much a metaphysical view, as it is a strategic mode of acting and of seeing the world which leads to liberation:

Emptiness is a mode of perception, a way of looking at experience. It adds nothing to and takes nothing away from the raw data of physical and mental events. You look at events in the mind and the senses with no thought of whether there's anything lying behind them. This mode is called emptiness because it's empty of the presuppositions we usually add to experience to make sense of it: the stories and world-views we fashion to explain who we are and the world we live in. Although these stories and views have their uses, the Buddha found that some of the more abstract questions they raise — of our true identity and the reality of the world outside — pull attention away from a direct experience of how events influence one another in the immediate present. Thus they get in the way when we try to understand and solve the problem of suffering.

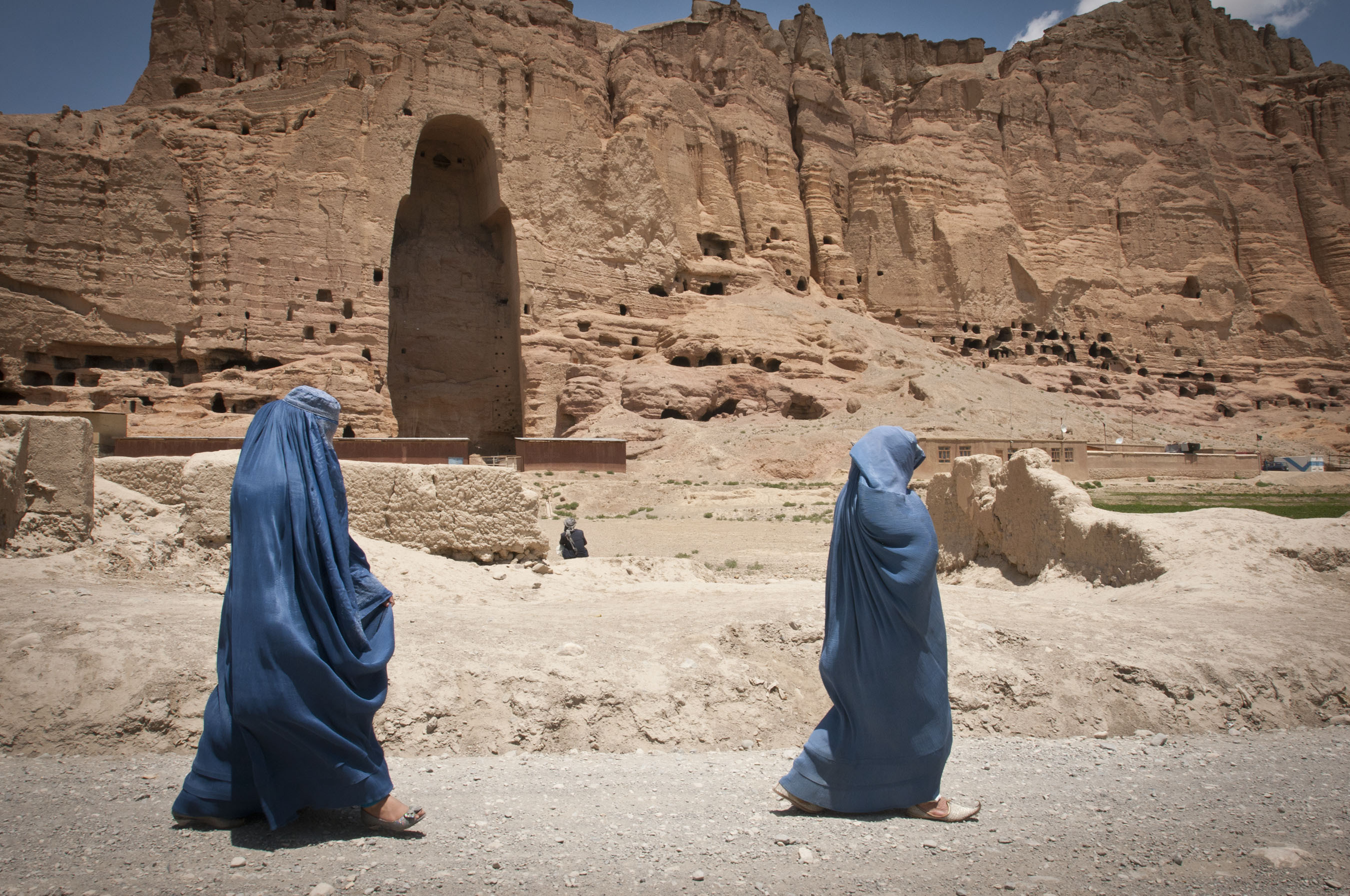
The empty space where the Western Buddha of Bamiyan resided prior to being destroyed by the Taliban

Some Theravādins, such as David Kalupahana, see Nagarjuna's view of emptiness as compatible with the Pali Canon. In his analysis of the Mulamadhyamikakarika, Kalupahana sees Nagarjuna's argument as rooted in the Kaccānagotta Sutta (which Nagarjuna cites by name). Kalupahana states that Nagarjuna's major goal was to discredit heterodox views of Svabhava (own-nature) held by the Sarvastivadins and establish the non-substantiality of all dharmas. According to Peter Harvey, the Theravāda view of dhammas and sabhava is not one of essences, but merely descriptive characteristics and hence is not the subject of Madhyamaka critique developed by Nagarjuna (see below).

In Theravāda, emptiness as an approach to meditation is also seen as a state in which one is "empty of disturbance." This form of meditation is one in which meditators become concentrated and focus on the absence or presence of disturbances in their minds; if they find a disturbance they notice it and allow it to drop away; this leads to deeper states of calmness. Emptiness is also seen as a way to look at sense-experience that does not identify with the "I-making" and "my-making" process of the mind. As a form of meditation, this is developed by perceiving the six sense-spheres and their objects as empty of any self, this leads to a formless jhana of nothingness and a state of equanimity.

Mathew Kosuta sees the Abhidhamma teachings of the modern Thai teacher Ajaan Sujin Boriharnwanaket as being similar to the Mahayana emptiness view.

== Mahayana Buddhism ==
There are two main sources of Indian Buddhist discussions of emptiness: the Mahayana sutra literature, which is traditionally believed to be the word of the Buddha in Mahayana Buddhism, and the shastra literature, which was composed by Buddhist scholars and philosophers.

=== Prajñāpāramitā sūtras ===
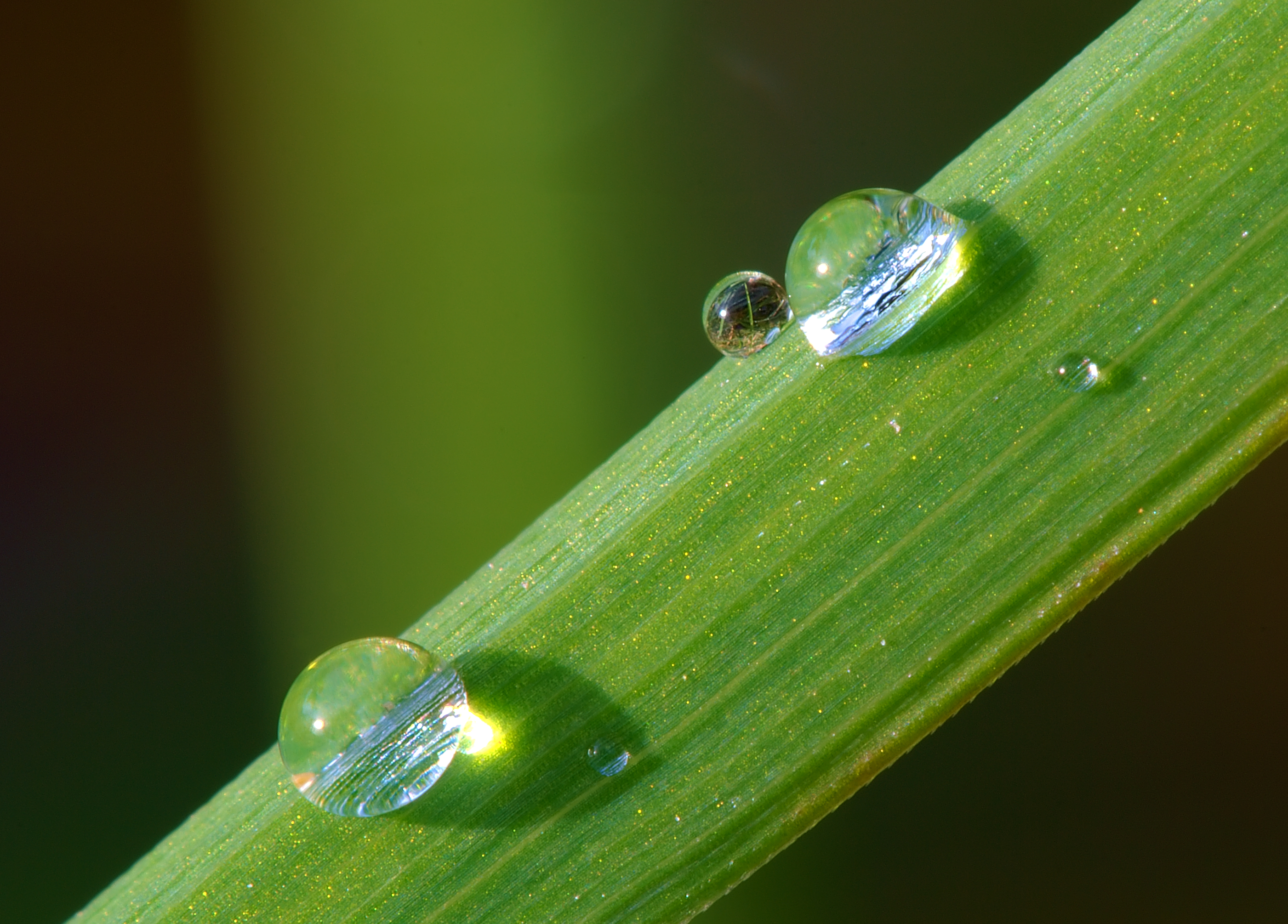
In the Prajñaparamita sutras, the emptiness of phenomena is often illustrated by metaphors like drops of dew.

The Prajñāpāramitā (Perfection of Wisdom) Sutras taught that all entities, including dharmas, are empty of self, essential core, or intrinsic nature (svabhava), being only conceptual existents or constructs. The notion of prajña (wisdom, knowledge) presented in these sutras is a deep non-conceptual understanding of emptiness. The Prajñāpāramitā sutras also use various metaphors to explain the nature of things as emptiness, stating that things are like "illusions" (māyā) and "dreams" (svapna). The Astasahasrika Prajñaparamita, possibly the earliest of these sutras, states:

If he knows the five aggregates as like an illusion, But makes not illusion one thing, and the aggregates another; If, freed from the notion of multiple things, he courses in peace— Then that is his practice of wisdom, the highest perfection.

Perceiving dharmas and beings like an illusion (māyādharmatām) is termed the "great armor" (mahāsaṃnaha) of the Bodhisattva, who is also termed the 'illusory man' (māyāpuruṣa). The Vajracchedikā Prajñāpāramitā Sūtra adds the following similes to describe how all conditioned things are to be contemplated: like a bubble, a shadow, like dew or a flash of lightning. In the worldview of these sutras, though we perceive a world of concrete and discrete objects, these objects are "empty" of the identity imputed by their designated labels. In that sense, they are deceptive and like an illusion. The Perfection of Wisdom texts constantly repeat that nothing can be found to ultimately exist in some fundamental way. This applies even to the highest Buddhist concepts (bodhisattvas, bodhicitta, and even prajña itself). Even nirvana itself is said to be empty and like a dream or magical illusion.

In a famous passage, the Heart sutra, a later but influential Prajñāpāramitā text, directly states that the five skandhas (along with the five senses, the mind, and the four noble truths) are said to be "empty" (sunya):

Form is emptiness, emptiness is form
Emptiness is not separate from form, form is not separate from emptiness
Whatever is form is emptiness, whatever is emptiness is form. (Note: Original: "Rupan śūnyatā śūnyatāiva rupan. Rupan na prithak śūnyatā śūnyatā na prithag rupan. Yad rupan sa śūnyatā ya śūnyatā tad rupan.") (Note: The Five Skandhas are: Form, Feeling, Perceptions, Mental Formations and Consciousness.)

In the Prajñāpāramitā sutras the knowledge of emptiness, i.e. prajñāpāramitā is said to be the fundamental virtue of the bodhisattva, who is said to stand on emptiness by not standing (-stha) on any other dharma (phenomena). Bodhisattvas who practice this perfection of wisdom are said to have several qualities such as the "not taking up" (aparigṛhīta) and non-apprehension (anupalabdhi) of anything, non-attainment (aprapti), not-settling down (anabhinivesa) and not relying on any signs (nimitta, mental impressions). Bodhisattvas are also said to be free of fear in the face of the ontological groundlessness of the emptiness doctrine which can easily shock others.

=== Mādhyamaka school ===
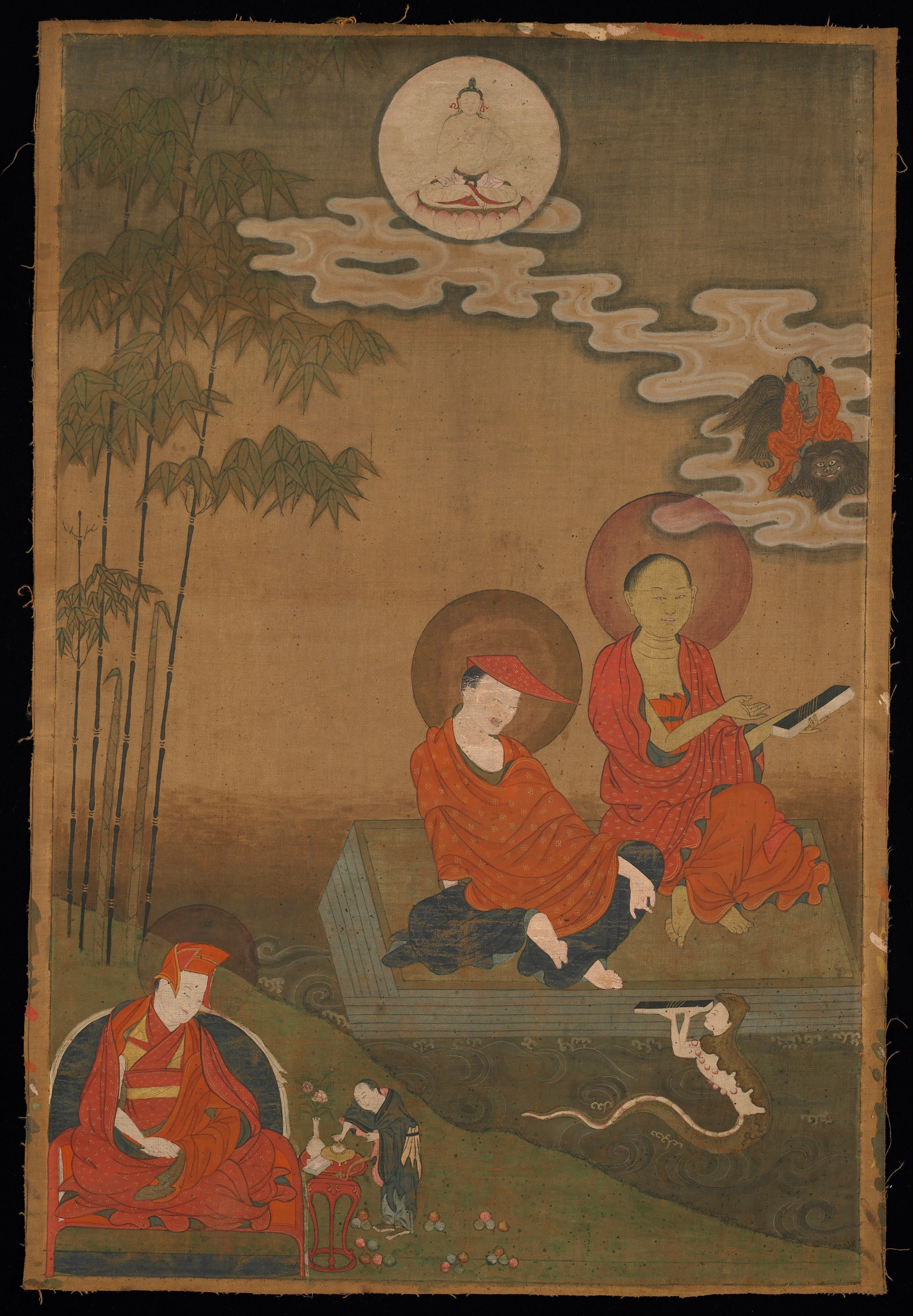
Nāgārjuna and Āryadeva, two classic Indian philosophers of the Buddhist emptiness doctrine

Mādhyamaka is a Mahāyāna Buddhist school of philosophy which focuses on the analysis of emptiness, and was thus also known as śūnyatavāda. The school is traditionally seen as being founded by the Indian Buddhist philosopher Nāgārjuna.

Nāgārjuna's goal was to refute the essentialism of certain Abhidharma schools and the Hindu Nyaya school. His best-known work is the Mūlamadhyamakakārikā (MMK), in which he used reductio arguments (Skt: prasanga) to show the non-substantiality of everything. Nāgārjuna equated the emptiness of dharmas with their dependent origination, and thus with their being devoid any permanent substance or primary, substantial existence (svabhava). (Note: Mūlamadhyamakakārikā 24:18) Nāgārjuna writes in the MMK:

We state that conditioned origination is emptiness. It is mere designation depending on something, and it is the middle path. (24.18)

Since nothing has arisen without depending on something, there is nothing that is not empty. (24.19)

Nāgārjuna's Mādhyamaka states that since things have the nature of lacking true existence or own being (niḥsvabhāva), all things are mere conceptual constructs (prajñaptimatra) because they are just impermanent collections of causes and conditions. Because of this, Mādhyamaka is also known as Niḥsvabhāvavāda. This also applies to the principle of causality itself, since everything is dependently originated. If one is unaware of this, things may seem to arise as existents, remain for a time and then subsequently perish. In reality, dependently originated phenomena do not arise or remain as inherently existent phenomena and yet they still appear as a flow of conceptual constructs. (Note: Chapter 21 of the Mūlamadhyamakakārikā goes into the reasoning behind this.) Thus both existence and nihilism are ruled out. Any enduring essential nature would prevent the process of dependent origination, or any kind of origination at all. For things would simply always have been, and will always continue to be, without any change. (Note: Nāgārjuna equates svabhāva (essence) with bhāva (existence) in Chapter 15 of the Mūlamadhyamakakārikā) For Nāgārjuna, the realization of emptiness is a key understanding which allows one to reach liberation because it is nothing but the elimination of ignorance.

There has been significant debate, both in ancient India and in modern scholarship, as to how to interpret Mādhyamaka and whether it is nihilistic (a claim that Mādhyamaka thinkers vehemently denied). Some scholars like F. Shcherbatskoy have also interpreted emptiness as described by Nāgārjuna as a Buddhist transcendental absolute, while other scholars such as David Kalupahana consider this interpretation to be a mistake. According to Paul Williams, Nāgārjuna associates emptiness with the ultimate truth but his conception of emptiness is not some kind of Absolute, but rather it is the very absence of true existence with regards to the conventional reality of things and events in the world.

For Nāgārjuna the phenomenal world is the limited truth (samvrtisatya) and does not really exist in the highest reality (paramarthasatya) and yet it has a kind of conventional reality which has its uses for reaching liberation. This limited truth includes everything, including the Buddha himself, the teachings (Dharma), liberation and even Nāgārjuna's own arguments. This two-truth schema which did not deny the importance of convention allowed him to defend himself against charges of nihilism. Because of his philosophical work, Nāgārjuna is seen by some modern interpreters as restoring the Middle Way of the Buddha, which had become influenced by absolutist metaphysical tendencies of schools like the Vaibhasika.

Nāgārjuna is also famous for arguing that his philosophy of emptiness was not a view, and that he in fact did not take any position or thesis whatsoever since this would just be another form of clinging. In his Vigrahavyavartani Nāgārjuna outright states that he has no thesis (pratijña) to prove. This idea would become a central point of debate for later Mādhyamaka philosophers. After Nāgārjuna, his pupil Āryadeva (3rd century CE) commented on and expanded Nāgārjuna's system. An influential commentator on Nāgārjuna was Buddhapālita (470–550) who has been interpreted as developing the 'prāsaṅgika' approach to Nāgārjuna's works, which argues that Madhyamaka critiques of essentialism are done only through reductio ad absurdum arguments. Like Nāgārjuna, instead of putting forth any positive position of his own, Buddhapālita merely seeks to show how all philosophical positions are untenable and self contradictory without putting forth a positive thesis.

Buddhapālita is often contrasted with the works of Bhāvaviveka (c. 500 – c. 578), who argued for the use of logical arguments using the pramana-based epistemology of Indian logicians like Dignāga. Bhāvaviveka argued that Madhyamika's could put forth positive arguments of one's own, instead of just criticizing others' arguments, a tactic called vitaṇḍā (attacking) which was seen in bad form in Indian philosophical circles. He argued that the position of a Mādhyamaka was simply that phenomena are devoid of inherent nature. This approach has been labeled the svātantrika style of Madhyamaka by Tibetan philosophers and commentators. Another influential commentator, Candrakīrti (c. 600–650), critiqued Bhāvaviveka's adoption of the pramana tradition on the grounds that it contained a subtle essentialism and argued that Mādhyamikas must make no positive assertions and need not construct formal arguments.

=== Yogācāra school ===
The central text of the Yogācāra school, the Saṃdhinirmocana-sūtra, explains emptiness in terms of the three natures theory, stating that its purpose is to "establish the doctrine of the three-own-beings (trisvabhāva) in terms of their lack of own-nature (niḥsvabhāvatā)." According to Andrew Skilton, in Yogācāra, emptiness is the "absence of duality between perceiving subject (lit. "grasper", Skt: grāhaka, Tib: 'dzin-pa) and the perceived object ("grasped", Skt: grāhya, Tib: bzhung-ba)." This is seen in the following quote from the Madhyāntavibhāga:

There exists the imagination of the unreal, there is no duality, but there is emptiness, even in this there is that.

In his commentary, the Indian Yogācāra philosopher Vasubandhu explains that imagination of the unreal (abhūta-parikalpa) is the "discrimination between the duality of grasped and grasper." Emptiness is said to be "the imagination of the unreal that is lacking in the form of being graspable or grasper." Thus in Yogacara, it can be said that emptiness is mainly that subject and object and all experiences which are seen in the subject–object modality are empty.

According to Yogācāra thought, everything we conceive of is the result of the working of the Eight Consciousnesses. (Note: Translations do differ, which makes a difference. Vijñāna can be translated as "consciousness", but also as "discernement".) The "things" we are conscious of are "mere concepts" (vijñapti), not 'the thing in itself'. In this sense, our experiences are empty and false, they do not reveal the true nature of things as an enlightened person would see them, which would be non-dual, without the imputed subject object distinction.

The Yogācāra school philosophers Asaṅga and Vasubandhu criticized those in the Madhyamika school who "adhere to non-existence" (nāstikas, vaināśkas) and sought to move away from their negative interpretation of emptiness because they feared any philosophy of 'universal denial' (sarva-vaināśika) would stray into 'nihilism' (ucchedavāda), an extreme which was not the middle way. Yogacarins differed from Madhyamikas in positing that there really was something which could be said to 'exist' in experience, namely some kind of nonobjective and empty perception. This Yogacara conception of emptiness, which states that there is something that exists (mainly, vijñapti, mental construction), and that it is empty, can be seen in the following statement of Vasubandhu:

Thus, when something is absent [in a receptacle], then one, seeing that [receptacle] as devoid of that thing, perceives that [receptacle] as it is, and recognises that [receptacle], which is left over, as it is, namely as something truly existing there.

This tendency can also be seen in Asaṅga, who argues in his Bodhisattvabhūmi that there must be something that exists which is described as empty:

Emptiness is logical when one thing is devoid of another because of that [other's] absence and because of the presence of the empty thing itself.

Asaṅga also states:

The nonexistence of duality is indeed the existence of nonexistence; this is the definition of emptiness. It is neither existence, nor nonexistence, neither different nor identical.

This "existence of nonexistence" definition of emptiness can also be seen in Asaṅga's Abhidharmasamuccaya where he states that emptiness is "the non-existence of the self, and the existence of the no-self."

In the sixth century, scholarly debates between Yogacarins and Madhyamikas centered on the status and reality of the paratantra-svabhāva (the "dependent nature"), with Madhyamika's like Bhāvaviveka criticizing the views of Yogacarins like Dharmapāla of Nalanda as reifying dependent origination.

=== Buddha-nature ===
An influential division of 1st-millennium CE Buddhist texts develop the notion of Tathāgatagarbha or Buddha-nature. The Tathāgatagarbha doctrine, at its earliest, probably appeared about the later part of the 3rd century CE, and is verifiable in Chinese translations of 1st millennium CE.

The Tathāgatagarbha is the topic of the Tathāgatagarbha sūtras, where the title itself means a garbha (womb, matrix, seed) containing Tathāgata (Buddha). In the Tathāgatagarbha sūtras the perfection of the wisdom of not-self is stated to be the true self. The ultimate goal of the path is characterized using a range of positive language that had been used in Indian philosophy previously by essentialist philosophers, but which was now transmuted into a new Buddhist vocabulary to describe a being who has successfully completed the Buddhist path.

These Sutras suggest, states Paul Williams, that 'all sentient beings contain a Tathāgata as their 'essence, core or essential inner nature'. They also present a further developed understanding of emptiness, wherein the Buddha-nature, the Buddha and Liberation are seen as transcending the realm of emptiness, i.e. of the conditioned and dependently originated phenomena.

One of these texts, the Angulimaliya Sutra, contrasts between empty phenomena such as the moral and emotional afflictions (kleshas), which are like ephemeral hailstones, and the enduring, eternal Buddha, which is like a precious gem:

The tens of millions of afflictive emotions like hail-stones are empty. The phenomena in the class of non-virtues, like hail-stones, quickly disintegrate. Buddha, like a vaidurya jewel, is permanent ... The liberation of a buddha also is form ... do not make a discrimination of non-division, saying, "The character of liberation is empty".'

The Śrīmālā Sūtra is one of the earliest texts on Tathāgatagarbha thought, composed in the 3rd century in south India, according to Brian Brown. It asserted that everyone can potentially attain Buddhahood, and warns against the doctrine of Śūnyatā. The Śrīmālā Sūtra posits that the Buddha-nature is ultimately identifiable as the supramundane nature of the Buddha, the garbha is the ground for Buddha-nature, this nature is unborn and undying, has ultimate existence, has no beginning nor end, is nondual, and permanent. The text also adds that the garbha has "no self, soul or personality" and "incomprehensible to anyone distracted by sunyata (voidness)"; rather it is the support for phenomenal existence.

The notion of Buddha-nature and its interpretation was and continues to be widely debated in all schools of Mahayana Buddhism. Some traditions interpret the doctrine to be equivalent to emptiness (like the Tibetan Gelug school); the positive language of the texts Tathāgatagarbha sutras are then interpreted as being of provisional meaning, and not ultimately true. Other schools, however (mainly the Jonang school), see Tathāgatagarbha as being an ultimate teaching and see it as an eternal, true self, while Śūnyatā is seen as a provisional, lower teaching.

Likewise, western scholars have been divided in their interpretation of the Tathāgatagarbha, since the doctrine of an 'essential nature' in every living being appears to be confusing, since it seems to be equivalent to a 'Self', (Note: Williams 2008, pp. 104–105, 108: "Some texts of the tathagatagarbha literature, such as the Mahaparinirvana Sutra actually refer to an atman, though other texts are careful to avoid the term. This would be in direct opposition to the general teachings of Buddhism on anatta. Indeed, the distinctions between the general Indian concept of atman and the popular Buddhist concept of Buddha-nature are often blurred to the point that writers consider them to be synonymous.") which seems to contradict the doctrines in a vast majority of Buddhist texts. Some scholars, however, view such teachings as metaphorical, not to be taken literally.

According to some scholars, the Buddha-nature which these sutras discuss does not represent a substantial self (ātman). Rather, it is a positive expression of emptiness, and represents the potentiality to realize Buddhahood through Buddhist practices. In this view, the intention of the teaching of Buddha-nature is soteriological rather than theoretical. According to others, the potential of salvation depends on the ontological reality of a salvific, abiding core reality – the Buddha-nature, empty of all mutability and error, fully present within all beings. Japanese scholars of the "Critical Buddhism" movement meanwhile see Buddha-nature as an essentialist and thus an un-Buddhist idea.

=== Tibetan Buddhism ===
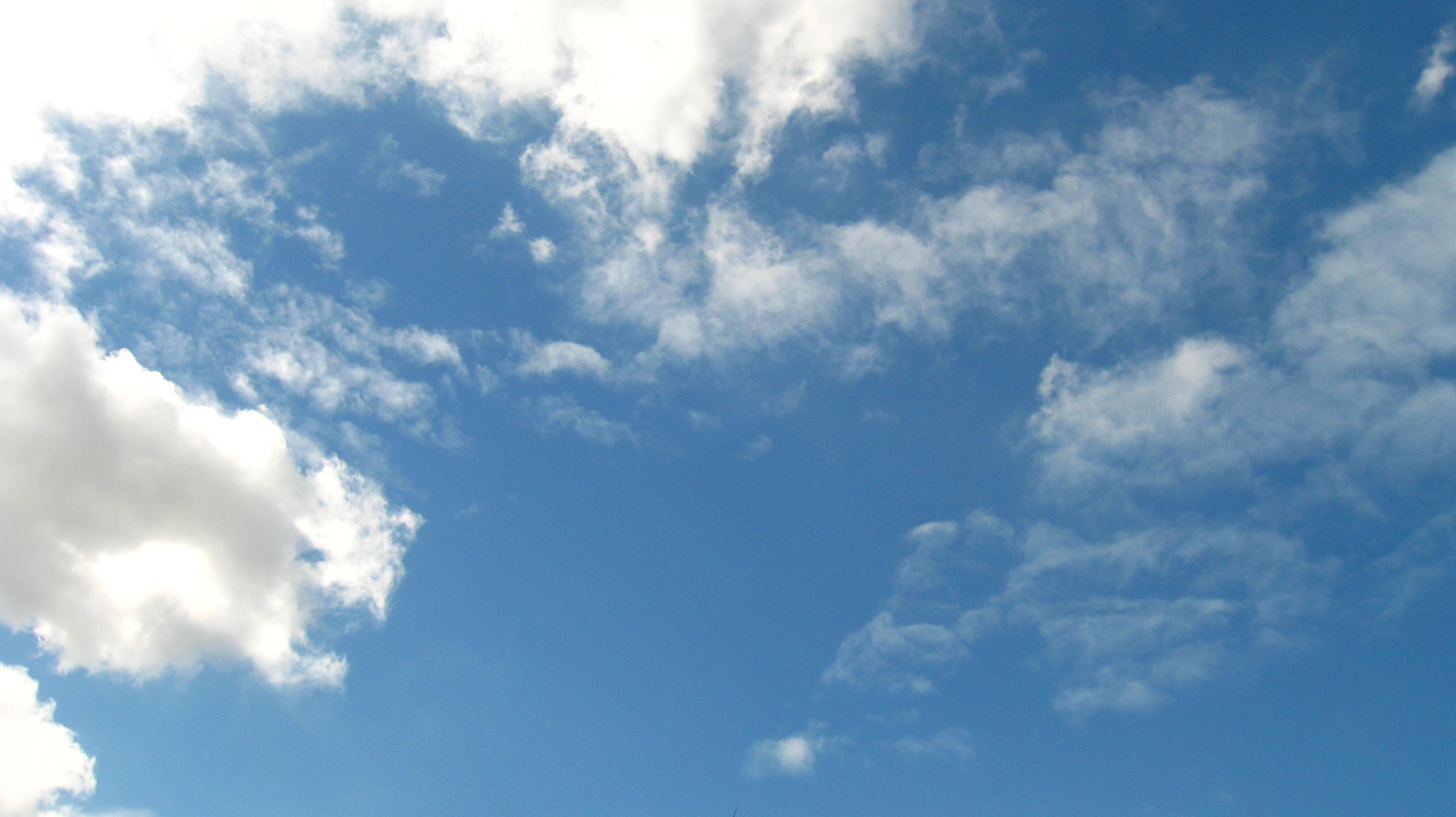
In Tibetan Buddhism, emptiness is often symbolized by and compared to the open sky which is associated with openness and freedom.

In Tibetan Buddhism, emptiness (Wylie: stong-pa nyid) is mainly interpreted through the lens of Mādhyamaka philosophy, though the Yogacara- and Tathāgatagarbha-influenced interpretations are also influential. The interpretations of the Indian Mādhyamaka philosopher Candrakīrti are the dominant views on emptiness in Tibetan Buddhist philosophy.

In Tibet, a distinction also began to be made between the autonomist (svātantrika, rang rgyud pa) and consequentialist (prāsaṅgika, thal 'gyur pa) approaches to Mādhyamaka reasoning about emptiness. The distinction was invented by Tibetan scholarship, and not one made by classical Indian Madhyamikas.

Further Tibetan philosophical developments began in response to the works of the influential scholar Dolpopa (1292–1361) and led to two distinctly opposed Tibetan Mādhyamaka views on the nature of emptiness and ultimate reality.

One of these is the view termed shentong (Wylie: gzhan stong, 'other empty'), which is a further development of Indian Yogacara-Madhyamaka and the Buddha-nature teachings by Dolpopa, and is primarily promoted in the Jonang, Nyingma, and modern Kagyu schools. This view states that ultimate reality is empty of the conventional, but it is itself not empty of being ultimate Buddhahood and the luminous nature of mind. Dolpopa considered his view a form of Mādhyamaka, and called his system "Great Mādhyamaka". In Jonang, this ultimate reality is a "ground or substratum" which is "uncreated and indestructible, noncomposite and beyond the chain of dependent origination."

Dolpopa was roundly critiqued for his claims about emptiness and his view that they were a kind of Mādhyamaka. His critics include Tibetan philosophers such as the founder of the Gelug school Je Tsongkhapa (1357–1419) and Mikyö Dorje, the 8th Karmapa of the Karma Kagyu (1507–1554).

Rangtong (Wylie: rang stong; 'self-empty') refers to views which oppose shentong and state that ultimate reality is that which is empty of self-nature in a relative and absolute sense; that is to say ultimate reality is empty of everything, including itself. It is thus not a transcendental ground or metaphysical absolute, but just the absence of true existence (svabhava). This view has sometimes been applied to the Gelug school because they tend to hold that emptiness is "an absolute negation" (med dgag).

However, many Tibetan philosophers reject these terms as descriptions of their views on emptiness. The Sakya thinker Gorampa Sonam Senge (1429–1489), for example, called his version of Mādhyamaka, "freedom from extremes" or "freedom from proliferations" (spros bral) and claimed that the ultimate truth was ineffable, beyond predication or concept. For Gorampa, emptiness is not just the absence of inherent existence, but it is the absence of the four extremes in all phenomena i.e. existence, nonexistence, both and neither (see: catuskoti).

The 14th Dalai Lama, who generally speaks from the Gelug perspective, states:

According to the theory of emptiness, any belief in an objective reality grounded in the assumption of intrinsic, independent existence is simply untenable.
All things and events, whether 'material', mental or even abstract concepts like time, are devoid of objective, independent existence ... [T]hings and events are 'empty' in that they can never possess any immutable essence, intrinsic reality or absolute 'being' that affords independence.

=== Chinese Buddhism ===
==== Sānlùn school ====
When Buddhism was introduced in China it was initially understood in terms of indigenous Chinese philosophical culture. Because of this, emptiness (Ch., kong, 空;) was at first understood as pointing to a kind of transcendental reality similar to the Tao. It took several centuries to realize that śūnyatā does not refer to an essential transcendental reality underneath or behind the world of appearances.

Chinese Mādhyamaka (known as Sānlùn, or the "three treatise school") began with the work of Kumārajīva (344–413 CE) who translated the works of Nāgārjuna into Chinese. Sānlùn figures like Kumārajīva's pupil Sengzhao (384–414), and the later Jizang (549–623) were influential in introducing a more orthodox and non-essentialist interpretation of emptiness to Chinese Buddhism. Sengzhao argues, for example, that the nature of phenomena could not be said to be either existent or non-existent and that it was necessary to go beyond conceptual proliferation to realize emptiness. Jizang (549–623) was another central figure in Chinese Madhyamaka who wrote numerous commentaries on Nāgārjuna and Aryadeva and is considered to be the leading representative of the school. Jizang called his method "deconstructing what is misleading and revealing what is corrective". He insisted that one must never settle on any particular viewpoint or perspective but constantly reexamine one's formulations to avoid reifications of thought and behavior.

In the modern era, one major Chinese figure who has written on Mādhyamaka is the scholar monk Yin Shun (1906–2005).

==== Tiantai and Huayan ====
Later Chinese philosophers developed their own unique interpretations of emptiness. One of these was Zhiyi, the intellectual founder of the Tiantai school, who was strongly influenced by the Lotus sutra. The Tiantai view of emptiness and dependent origination is inseparable from their view of the "interfusion of phenomena" and the idea that the ultimate reality is an absolute totality of all particular things which are "Neither-Same-Nor-Different" from each other.

In Tiantai metaphysics, every event, function, or characteristic is the product of the interfusion of all others, the whole is in the particular and every particular event/function is also in every other particular. This also leads to the conclusion that all phenomena are "findable" in each and every other phenomena, even seemingly conflicting phenomena such as good and evil or delusion and enlightenment are interfused with each other.

The Huayan school understood emptiness and ultimate reality through the similar idea of interpenetration or "coalescence" (Wylie: zung-'jug; Sanskrit: yuganaddha), using the concept of Indra's net to illustrate this.

==== Chán ====
Chan Buddhism was influenced by all the previous Chinese Buddhist currents. The Mādhyamaka of Sengzhao, for example, influenced the views of the Chan patriarch Shen Hui (670–762), a critical figure in the development of Chan, as can be seen by his "Illuminating the Essential Doctrine" (Hsie Tsung Chi). This text emphasizes that true emptiness or Suchness cannot be known through thought since it is free from thought (wu-nien). Shen Hui also states that true emptiness is not nothing, but it is a "Subtle Existence" (miao-yu), which is just "Great Prajña."

The Chinese Chan presentation of emptiness, influenced by Yogacara and the Tathāgatagarbha sutras, also used more positive language and poetic metaphors to describe the nature of emptiness. For example, Hongzhi Zhengjue (1091–1157), a key figure in the Caodong lineage, wrote:

"The field of boundless emptiness is what exists from the very beginning. You must purify, cure, grind down, or brush away all the tendencies you have fabricated into apparent habits. [Those tendencies are the clouds in our eyes.] Then you can reside in a clear circle of brightness. Utter emptiness has no image. Upright independence does not rely on anything. Just expand and illuminate the original truth unconcerned by external conditions. Accordingly, we are told to realize that not a single thing exists. In this field birth and death do not appear. The deep source, transparent down to the bottom, can radiantly shine and can respond unencumbered to each speck of dust [each object] without becoming its partner. The subtlety of seeing and hearing transcends mere colors and sounds. The whole affair functions without leaving traces and mirrors without obscurations. Very naturally, mind and Dharmas emerge and harmonize."
"Vast and far-reaching without boundary, secluded and pure, manifesting light, this spirit is without obstruction. Its brightness does not shine out but can be called empty and inherently radiant. Its brightness, inherently purifying, transcends causal conditions beyond subject and object. Subtle but preserved, illumined and vast, also it cannot be spoken of as being or nonbeing, or discussed with images or calculations. Right in here the central pivot turns, the gateway opens. You accord and respond without laboring and accomplish without hindrance. Everywhere turn around freely, not following conditions, not falling into classifications. Facing everything, let go and attain stability. Stay with that just as that. Stay with this just as this. That and this are mixed together with no discriminations as to their places. So, it is said that the earth lifts up the mountain without knowing the mountain's stark steepness. A rock contains jade without knowing the jade's flawlessness. This is how truly to leave home, how home-leaving must be enacted."

=== Western Buddhism ===
Various western Buddhists note that Śūnyatā refers to the emptiness of inherent existence, as in Madhyamaka; but also to the emptiness of mind or awareness, as open space and the "ground of being," as in meditation-orientated traditions and approaches such as Dzogchen and Shentong.

== Hinduism ==
=== Influence on Advaita Vedanta ===
Gaudapada has developed his concept of "ajāta", which uses the term "anutpāda":

- "An" means "not", or "non"
- "Utpāda" means "genesis", "coming forth", "birth"

Taken together "anutpāda" means "having no origin", "not coming into existence", "not taking effect", "non-production".

According to Gaudapada, the Absolute is not subject to birth, change and death. The Absolute is aja, the unborn eternal. The empirical world of appearances is considered Maya (unreal as it is transitory), and not absolutely existent. Thus, Gaudapada's concept of ajativada is similar to Buddhist term "anutpāda" for the absence of an origin or śūnyatā. (Note: The term is also used in the Laṅkāvatāra Sūtra. According to D.T Suzuki, "anutpada" is not the opposite of "utpada", but transcends opposites. It is kenshō, seeing into the true nature of existence, the seeing that "all objects are without self-substance Śūnyatā".)

But Gaudapada's perspective is quite different from Nagarjuna's. Gaudapada's perspective found in Mandukya Karika is based on the Mandukya Upanishad. According to Gaudapada, the metaphysical absolute called Brahman never changes, while the phenomenal world changes continuously, so the phenomenal world cannot arise independently from Brahman. If the world cannot arise, yet is an empirical fact, then the perceived world has to be a transitory (unreal) appearance of Brahman. And if the phenomenal world is a transitory appearance, then there is no real origination or destruction, only apparent origination or destruction. From the level of ultimate truth (paramārthatā) the phenomenal world is māyā, "illusion", apparently existing but ultimately not metaphysically real.

In Gaudapada-Karika, chapter III, verses 46–48, he states that Brahman never arises, is never born, is never unborn, it rests in itself:

When the mind does not lie low, and is not again tossed about, then that being without movement, and not presenting any appearance, culminates into Brahman. Resting in itself, calm, with Nirvana, indescribable, highest happiness, unborn and one with the unborn knowable, omniscient they say. No creature whatever is born, no origination of it exists or takes place. This is that highest truth where nothing whatever is born.

— Gaudapada Karika, 3.46-48, Translated by RD Karmarkar

In contrast to Renard's view, Karmarkar states the Ajativada of Gaudapada has nothing in common with the Śūnyatā concept in Buddhism. While the language of Gaudapada is undeniably similar to those found in Mahayana Buddhism, states Comans, their perspective is different because unlike Buddhism, Gaudapada is relying on the premise of "Brahman, Atman or Turiya" exist and are the nature of absolute reality.

=== In Shaivism ===
Sunya and sunyatisunya are concepts which appear in some Shaiva texts, such as the Vijñāna Bhairava Tantra, which contains several verses mentioning voidness as a feature of ultimate reality - Shiva:

The Absolute void is Bhairava who is beyond the senses and the mind, beyond all the categories of these instruments. From the point of view of the human mind, He is most void. from the point of view of Reality, He is most full, for He is the source of all manifestation.

The yogi should concentrate intensely on the idea (and also feel) that this universe is totally void. In that void, his mind would become absorbed. Then he becomes highly qualified for absorption i.e. his mind is absorbed in the absolute void (sunyatisunya).

In a series of Kannada language texts of Lingayatism, a Shaivism tradition, shunya is equated to the concept of the supreme. In particular, the Shunya Sampadane texts present the ideas of Allama Prabhu in a form of dialogue, where shunya is that void and distinctions which a spiritual journey seeks to fill and eliminate. It is the described as a state of union of one's soul with the infinite Shiva, the state of blissful moksha.

=== In Vaishnavism ===
Shunya Brahma is a concept found in certain texts of Vaishnavism, particularly in Odiya, such as the poetic Panchasakhas. It explains the Nirguna Brahman idea of Vedanta, that is the eternal unchanging metaphysical reality as "personified void". Alternative names for this concept of Hinduism, include shunya purusha and Jagannatha (Vishnu) in certain text. However, both in Lingayatism and various flavors of Vaishnavism such as Mahima Dharma, the idea of Shunya is closer to the Hindu concept of metaphysical Brahman, rather than to the Śūnyatā concept of Buddhism. However, there is some overlap, such as in the works of Bhima Bhoi.

In the Vaishnavism of Orissa, the idea of shunya brahman or shunya purusha is found in the poetry of the Orissan Panchasakhas (Five Friends), such as in the compositions of 16th-century Acyutananda. Acyutananda's Shunya Samhita extols the nature of shunya brahman:

nāhi tāhāra rūpa varṇa, adṛsha avarṇa tā cinha.
tāhāku brahmā boli kahi, śūnya brahmhati se bolāi.

It has no shape, no colour,
It is invisible and without a name
This Brahman is called Shunya Brahman.

The Panchasakhas practiced a form of Bhakti called Jnana-mishrita Bhakti-marga, which saw the necessity of knowledge (Jnana) and devotion - Bhakti.

=== In Shaktism ===
Mahāśūnya (महाशून्य) refers to the "great void", according to Arṇasiṃha's Mahānayaprakāśa verse 134.—Accordingly, "The Śāmbhava (state) is the one in which the power of consciousness (citi) suddenly (sahasā) dissolves away into the Great Void [i.e., mahāśūnya] called the Inactive (niḥspanda) that is profound and has no abode. Cognitive awareness (jñāna) arises here in the form of a subtle wave of consciousness out of that ocean of emptiness, which is the perfectly peaceful condition of the dissolving away of destruction. [...] Again, that same (principle) free of the cognitive process (saṃvittikalanā) is the supreme absolute (niruttara) said to be the Śāmbhava state of emptiness (vyomaśāmbhava)".

== Alternative translations ==
- Interdependence (Ringu Tulku)
- Thusness

== See also ==
- 0
- A in Buddhism
- Acosmism
- Anattā
- Anicca
- Anutpāda
- Apophatic theology
- Buddha-nature
- Buddhist philosophy
- Chaos (cosmogony)
- Depersonalization
- Derealization
- Determinism
- Dharmadhatu
- Dharmakāya
- Ego death
- Existentialism
- Fana (Sufism)
- Kenosis
- Maya (illusion)
- Mu (negative)
- Nihilism
- Performative contradiction
- Pratītyasamutpāda
- Structuralism (philosophy of science)
- Ta'til
- Tathātā
