= Swami Vivekananda University =

Swami Vivekananda University may refer to these universities in India named after the monk Swami Vivekananda:

- Chhattisgarh Swami Vivekanand Technical University, a university in Chhattisgarh, India
- Ramakrishna Mission Vivekananda Educational and Research Institute, a university located in Belur, West Bengal
- Swami Vivekananda University, Barrackpore, a private University located in Barrackpore, West Bengal
- Swami Vivekanand University, Sagar, a university located in Madhya Pradesh, India
- Swami Vivekanand Subharti University, a university located in Uttar Pradesh, India
- Swami Vivekananda Yoga Anusandhana Samsthana, a university located in Karnataka, India
- Vivekananda Global University, a university in Rajasthan, India
- Swami Vivekanand University, Kokrajhar, a private University located in Kokrajhar, Assam

== See also ==
- Swami Vivekananda (disambiguation)
- Vivekananda College (disambiguation)
