= Ramakrishna Mission Ashrama, Narendrapur =

Ramakrishna Mission Ashrama, Narendrapur may refer to these educational institutes run by the Ramakrishna Mission in Narendrapur, Kolkata, India:

- Ramakrishna Mission Vidyalaya, Narendrapur, a school
- Ramakrishna Mission Residential College, Narendrapur, a residential college

== See also ==
- Ramakrishna (disambiguation)
- Ramakrishna Mission Vidyalaya (disambiguation)
