= Ramakrishna Mission Vidyalaya =

Ramakrishna Mission Vidyalaya may refer to these schools in India run by the Ramakrishna Mission:

- Ramakrishna Mission Vidyalaya, Coimbatore, Tamil Nadu
- Ramakrishna Mission Vidyalaya, Narendrapur, Kolkata
- Ramakrishna Mission Vidyalaya, Viveknagar, Agartala, Tripura
- Ramakrishna Mission School, Sidhgora Jamshedpur, Jharkhand
- Sargachi Ramakrishna Mission High School, West Bengal

== See also ==
- Ramakrishna (disambiguation)
- Ramakrishna Mission Vidyapith (disambiguation)
- Vivekananda College (disambiguation)
- Ramakrishna Mission Ashrama, Narendrapur (disambiguation)
- Ramakrishna Mission Vidyabhaban, Midnapore, school in Midnapore, West Bengal, India
- Ramakrishna Mission Vidyamandira, college in West Bengal, India
