= Swami Vivekananda Road =

Swami Vivekananda Road may refer to these roads in India named after the monk Swami Vivekananda:

- Swami Vivekanand Road (Mumbai)
- Swami Vivekanand Road (Bangalore), in Bangalore
  - Swami Vivekananda Road metro station
- Vivekananda Road, Kolkata

== See also ==
- Swami Vivekananda (disambiguation)
