= A in Buddhism =

Letter A in Siddham script

The phoneme A (Nagari: अ, Siddham: 𑖀) is an important symbol and seed mantra in Mahayana Buddhism as well as in Vajrayana Buddhism.

== In Mahayana ==
A is the first vowel of the Sanskrit alphabet. Mahayana Buddhism invested the phoneme with mystical significance, associated with the doctrine of emptiness. In Sanskrit, when a is used as a prefix, it negates the meaning of a word. Thus, for example, svabhāva, “with essence,” can be changed to asvabhāva, “without essence.”

The letter also came to signify the Mahayana teaching of Prajñāpāramitā (the Perfection of Wisdom). One of the Prajñāpāramitā sutras is the short The Perfection of Wisdom Mother in One Syllable (ekākṣarīmātāprajñāpāramitā). The sutra opens and closes like a regular Prajñāpāramitā sutra (with a typical introductory nidana), but the actual teaching of the sutra is one syllable: A. According to this sutra, all Prajñāpāramitā teachings are contained in "A".

The Pañcaviṃśatisāhasrikā Prajñāpāramita Sutra (The Perfection of Wisdom in 25,000 lines) contains a method for meditating on the letters of the Arapacana alphabet (an alphabet associated with Karosthi) as part of a practice which is termed "entrance into the door of the dhāraṇīs, the entrance into the exposition of the letters". Beginning with the letter A, the sutra states that this letter signifies "anutpāda", "non-arising" or "not-born." Specifically, the sutra states that A "is a door to the insight that all dharmas are unproduced from the very beginning (akāro mukhaḥ sarvadharmāṇāṃ ādyanutpannavāt)."

This statement later became its own mantra, which is found in the Hevajra Tantra (10th century). Anutpāda is an important term in Mahayana Buddhism which is associated with the ultimate truth and with emptiness. The Pañcaviṃśatisāhasrikā Prajñāpāramita goes on to state that "any Bodhisattva who cognizes this skill in letters A, etc, will not be tied down by any sounds, he will accomplish everything through the sameness of all dharmas, and he will acquire the skill in the cognition of sounds." The sameness of dharmas refers to how all phenomena are equally empty and without essence (svabhava).

According to Edward Conze this idea may be related to Mahasamghika school doctrine which held that the Buddha taught by emitting just one single sound which is heard in many different ways by different hearers (according to their needs).

अ also appears in the Tathāgataguhyaka Sūtra, in which it appears as a dhāraṇī called “the Dhāraṇī Door of the Entry into the Characteristics of Dharmas.”

In East Asian Buddhist traditions of Chan/Zen, the letter A is also sometimes seen as symbolizing Buddha nature. In the Rinzai school, A is sometimes used as part of certain meditative techniques.

== In Vajrayana ==
A white Tibetan letter A inside a rainbow thigle is a common symbol of Dzogchen

The letter A appears as a seed (bīja) syllable mantra in the Vairocanābhisaṃbodhi Sutra which states:

The letter A is the essence of all mantras, and from it there issue forth everywhere immeasurable mantras;

All frivolous arguments cease, and it is able to produce skillful wisdom.

Lord of Mysteries, why is [the letter A] the essence of all mantras?

The Buddha, honored among two-legged beings, has taught that the letter A is called the seed.

Therefore, everything is like this, [having the letter A as its seed,] and it rests in all the limbs;

Having allocated it as appropriate, bestow it everywhere in accordance with the rules.

Because that primordial letter (i.e., A) pervades the augmented letters,

The letters form sounds, and the limbs arise from this.

In the esoteric Shingon school, the letter A is considered to be the seed syllable or bijamantra of Mahavairocana and represents the Dharmakaya, and ultimate reality. It used in a unique and popular form of meditation called Ajikan (“contemplation of the letter ‘a’”). In this meditation, the meditator visualizes a Siddham A in a moon disk, which symbolizes the unborn (anutpada) Buddha nature in all beings as well as the Buddha Vairocana. This teaching and practice is one of the most fundamental elements of the Shingon system taught by the Japanese tantric master Kūkai (774-835).

In the Dzogchen traditions of Nyingma and Bon, the seed syllable A is widely used symbolically and as a mantric syllable in various meditations (such as in the Dzogchen semdzins, "fixing the mind" and guru yoga practice). In Dzogchen, the letter A typically signifies the primordial state or basis (gzhi).

== See also ==
- A-un
