= Vivekananda College =

Vivekananda College may refer to one of several education institutes in India named after the monk Swami Vivekananda:

- Vivekananda College, Alipurduar, Alipurduar, West Bengal, India
- Vivekananda College, Delhi, a college of University of Delhi
- Vivekananda College, Madhyamgram, Madhyamgram, West Bengal, India
- Vivekananda College, Madurai, Thiruvedagam, Madurai, Tamil Nadu, India
- Vivekananda College, Thakurpukur, Thakurpukur, Kolkata, West Bengal, India
- Vivekananda College for Women, Barisha, West Bengal, India
- Vivekananda Degree College, Kukatpally, Kukatpally, Telangana, India
- Ramakrishna Mission Vivekananda College, Chennai, Tamil Nadu, India, run by the Ramakrishna Mission
- Ramakrishna Mission Vivekananda Centenary College, Rahara, West Bengal, India, run by the Ramakrishna Mission
- Ramakrishna Mission Residential College, Narendrapur, Narendrapur, Kolkata, West Bengal, India, run by the Ramakrishna Mission
- Vivekananda Mahavidyalaya, Burdwan, West Bengal, India
- Sri Ram Dayal Khemka Vivekananda Vidyalaya Junior College, Thiruvottiyur, north Chennai, Tamil Nadu, India

== See also ==
- Swami Vivekananda (disambiguation)
- Swami Vivekananda University (disambiguation)
- Ramakrishna Mission Vidyalaya (disambiguation)
- Orr's Hill Vivekananda College, Trincomalee, Sri Lanka
