= Vivekanandan =

Vivekanandan is an Indian name that is mostly used in South India (mainly, Kerala and Tamil Nadu) as a variant of the name Vivekananda. The name originates from two Sanskrit-based words Vivekam meaning wisdom or knowledge and Anandam meaning joy; therefore, the name Vivekanandan denotes a person who finds joy in wisdom or knowledge.

== People ==
- Swami Vivekananda, Indian Hindu monk of the 19th century who introduced the Indian philosophies of Vedanta and Yoga to the Western world
- Vivek (actor), South Indian film actor and comedian of the Tamil film industry
- V. K. Sasikala, South Indian politician and business person

== Other uses ==
- Vivekanandan version, a modern version of Akilam, the main religious text of the Tamil belief system Ayyavazhi

== See also ==
- Swami Vivekananda (disambiguation)
- Vivek (disambiguation)
