= Swami Vivekananda (disambiguation) =

Swami Vivekananda (1863-1902) was an Indian Hindu monk and a chief disciple of Ramakrishna.

Swami Vivekananda or Vivekanda may also refer to these, related to the monk, in India:

- Swami Vivekananda (1955 film)
- Swami Vivekananda (1998 film)
- Swami Vivekananda Airport, Chhattisgarh
- Swami Vivekananda Bridge or Ellis Bridge, Ahmedabad
- Swami Vivekanand Road (Mumbai)
- Swami Vivekananda Road metro station, Bangalore
- Vivekananda Setu, a bridge over the Hooghly River in West Bengal, India

== See also ==
- Vivekanandan (disambiguation)
- Vivekananda College (disambiguation)
- Swami Vivekananda University (disambiguation)
- Swami Vivekananda Road (disambiguation)
- Vivek (disambiguation)
