= Olympe Ramakrishna =

Franco-Indian visual artist

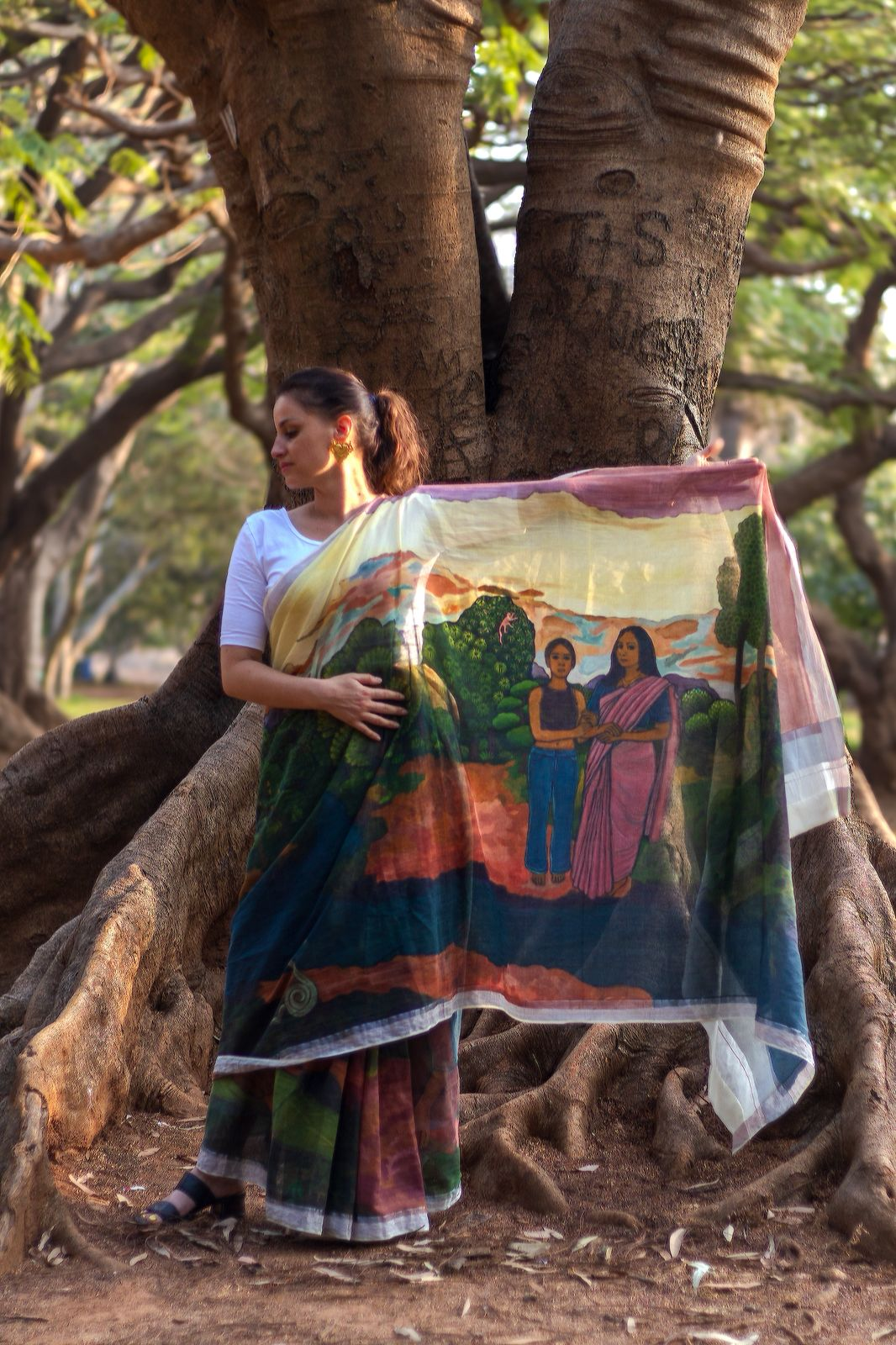
- in 2026
- Born: 2 February 1986 (age 40); Lisieux, France
- Occupation: Visual artist
- Website: www.olymperamakrishna.com

Olympe Thomas-Lamotte Ramakrishna (born 2 February 1986) is a visual artist based between Normandy, France, and Bangalore, India. Her work focuses on representations of femininity, combining painting, textile art, and embroidery, and drawing on both European and Indian artistic traditions. Her practice includes a focus on the role of women in history.

== Early life and education ==
Olympe Thomas-Lamotte Ramakrishna was born on 2 February 1986 in Lisieux, Normandy. She trained in life drawing and anatomy at the École des Beaux-Arts de Paris, the Académie de la Grande Chaumière, and the Atelier Artmedium, and later continued her artistic practice in London at the Battersea Arts Centre.

== Artistic practice ==
Ramakrishna's artistic influences range from the Flemish Primitives, Ingres, Gauguin, Pierre-Joseph Redoute, as well as Mughal paintings, Company paintings, Raja Ravi Varma and Amrita Sher Gil.

Many of her exhibited pieces have been portraits of Indian contemporary women, such as her 2023 installation, Women of Bangalore (or Women of Urban India).

Her work is often described as symbolic, particularly through her use of the sari and visual references that blend European and Indian traditions. She also explores the fluidity, transparency and movement of textile materials. Combining these interests, Ramakrishna transforms her oil paintings into large-scale textile works through digital printing on silk or cotton saris, such as her 2026 piece Voices of the Western Coast representing Kerala women and their generational cultural evolution.

== Exhibitions ==
Her work has been presented in multiple exhibitions across India, including within the Alliance Française network, notably in Delhi, Bangalore, Thiruvananthapuram, Chandigarh, Ahmedabad, Hyderabad, Pune.

It was also shown in France at the Church of Vieux Saint-Sauveur de Caen, and at the Château de Fontaine-Henry, in Normandy, during an exhibition dedicated to Matilda of Flanders.
