= Dṛg-Dṛśya-Viveka =

Advaita Vedanta text

The Dṛg-Dṛśya-Viveka or Vâkyasudhâ is an Advaita Vedanta text attributed to Bhāratī Tīrtha or Vidyaranya Swami (c. 1350)

== Authorship ==
Although also attributed to Adi Shankara, (Note: arshabodha.org, Drig Drishya Viveka) the text is most commonly attributed to Bharatī Tīrtha (c. 1350). It is also known as Vakya Suddha, which is attributed to Adi Shankara.

== Contents ==
The Dṛg-Dṛśya-Viveka contains 46 slokas performing an inquiry into the distinction between the "seer" (Dṛg) and the "seen" (Dṛśya), an overview of samadhi, centering on savikalpa and nirvikalpa, and the identity of Atman and Brahman.

== Commentaries ==
There are many translations and commentaries in English for Dṛg Dṛśya Viveka and one of the most notable is of "Dravidācārya" Śrī Rāmakṛṣṇan Svāmīji.

== See also ==
- Self-enquiry
- Ajativada
- Viveka
- Sakshi (Witness)

== Sources ==
Printed sources

- Deshmukh, Dr. Shrikrishna. The Essence of Drk-Drsya Viveka::Distinguishing the 'Perceiver' from the 'Perceived'. Motilal Banarsidass. ISBN 978-8120842175.
- Nikhalananda, Swami (1931), Drg-Drsya-Viveka. An inquiry into the nature of the 'seer' and the 'seen.', Sri Ramakrishna Asrama
- Witz, Klaus G. (1998), The Supreme Wisdom of the Upaniṣads: An Introduction, Motilall Banarsidas

Web-sources
