= Vaduvur Srinivasa Desikachariar =

Vaduvur Veeravalli Srinivasa Desikachariar
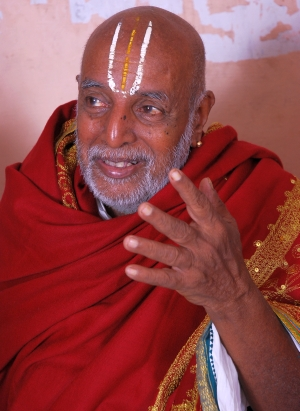
- Vaduvur (Vaduvoor) Srinivasa Desikachariar in 2011

Personal life
- Born: 4 November 1928 Vaduvur, Tamil Nadu, India
- Died: 9 September 2014 (aged 85) Vaduvur, Tamil Nadu, India
- Notable work(s): Pithru Medah Saaram – a text book on Dharma Saastraa, Purva Apara Prayogam – a text book on Vedic Rituals
- Honors: Salakshana Ganapaadi (PhD in Veda Adhyayanam) & Veda Baashya Mani (D.Sc in Vedic Studies)

Religious life
- Religion: Hinduism
- Philosophy: Vedas

Religious career
- Teacher: Srimad Andavan-6th & 7th Peetathipathis – Srimad Therazhundur Andavan performed Saranagathi & Srimad Akkur Andavan performed Samasrayanam

Vaduvur Veeravalli Srinivasa Desikachariar (4 November 1928 — 9 September 2014) was an Indian scholar. He studied Sanskrit and published several books. In 2001, he received the Rashtrapati Award from the President of India as a Sanskrit scholar, one of the highest awards awarded by the Indian state.

== Life and contribution ==
Vaduvur (Vaduvoor) Veeravalli Sri Srinivasa Desikachariar Swami was born in Vaduvur, India on 4 November 1928 (Vibhava Varusham Aippasi Maasam Pushya Nakshatram), to Srimathi Kanakavalli and Sri Veeraraghavachariar.

Five generations of his ancestors were trained in Veda Adhyayis and were rendering service to Srimad Andavan Ashramam without compensation.

His uncle (Chitappa), Ganapadi Sri Narasimhachariar, was one of the great Veda teachers of those days, teaching in the famous Veda Patasala in Mannargudi founded by Sri Anna Swami Iyengar (continued by his son, A. Srinivasa Iyengar Swami). He introduced the weekly tests in Veda Patasalas in Tamil Nadu modelled after the Kerala pattern. His father died when he was 12. As a child, Desikachariar was enrolled by his uncle in that Patasala and started training in Divya Prabandham from Kanthadai Ramanujachariar Swami and was later trained in Veda Adhyayanam by his uncle. He completed Veda Adhyayanam (up to Kramantham) in seven years and completed the Ganantham and then Salakshanam (equivalent to PhD) in just one more year. He was examined at the Sankara Mutt and cleared these in First Distinction.

As Yajamana Bhakti, when Sri Desikachariar was honoured with the President Award in 2001, he went straight to Mannargudi and sought the blessings of A Srinivasa Iyengar Swami, his well wisher and founder of Mannargudi Veda Pata Sala and then later visited his own house in Vaduvur.

== Prapathi/Saranagathi ==
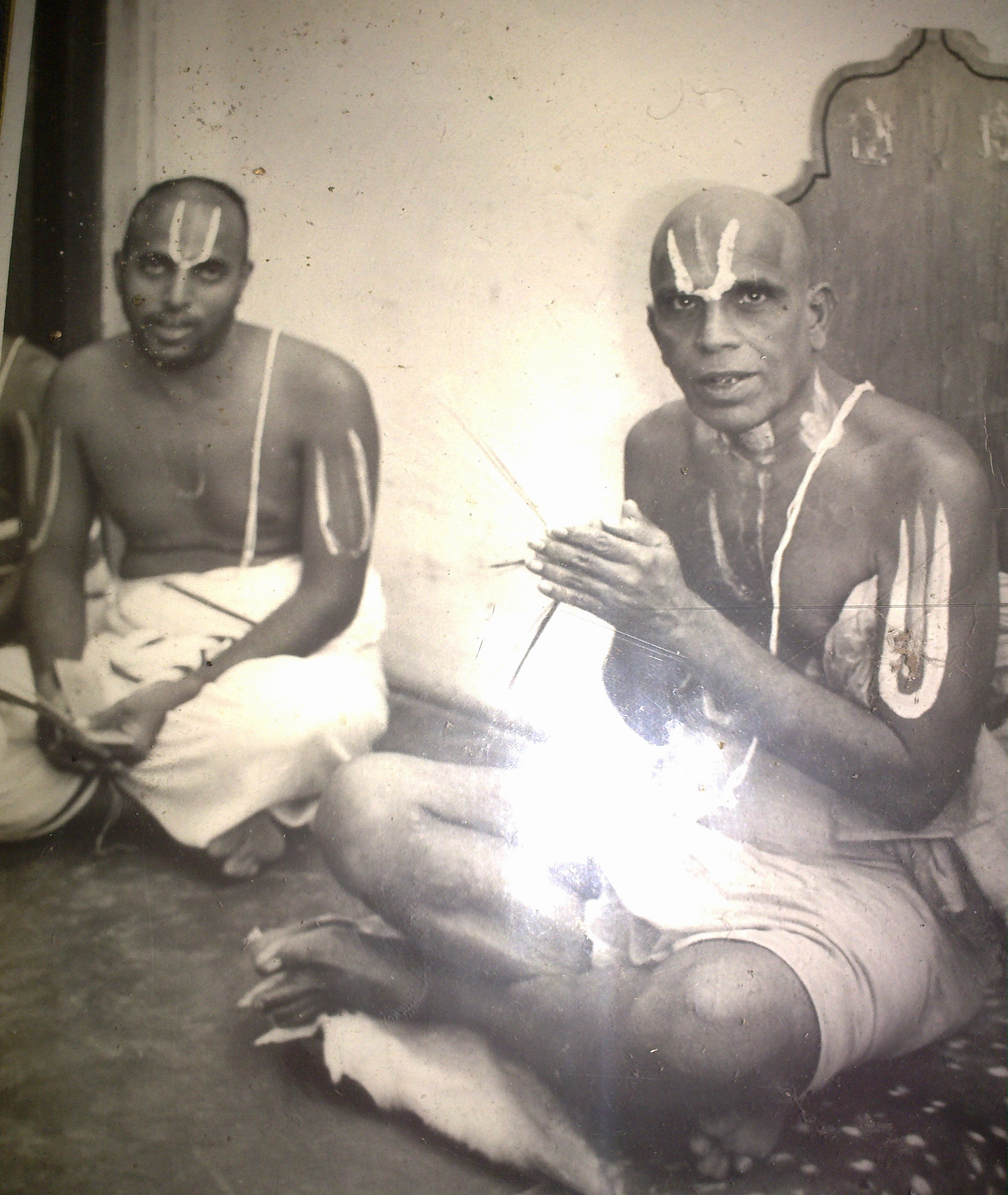
Srimad Andavan Swami and Vaduvur Desikachariar

Sri Desikachariar had his Prapatthi performed at a very young age by Srimad Therazhundur Andavan Swami and Samasrayanam under Akkur Andavan Swami. Thus he, along with Sri Thenbirai Lakshmi Raghavachariar, was one of the few sishyas with links to six Acharya Sreshtas of the Andavan Parampara.

== Relationship with Sri Kanchi Paramacharya ==
While Sri Desikachariar was 13 years old and having training in Prabandha Adyayenam, Kanchi Paramacharya Sri Chandrashekarendra Saraswati Swami was visiting Mannargudi. The great Sage had tremendous respect for the Mannargudi family. Srinivasa Iyengar introduced the young scholar to Paramacharya, who asked the boy to recite the "Koondhal malar mangaikkum man madanthaikkum". Young Sri Desikachariar recited this Pasuram in a resounding manner and was blessed by the Paramacharya.

Later, Sri Desikachariar's Ganantham Pariksha was conducted by none other than Late Kanchi Paramacharya himself.

Impressed by the then young Yajur Veda Ganapadi, Paramacharya appointed him as a Parikshaadhikari (examiner) for the Vedic Exams conducted by Sankara Mutt Patasalas and the swami performed this task for nearly 55 years before others did that job.

Kanchi Paramacharya Sri Chandrashekarendra Saraswati Swami continued to be his Guide and Philosopher for more than 50 years.

During the time, Sri Kanchi Paramacharya desired that Sri Desikachariar should publish some authoritative works on Dharma Saastra. Desikachariar located the Telugu edition of "Pithru Medha Saram" originally done by Vaideeka Sarvabhouma Thozhappar, and translated to Devanagari with all Pramanams and a Tamizh vyakyanam.

== Awards and recognition ==
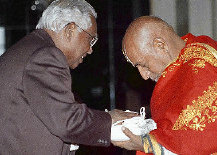
Receiving President award from President of India K.R Narayanan

In 2001, Sri Desikachariar was honoured with the Rashtrapati Award by the President of India as a Sanskrit Scholar, one of the highest awards given by the Indian State by President K.R. Narayanan.

In addition, he was

1. The Chief Examiner of Vedic knowledge at Srirangam Srimad Andavan Ashramam, Ahobila Mutt, Parakala Mutt, Mysore; Sri Kanchi Mutt; Tirumala Tirupati Devasthanams; Uttaradhi Mutt, Mysore.

Additionally,

1. HH Srimad (Srimushnam) Andavan appointed him as the Srikaryam of Srirangam Srimad Andavan Asramam in October 2007
2. He has authored the magnum opus " Pithru Medah Saaram " – a text book on Dharma Saastraa
3. He has officiated as the Brihaspathi in nearly 44 Chatur Maasya Sanakalpams by three Yathis of the Andavan Ashramam without break from 1963 to 2006
4. Involved and recognised by many more mutts and organisations
5. He was the direct charge of Vaduvur (Vaduvoor) Veda Patasala

He also officiated Brihaspathi when Five Acharyas took to Holy Orders (ThuriAsramam or Sanyasaasramam)

1. Srimad Thirukkudanthai Andavan,
2. Srimad Mysore Andavan,
3. the 45th Jeer of Sri Ahobila Mutt,
4. the 46th Jeer of Sri Ahobila Mutt and
5. Prakrutham Srimad Srimushnam Andavan

Chief priest for Aswameda Yajna Ratri Homa conducted in Hyderabad in 1985. Performed Homas as prescribed by scriptures

== Academic Qualification ==
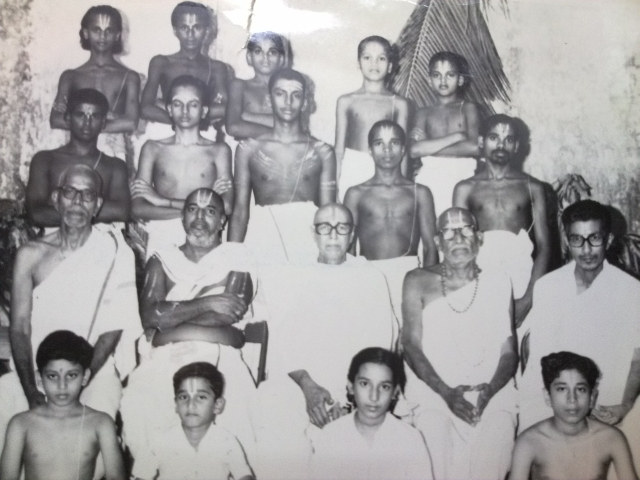
Old Photo of Desikachariar with other teachers and main disciples

Salaksha Ganapadi in Krishna Yajur Vedam Passed Veda Bashya conducted by Sri Kanchi Kamakoti Peetam, Kanchipuram Passed Drhyaganam conducted by Sri Veda Dharma Sastra Paripalana Sabha, Kumbakonam

Passed

1. Apastamba
2. Bodhyana
3. Aswalayana
4. Drahyayana Sutras with Purva and Apara Prayoga at Mysore
5. Mastered Nalayira Divya Prapandam
6. Special study of Purva and Uttara Mimamsa Sastras

Specialization Sribashya of Srimad Ramanuja and Sri Vedanta Desikar's works under the holiness of Srimad Andavan of Srirangam Periyashramam

A Rare Combination A rare combination of Salakshana Veda Ghana Pata along with the commentaries (Veda Bashya), the application of ritualistic rites that are laid down in the Srauta Sutras and Grhya Sutras, the mastery of Purva Mimansa Sastra and the command over the Vedanta Sastra

== Languages / Scripts / Lipis known ==
Languages- Sanskrit, Tamil, Telugu, Hindi Scripts/Lipis- Devanagiri, Granta, Tamil, Telugu

== Literary Research and scholarly works ==
1. Written commentary on "Pitrumedha Sara Prasna" and "Sudhi Vilochanam", published for the first time with special annotation from Vedas and Sanskrit Quotations containing 500 pages
2. A Book on "Purva and Apara Prayoga" that was published in 1996
3. An authority on "Apastamba Grhya Sutras and Pancharatra Agama Sastras"

Have made detailed comparative study of different "Srauta" and "Grhya Sutras" such as

1. Apastamba
2. Bodhyana
3. Aashvalayanam
4. Drakshyayana

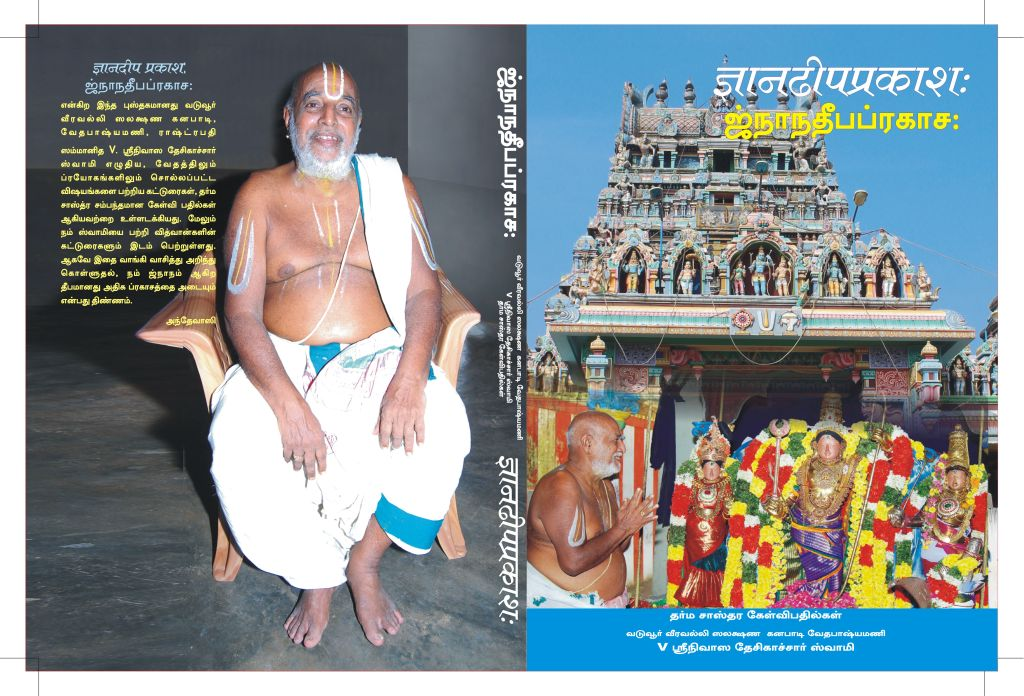
Book on Vedic Dharma Sastra

"GNANA DEEPAPRAKASHAHA" (in Tamil only) - A new 230+ page book on our Dharmaśāstra, based based on our swami's various articles and question & answers, in Sri Ranganatha Paduka magazine (Srimad Andavan ashram publications) and other publications for many many years

When such an idea for put forth to Srimad Andavan Sri Rangaramanuja Mahadesikan, the acharya not only blessed the initiative, but also provided his blessings on the contents of the book. Similarly 46th Jeeyar of Ahobila Mutt, Srimad Paundaripuram Ashramam Sri Raghuveera Mahadesikan swami and Sri Kanchi Kamakoti Peetam had given their blessings and introduction in the book.

The book was officially launched on Apr 3, 2016 in Mannurgudi during 71st Vidwat Sathas by Judge Ramasubramanyam, in the presence of

1. Sri Tirupati Ganapati Srinivasan - President of India Awardee for Vedic Contribution and sishya of Sri Vaduvur Desikachariar
2. Sri Mani Dravid - President of India Awardee for Vedic Contribution
3. Sri Krishnamoorthy Sastrigal - President of India Awardee for Vedic Contribution
4. Sri Velukudi Krishnan
5. Sri Villur Karunakarachariar
6. Sri Narasimhachariar (Ahobila Mutt Aradhagar),
7. Madhwa Vidwan Sri Krishnachar

== Back to Vaduvur/Vaduvoor ==
After teaching in Mannargudi Veda Pata Sala for over 50 years, Sri Desikachariar returned to Vaduvur in 1996 to start Vaduvur Veda Pata Sala and many batches of students have passed out of Pata Sala and currently in Vaidhigam and Vedic services all across India and abroad.

Under Sri Desikachariar's guidance, many philanthropic work has been carried forward in the form of Village Improvement and Vaduvur Temple renovation and festival celebrations.

== 80th birthday (Sathabishekam ) ==
Disciples and well-wishers organised the Sathabishekam (80th Birthday celebration) at Vaduvur on 22 October 2008.

He had a tremendous love for Divya Prabandham. Hence during his 80th Birthday, Divya Prabandha Parayanam was included as an addition. His old friends from school days in Vaduvur School attended the event, including Munuswamy Pillai, Maniam (Vaduvur Mel pathi) and Murugesan (Retd PWD).

The whole village was in festival mood during this time amidst large gathering of local people across the region. Over 1000 disciples/shishyas across India, representatives from 5 different Mutts and prasadams from 60 different temples were offered in this occasion

== Kainkaryam to Vaduvur and Mannargudi Temple ==
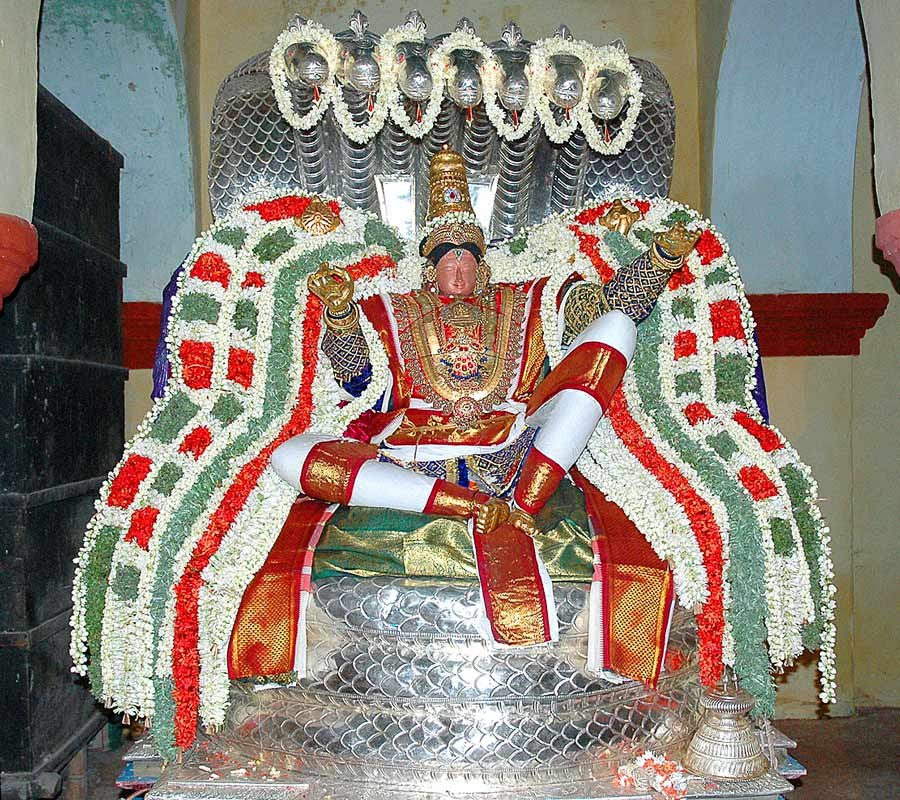
Vaduvur Sesha Vaganam

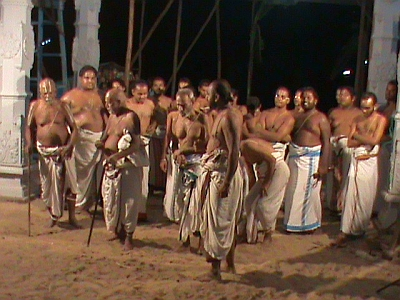
Veda Parayanam during Utsavam

Under Sri Desikachariar's guidance and support of his students including Ganapadi N.Govindarajan and others, many philanthropic work has been carried forward.

- Renovation of Vaduvur Temple
- Maha Samprokshanam of Vaduvur (Vaduvoor) Temple in 1996 and in 2007
- Every year Sri Ramanavami Utsavam and Theppotsavam (Tank Festival) has been celebrated with 3rd day Sesha Vahanam (Serpant) is directly undertaken by him. Over 100 students across various part of country come for each occasion and celebrate it as their own function.
- Silver Sesha Vaganam for Vaduvur Ramar and Mannargudi Sengamala Thayar (Mannargudi Rajagopalan Temple)·
- Samarpanam of Swarna Yagnopavitham (Sacred Thread or Poonal) for Vaduvur Ramar.
- Renovation of Sri Kailasanathar Temple in Vaduvur and conducted the kumbabishekam
- Golden Plating of Sri Ramar's Bow (Dhanush/Kothandam)
- Golden Crown (Kreedam) for Seetha Pirati
- Gold dipped kavacham for Srirama, Sita, Lakshmanar and Hanumar
- Samarpanam of Gold dipped Umbrella (Swarna Chatram)
- Recently, to build Vaduvur Sport Academy, under his guidance, Sarvabhowmam Ramaswamy Iyengar family had donated a huge ground worth 1.5 million as of today
- In addition, our Swami along with Madapusi Puranam Vaduvur Ahobila Mutt Mudra Kartha Sri Sadagopachariar have never missed any major events at the temple without conducting Veda Parayanam with his students for last 60+ years

Swami, attained Acharyan Thiruvadi, on 9 September 2014.
