= Matha =

Hindu monastery

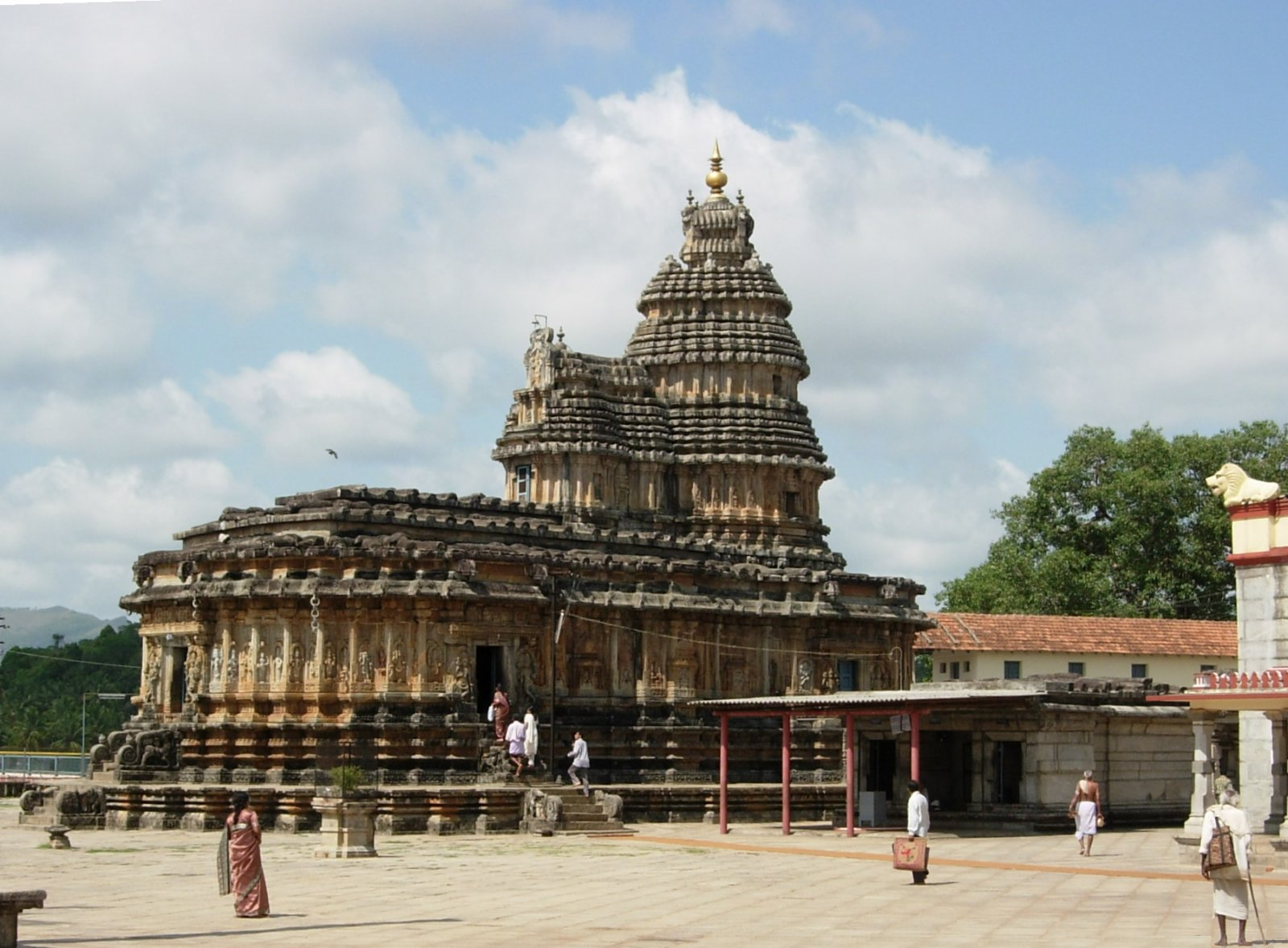
An Advaita Vedanta monastery and Vidyashankara temple at Sringeri Sharada Peetham, Sringeri, Karnataka.

A matha (/mʌt/; Sanskrit: मठ, maṭha), also written as math, muth, mutth, mutt, or mut, is a Sanskrit word that means 'institute or college', and it also refers to a monastery in Hinduism. An alternative term for such a monastery is adheenam (also transliterated ādīnam, adinam, aadheenam, aadheenm, etc.). The earliest epigraphical evidence for mathas related to Hindu-temples comes from the 7th to 10th century CE.

The most famous Advaita Vedanta mathas or peethams, which came to be affiliated with the Advaita tradition in the 14th century, are Govardhanmaṭha Pīṭhaṃ at Puri, Odisha; Śārada Pīṭhaṃ at Sringeri, Karnataka; Kalika Pīṭhaṃ at Dvāraka, Gujarat; Jyotirmaṭha Pīṭhaṃ at Badari, Uttarakhand; and Sri Kanchi Kamakoti Peetham at Kanchi, Tamil Nadu.

The most famous and influential Dvaita Vedanta mathas or peethams are Ashta Mathas at Udupi, Karnataka; Uttaradi Matha at Bangalore, Karnataka; Vyasaraja Matha at Sosale, Karnataka; and Raghavendra Matha at Mantralayam, Andhra Pradesh.

Famous mathas or peethams professing the Vishishtadvaita philosophy include Parakala Matha at Mysore, Karnataka; Ahobila Matha at Ahobilam, Andhra Pradesh; and Srimad Andavan Ashramam at Srirangam, Tamil Nadu.

Other major and influential mathas belong to various schools of Hindu philosophy, such as those of Vaishnavism and Shaivism. The monastery host and feed students, sannyasis (monks, renouncers, ascetics), gurus and are led by acharyas. These monasteries are sometimes attached to Hindu temples and have their codes of conduct, initiation and election ceremonies. The mathas in the Hindu tradition have not been limited to religious studies, and historical evidence suggests that they were centers for diverse studies such as medieval medicine, grammar and music.

The term matha is also used for 'monastery' in Jainism, and the earliest monasteries near Jain temples are dated to be from about the 5th-century CE.

== Etymology ==
Matha (Sanskrit: मठ) refers to 'cloister, institute, or college', and in some contexts refers to 'hut of an ascetic, monk or renunciate' or 'temple for studies'. The root of the word is math, which means 'inhabit' or 'to grind'. The oldest meaning of matha is "hut" or "hovel," "the hut of a nomadic arya." In time, it came to mean "the residence of various ascetics or religious scholars, sometimes attached to a grand temple."

== History ==
Patrick Olivelle mentions the absence of organized ascetic or monastic institutions within Brahmanism until the early medieval period. According to Olivelle, noticing the Advaita leaning of the Sannyasa Upanishads, the major monasteries of the early mediaeval period belonged to the Advaita Vedanta tradition, preserving and possibly adapting the Sannyasa Upanishads with their Advaita leaning.

Mathas, as simple huts for wandering ascetics, are mentioned in chapter 12.139 of the Mahabharata and section 3.1 of Baudhayana Dharmasutras. Matha-s were regionally known by other terms, such as Ghatika-s and Khandika-s. The oldest verifiable Ghatika for Vedic studies, from inscription evidence is in Kanchi, from the 4th-century CE.

=== Historical roles of matha ===
Kanchi inscription suggests the existence of a Vedic-Agamic matha in the 4th century CE. Then it was known as a Ghatika.

The matha tradition of Hinduism attracted royal patronage, attracting endowments to support studies, and these endowments established, states Hartmut Scharfe, what may be "the earliest case on record of a university scholarship". Some of these medieval era mathas of Hinduism in Andhra Pradesh, Karnataka, Kerala and Tamil Nadu, were for Vedanta studies, but some mathas from the 700 to 1000 CE period predominantly focussed on Shaivism, Vaishnavism, military, martial arts, music, painting or other fields of knowledge including subjects related to Buddhism and Jainism. There is evidence, states Hartmut Scharfe, of mathas in eastern and northern India from 7th century CE onwards, such as those in Kashmir, Uttar Pradesh particularly in the Hindu holy city of Kashi, Madhya Pradesh, Bihar and Odisha, but these are not from ancient temple inscriptions, but implied from traveller records (Chinese) who visited these regions.

Brahmins were likely involved in the education and oral culture of textual transmission in ancient India through the gurukul tradition, but inscription evidence collected by E. Hultzsch suggests that at least some matha attached to temples were dominated by non-Brahmins by the early 2nd millennium CE.

The mathas and attached temples routinely hosted debating, Vedic recital and student competitions, and these were part of community festivals in the history of South Asia. These mathas were also the centers where many new texts were composed, as well as the libraries and repository of ancient and medieval manuscripts, where the old texts were preserved and decaying copies replaced over the centuries. The Thiruvavaduthurai Adhinam – a Shaiva matha about twenty kilometers northeast of Kumbhakonam, for example, was a major source of preserved palm-leaf manuscripts of ancient Tamil literature for the colonial era scholars trying to rediscover historic Indian literature. The four major Advaita mathas state in their founding documents that the respective responsibility of the mathas was to preserve one Veda each. Some Hindu monasteries offered hospice care for pilgrims and various forms of assistance to their local communities.

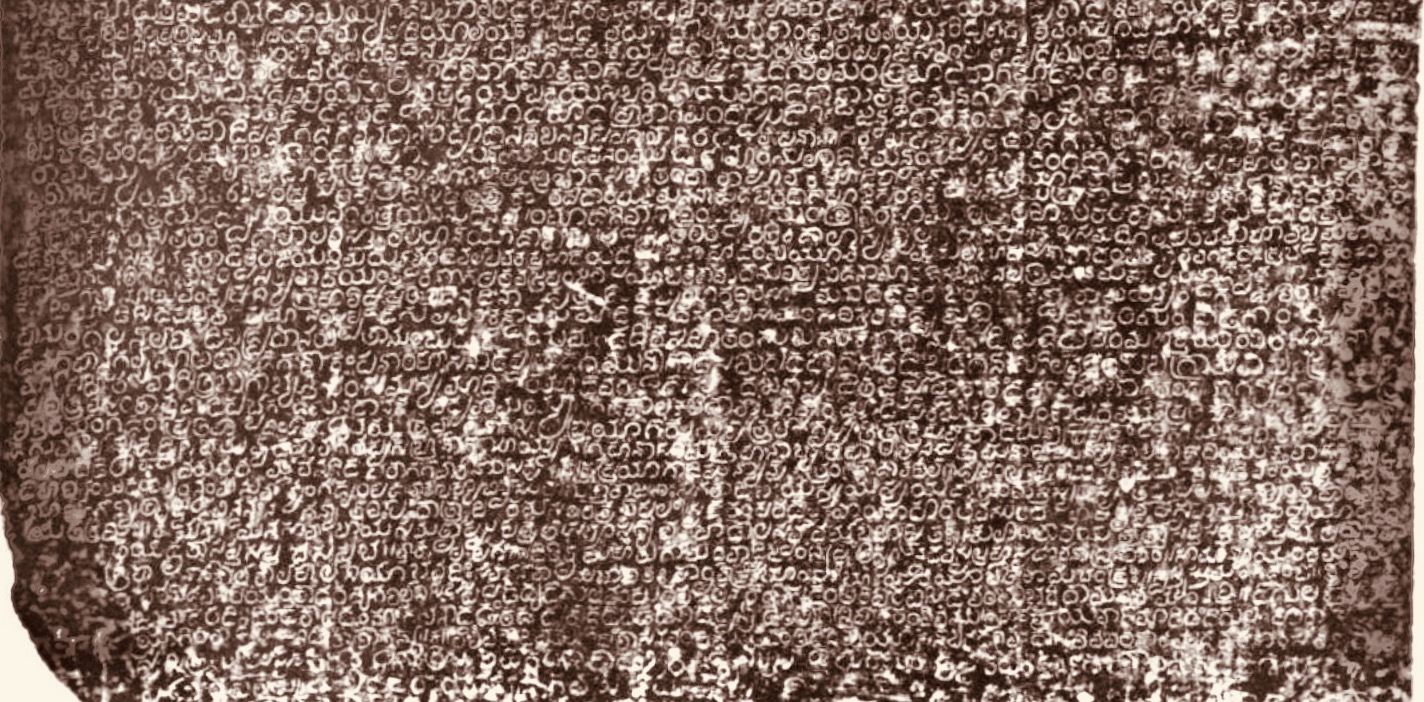
12th-century Kodiya matha stone inscription.

Hindu mathas and temples – like Buddhist monasteries – had by the 10th-century attached medical care along with their religious and educational roles. This is evidenced by various inscriptions found in Bengal, Andhra Pradesh and elsewhere. An inscription dated to about 930 CE states the provision of a physician to two matha to care for the sick and destitute. Similarly, a stone inscription in Andhra Pradesh dated to about 1262 CE mentions the provision of a prasutishala (maternity house), vaidya (physician), an arogyashala (health house) and a viprasattra (kitchen) with the religious center where people from all social background could be fed and cared for.

The historical role of mathas as knowledge and services repository is attested in early Sanskrit texts, as well as many historical inscriptions found along the ruins of Indian temples and monasteries. For example, several stone inscriptions in Sanskrit and Western Chalukya era Kannada have been found near the Shiva temple and monastery in a village near Dharwad district (northwest Karnataka–Maharashtra border). These slabs have been dated to between 1094 and 1215 CE. One of these includes the role of Kodiya–matha – also referred to as the Dakshina Kedarasvera matha. It states:

There is the Kōḍiyamaṭha, the place of Dakṣiṇakēdāra (dakṣiṇakēdārasthāna), location of a beautiful field of crops [which are] like hairs bristling for the worship of the Śivaliṅga; the established place (niṣṭhitasthāna) for the ritual practice of the Śaiva ascetics who are perpetual chaste students; a place for the self-recitation (svādhyāyasthāna) of the four Vedas —the Ṛg, Yajus, Sāma, and Ātharva— along with their ancillary treatises; a place for teaching (byākhyānasthāna) grammar, like the systems of Kumāra, Pāṇini, Śākaṭāyana, and the Śabdānuśasana; a place for teaching the six systems of philosophy—namely the Nyāya, Vaiśeṣika, Mīmāṃsā, Sāṃkhya, Buddhist, etc.; a place for teaching the treatises on Yoga— namely the Lākulasiddhānta, the work of Patañjali, and others; a place for various [branches of] learning (vividhavidyāsthāna), such as the 18 Purāṇas, the Dharmaśāstras, all Kāvya compositions, drama, dance, and so on; a place for the provision of food (annadā- nasthāna) to the poor, the helpless, the crippled, the blind, the deaf, story-tellers, singers, musicians, flute-players, dancers, Vaitāḻikas, the naked, the injured, the mendicants coming from various regions, like Jain mendicants, those bearing a single or triple staff, the haṃsa and paramahaṃsa mendicants; a place for the medical treatment (bhaiṣajyasthāna) of the diseases of the many helpless and sick; a place for offering protection (abhāyapra- dānasthāna) to all living beings.– Stone inscription (1162 CE), Shiva temple and monastery, Sanskrit-Kannada hybrid (Tr: Florinda De Simini)

== Organization ==
The matha is a monastery, often with numerous students, many teachers and an institutionalized structure to help sustain and maintain its daily operations. Their organization is more sophisticated than an Ashrama or Gurukul which is usually boutique and caters to a smaller group of students. A matha, like a college, designates teaching, administrative and community interaction functions, with prefix or suffix to names, with titles such as Guru, Acharya, Swami and others. In Lingayat Shaiva mathas for example, teachers are Gurus, the administrative functions the responsibilities of Acharyas, and the community relations of Swami. A similar organization is found in Vaishnava mathas.

=== Acharya ===
The word Acharya in Hindu monastic tradition refers to either a Guru of high rank, or more often to the leader of a monastery and sampradaya (teaching institution, denomination). This position typically involves a ceremonial initiation called diksha by the monastery, where the earlier leader anoints the successor as Acharya.

In large denominations that ran a collection of historical monasteries, an Acharya may refer to the leader of a regional monastery school operated in that denomination. Alternate titles of the heads of Hindu monasteries are Jeer, Jiyar or Ciyar. The chief of a collection of large Hindu monasteries in a sampradaya has been sometimes referred to as Jagad guru.

=== Guru ===
The matha host not only students but many Guru. A Guru, in Hindu tradition, is someone who is a "teacher, guide or master" of certain knowledge. He or she is someone more than a teacher, traditionally a reverential figure to the student, with the guru serving as a "counselor, who helps mold values, shares experiential knowledge as much as literal knowledge, an exemplar in life, an inspirational source and who helps in the spiritual evolution of a student." The term also refers to someone who primarily is one's spiritual guide, who helps one to discover the same potentialities that the guru has already realized. The guru concept is traceable to ancient Vedic times, found in traditional schools as well as a matha.

The oldest references to the concept of guru are found in the earliest Vedic texts of Hinduism. The guru, and gurukul – a school run by guru, were an established tradition in India by the 1st millennium BCE, and these helped compose and transmit the various Vedas, the Upanishads, texts of various schools of Hindu philosophy, and post-Vedic Shastras ranging from spiritual knowledge to various arts. The mathas hosted these teachers and their students as they pursued their studies.

By about mid 1st millennium CE, archaeological and epigraphical evidence suggest numerous larger institutions of gurus existed in India, some near Hindu temples, where guru-shishya tradition helped preserve, create and transmit various fields of knowledge. The first epigraphical evidence of a Shaiva matha, for example, dates to around 800 CE, which was attached to a temple. It hosted scholars and students for theosophical studies. Another inscription from about 1100 CE, states Hartmut Scharfe, attests that a matha was the center of medieval medical studies (Charaka Samhita) and of Vedic grammar in Tamil Nadu.

== Mathas in Hindu traditions ==
=== Vaishnavism ===
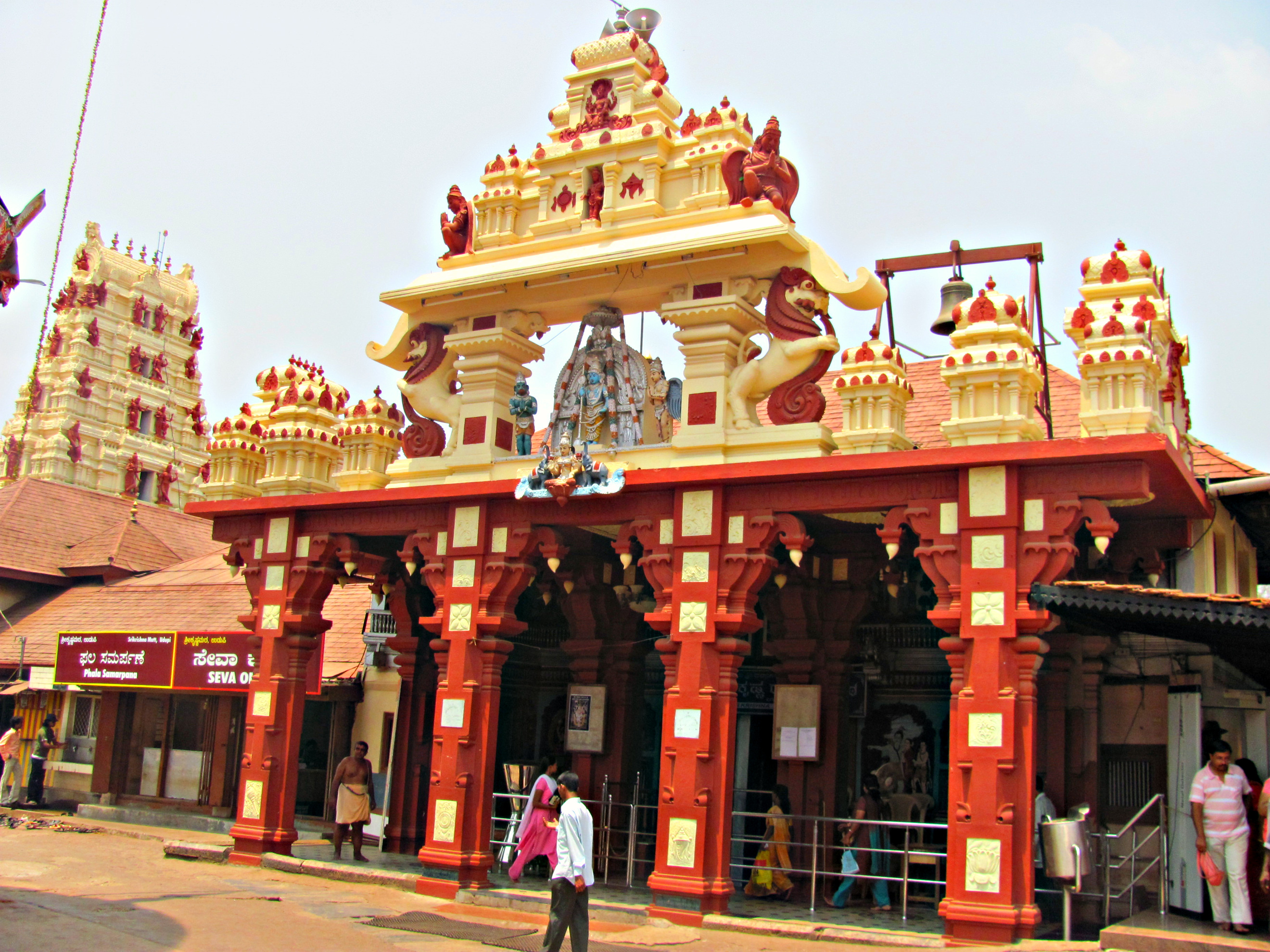
The Entrance to Udupi Sri Krishna Matha at Udupi, Karnataka.

==== Dvaitha (Madhva) Mathas ====
Madhvacharya, the founder of Dvaita Vedanta school of Hindu philosophy, studied in an Advaita Vedanta monastery, but found Advaita unconvincing, and launched theistic Dvaita school of Vedanta interpretation, establishing Mathas (monasteries) by the early 13th century. There are twenty four Madhva mathas set up all over India, including those in Udupi. The twelve Mathas that are descended through Madhvacharya's direct disciples, Adhokshaja Teertha, Hrishikesha Teertha, Narasimha Teertha, Upendra Teertha, Rama Teertha, Vamana Teertha, Janardhana Teertha and Madhva's brother Vishnu Tirtha in Tulu region are the Pejawara Matha, Palimaru Matha, Adamaru Matha, Puttige Matha, Sodhe Matha, Kaniyooru Matha, Shiroor Matha, Krishnapura Matha, Bhandarakeri Matha, Subramanya Matha, Chitrapura Matha, Bhimanakatte Matha. Out of these twelve Madhva Mathas, the first eight are referred to as Ashta Mathas of Udupi. These eight surround the Anantheswara Krishna Hindu temple. These mathas are laid out in a rectangle, the temples on a square grid pattern. The monks in the matha are sannyasis, and the tradition of their studies and succession (Paryaya system) were established by Madhvacharya. Along with twelve mathas, there are ten mathas that are descended through Madhvacharya's direct disciples, Padmanabha Tirtha, Narahari Tirtha, Madhava Tirtha, Akshobya Tirtha and Akshobya Tirtha's disciple Jayatirtha. They are Uttaradi Matha, Vyasaraja Matha, Raghavendra Matha, Sripadaraja Matha, Kanva Matha, Baligaru Matha, Kudli Matha, Tambehalli Matha (also known as Majjigehalli Maṭha), Kundapur Matha, Sagarakatte Matha. Out of the ten, the first three, the Uttaradi Matha, Vyasaraja Matha and Raghavendra Matha, are considered to be the three premier apostolic institutions of Dvaita Vedanta and are jointly referred as Mathatraya . It is the pontiffs and pandits of the Mathatraya that have been the principle architects of post-Madhva Dvaita Vedanta through the centuries. As a matter of fact, these have taken the lion's share in the task of developing and propagating the philosophy of Madhva. For this reason they can unhesitatingly be regarded as the intellectual heirs to the legacy of Madhva, Jayatirtha and Vyasatirtha.

The main center of Madhva's tradition is in Karnataka. The monastery has a pontiff system, that rotates after a fixed period of time. The pontiff is called Swamiji, and he leads daily Krishna prayers according to Madhva tradition, as well as annual festivals. The process and Vedic mantra rituals for Krishna worship in Dvaita monasteries follow the procedure written by Madhvacharya in Tantrasara.

The succession ceremony in Dvaita school involves the outgoing Swamiji welcoming the incoming one, then walking together to the icon of Madhvacharya at the entrance of Krishna temple in Udupi, offering water to him, expressing reverence then handing over the same vessel with water that Madhvacharya used when he handed over the leadership of the monastery he founded.

The monastery include kitchens, bhojan-shala, run by monks and volunteers. These serve food daily to nearly 3,000 to 4,000 monks, students and visiting pilgrims without social discrimination. During succession ceremonies, over 10,000 people are served a vegetarian meal by Udupi bhojan-shalas.

Other Dvaita Mathas include:

- Kashi Math, Varanasi, Uttar Pradesh
- Gokarna Math, Poinguinim, Canacona, Goa

==== Sri Vaishnava Mathas ====
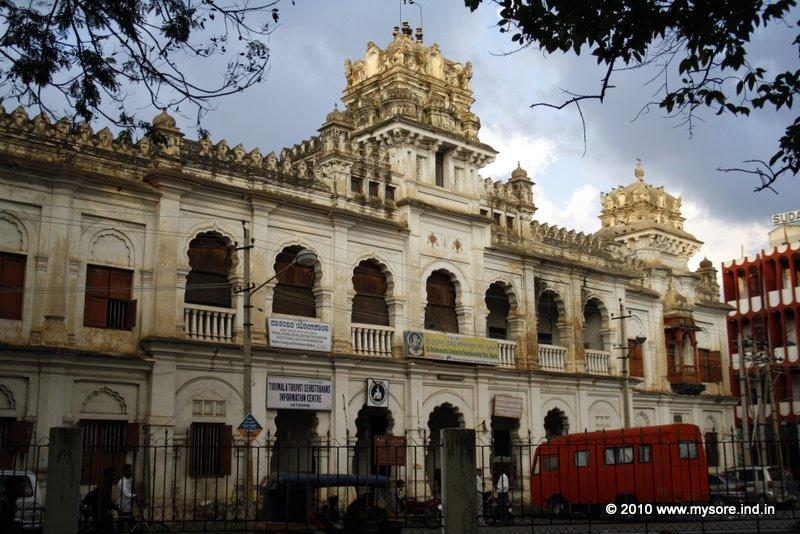
Parakala Mutt at Mysore, Karnataka.

Ramanuja, the Sri Vaishnavism philosopher, studied at an Advaita Vedanta monastery with Yadava Prakasha before disagreeing with Advaita idealism, and launching his Vishishtadvaita (qualified Advaita) philosophy. Ramanuja was nominated as the leader of the Srirangam matha, after the death of Yamunacharya, though they never met. Along with his philosophy, Ramanuja is famous for his organizational skills and the lasting institutional reforms he introduced at Srirangam paralleling those at Advaita monasteries of his time. He also travelled and founded many Sri Vaishnavism mathas across India. The Sri Vaishnavism tradition believes that Ramanuja started 700 mathas, but historical evidence suggests several of these were started later.

The Sri Vaishnavism mathas over time, subdivided into two, those with Tenkalai (southern) tradition and Vadakalai (northern) tradition of Sri Vaishnavism. The Tenkalai-associated mathas are headquartered at Srirangam, while Vadakalai mathas are associated with Kanchipuram. Both these traditions have from 10th-century onwards considered the function of mathas to include feeding the poor and devotees who visit, hosting marriages and community festivals, farming temple lands and flower gardens as a source for food and worship ingredients, being open to pilgrims as rest houses, and this philanthropic role of these Hindu monasteries continues. In the 15th-century, these monasteries expanded by establishing Ramanuja-kuta in major South Indian Sri Vaishnavism locations. (Note: The two matha traditions differ on their theology on the nature of salvation and the role of God's grace, as well as their differing positions on how goddess Lakshmi and god Vishnu relate to each other while agreeing that both are important.)

Some Srivaishnavism monasteries include:

- Melukote – matha founded by Ramanuja
- Srirangam – Tenkalai Srivaishnavism matha
- Vanamamalai – Tenkalai Srivaishnavism matha
- Tirukkurungudi – Tenkalai Srivaishnavism matha
- Kanchipuram – Vadakalai Srivaishnavism matha
- Ahobila – Vadakalai Srivaishnavism matha
- Parakala – Vadakalai Srivaishnavism matha

==== Nimbarka Vaishnava Mathas ====
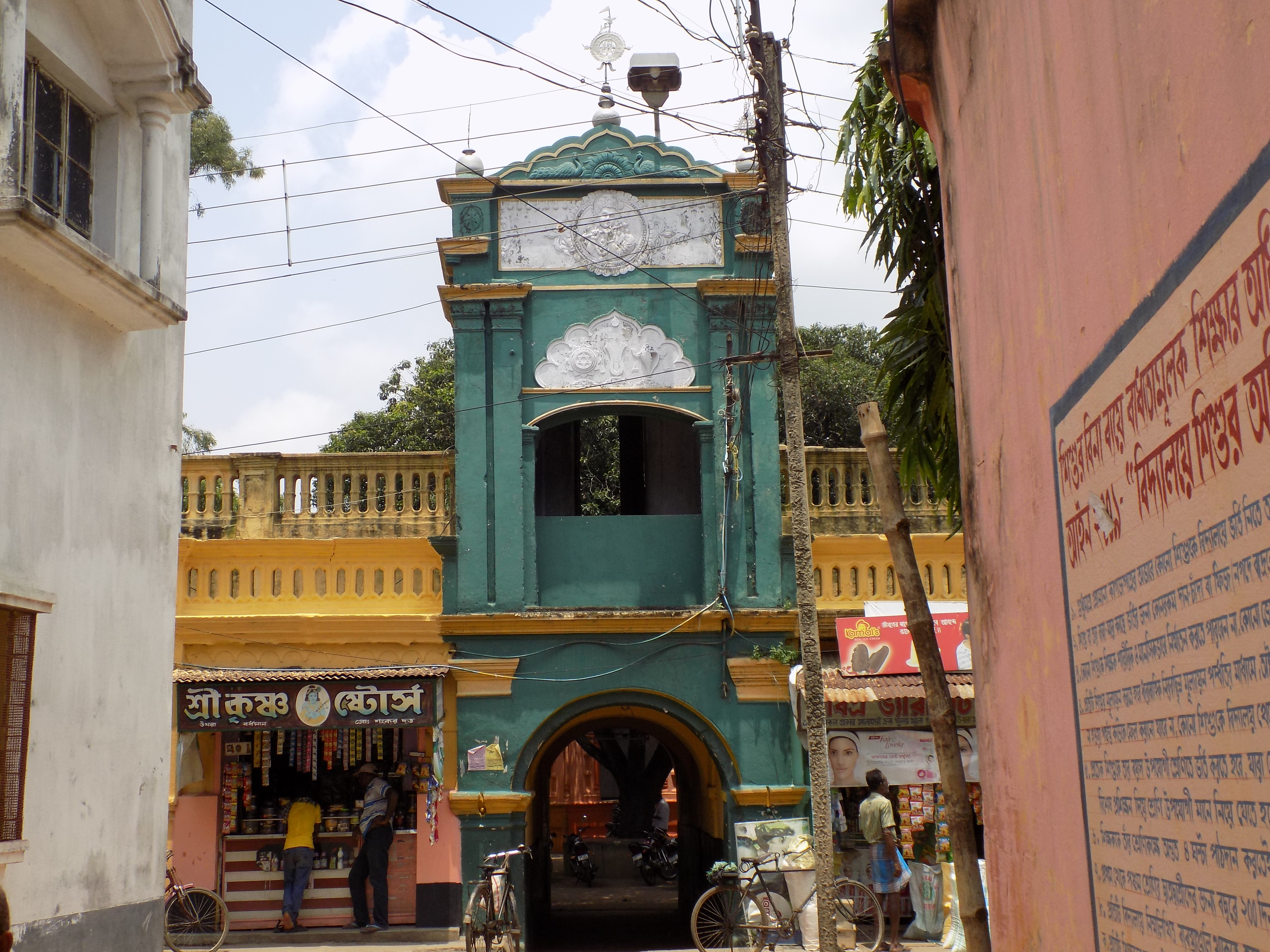
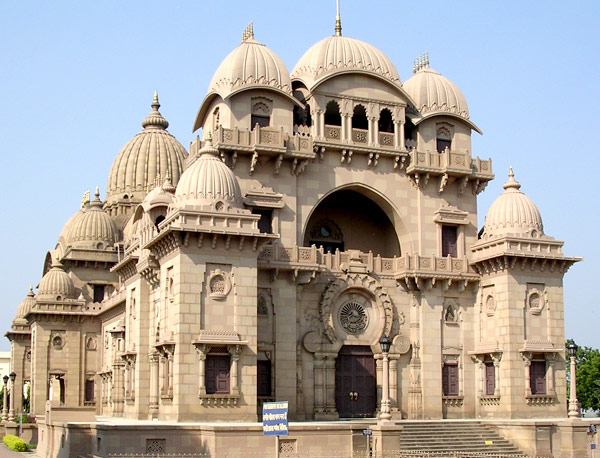
Left: Ukhra Matha, West Bengal (Nimbarka Vaishnavism).
Right: Belur Math, West Bengal (Ramakrishna Math).

Nimbarka, a scholar variously dated to be from 11th to 13th century, proposed a compromise that was inclusive of all Vedanta schools, stating that everyone is right, that truth is simultaneously Advaita, Vishishtadvaita and Dvaita at the same time, calling his philosophy as Dvaitadvaita or Bhedabheda system. He moved to Vrindavan-Mathura, and launched a matha centered around loving devotion to Radha-Krishna (Radheshyam) worship. This group emphasized togetherness of community, public singing and constant bhakti. The Mathas of this group are:

- Kathia Baba ka Sthaan at Vrindavan
- Nimbarkacharya Peeth at Salemabad, Rajasthan
- Ukhra Mahanta Asthal at Ukhra, West Bengal
- Howrah Nimbarka Ashram at Howrah

==== Ramanandi Vaishnava Mathas ====
Ramananda was a 14th-century Vaishnava devotional poet sant of Bhakti movement, in the Ganges river region of Northern India. He studied in an Advaita Vedanta monastery, joined the Ramanuja's Sri Vaishnavism tradition, then proceeded to start god Rama-based Vaishnavism movement from Hindu holy city of Varanasi. The Hindu tradition recognizes him as the founder of the Ramanandi Sampradaya, the largest monastic Hindu renunciant community in modern times. The monasteries of these ascetics are found particularly in the northern and western states of India, in Nepal, but they are also found as wandering monks.

The largest mathas of the Ramanandi tradition are in Ayodhya and Varanasi, and Ramanandi monks are also known as Bairagis or Vairagis (literally, detached ones), their groups called Akharas. The Ramanandi mathas are historically notable for being part of warrior ascetics movement in medieval India, where monks metamorphosed into a militant group, trained in arms, rebelled against Islamic rule and at times cooperated with the British colonial officials as mercenaries.

Known for his egalitarian views in a time of political uncertainty and Hindu-Islam conflicts, Ramananda and his matha accepted disciples without discriminating anyone by gender, class, caste or religion (he accepted Muslims). Traditional scholarship holds that his disciples included later Bhakti movement poet-sants such as Kabir, Ravidas, Bhagat Pipa and others, however some postmodern scholars have questioned some of this spiritual lineage while others have supported this lineage with historical evidence. His ideas also influenced the founding of Sikhism in 15th century, and his teachings are included in the Sikh scripture Guru Granth Sahib. Shri Ramcharitmanas is a key text of this matha.

==== Other Vaishnava Mathas ====
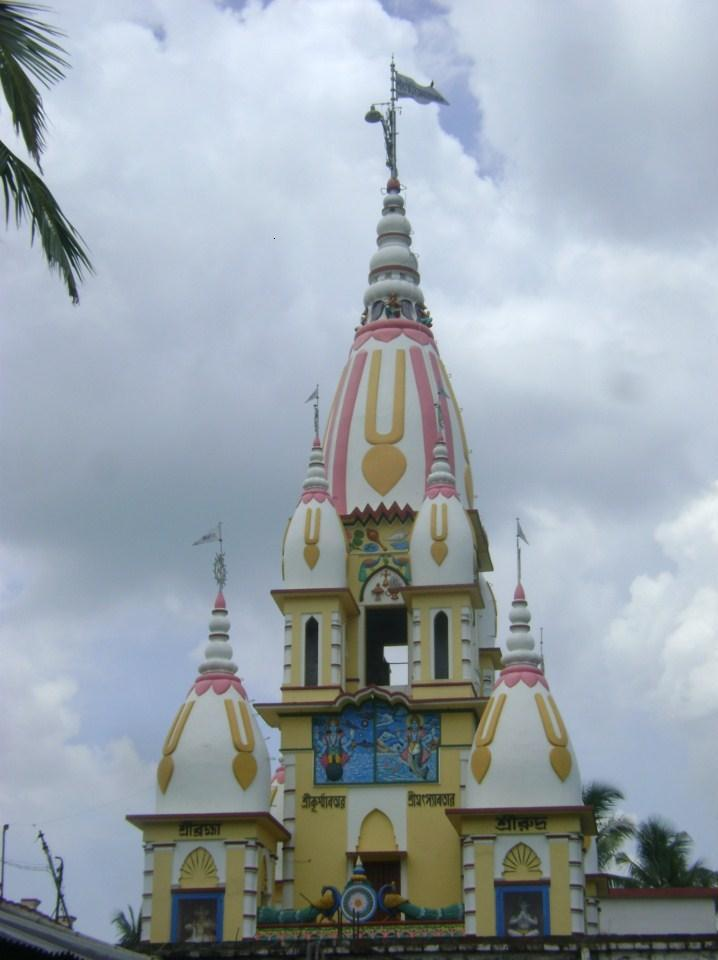
Sri Devananda Gaudiya Math at Nabadwip, West Bengal.

- Yadugiri Yathiraja Mutt
- Gaudiya Matha
- Narasingha Chaitanya Matha
- Sree Rama Dasa Matha, Chenkottukonam, Thiruvananthapuram
- Bhubaneswar matha

=== Advaita Mathas ===
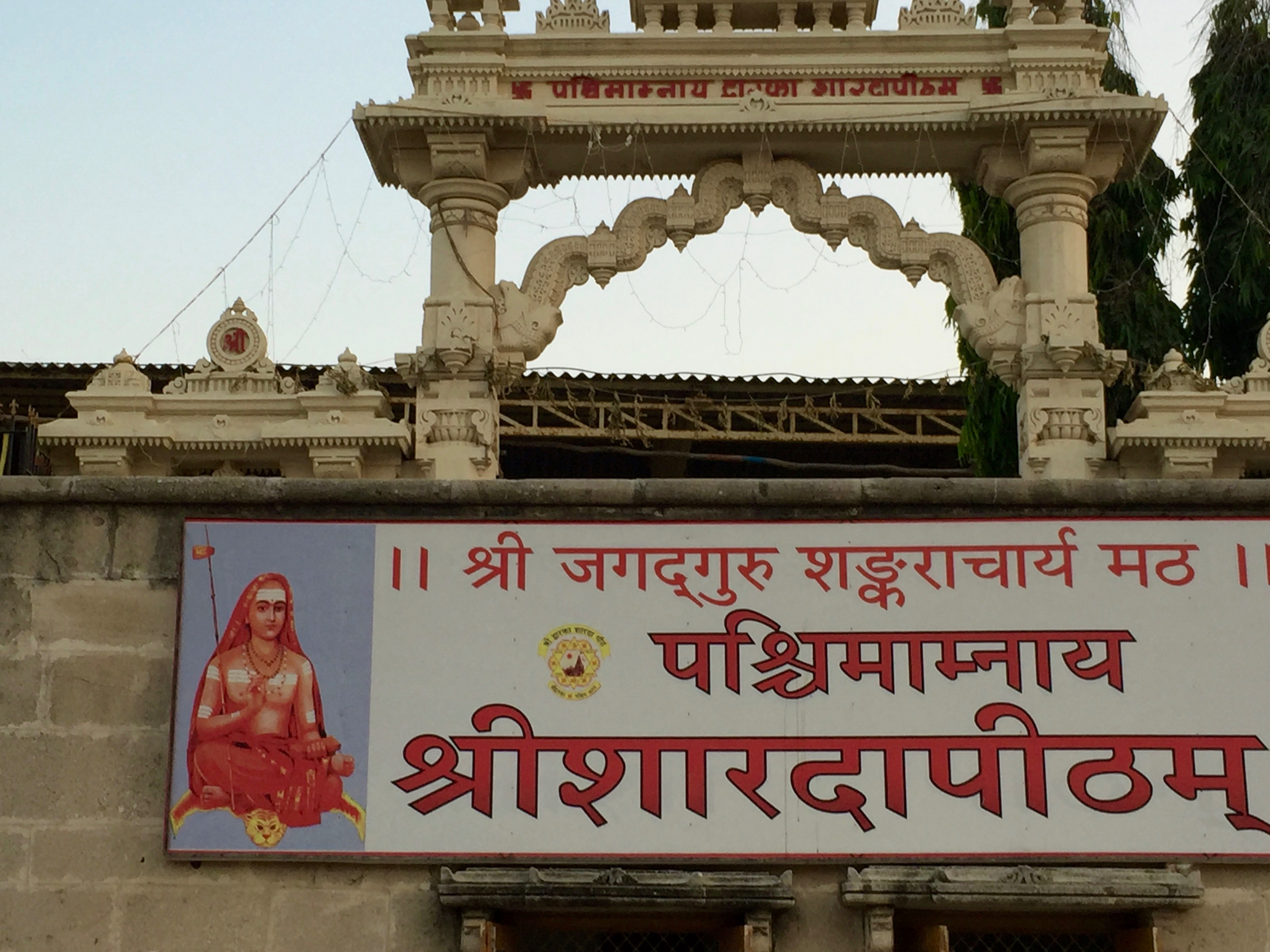
An Advaita Vedanta matha started by Adi Shankara next to the Dwarka temple in Gujarat.

While Shankara is traditionally regarded as the founder of the most famous monasteries in Hinduism, there are no records of those mathas before the 14th century. In the 14th century, the founders of the Vijayanagara Empire started to patronize Sringeri matha. In the late 15th century, the patronage of the Vijayanagara kings shifted to Vaisnavism. Following this loss of patronage, Sringeri matha had to find others means to propagate its former status, and the story of Shankara establishing the four cardinal mathas, as cast in the wholly legendary digvijaya genre, may have originated in the 16th century.

These Advaita mathas have hosted the Daśanāmi Sampradāya under five Maṭhas, with the headquarters at Kanchi matha. Dwarka in the West, Jagannatha Puri in the East, Sringeri in the South and Badrinath in the North. Each math was headed by one of his disciples, called Shankaracharya, who each independently continued the Advaita Vedanta Sampradaya. The ten Shankara-linked Advaita monastic orders are distributed as follows: Bharati, Puri and Saraswati at Sringeri, Aranya and Vana at Puri, Tirtha and Ashrama at Dwarka, and Giri, Parvata and Sagara at Badrinath.

According to tradition, each math was first headed by one of his four main disciples, and the tradition continues since then. Yet, according to Paul Hacker, no mention of the mathas can be found before the 14th century CE. Until the 15th century, the timespan of the directors of Sringeri Math are unrealistically long, spanning 60+ and even 105 years. After 1386, the timespans become much shorter. According to Hacker, these mathas may have originated as late as the 14th century, to propagate Shankara's view of Advaita. (Note: Nakamura also recognized the influence of these mathas, which he argues contributed to the influence of Shankara, which was "due to institutional factors". The mathas which he established remain active today, and preserve the teachings and influence of Shankara, "while the writings of other scholars before him came to be forgotten with the passage of time".) (Note: According to Pandey, these Mathas were not established by Shankara himself, but were originally ashrams established by Vibhāņdaka and his son Ŗșyaśŗnga. Shankara inherited the ashrams at Dvārakā and Sringeri, and shifted the ashram at Śŗngaverapura to Badarikāśrama, and the ashram at Angadeśa to Jagannātha Purī.) According to another tradition in Kerala, after Sankara's samadhi at Vadakkunnathan Temple, his disciples founded four mathas in Thrissur, namely Naduvil Madhom, Thekke Madhom, Idayil Madhom and Vadakke Madhom.

Other Advaita Vedanta mathas following Smarta Tradition include:

- Svarnavalli Matha at Swarnavalli near Sodhe, Sirsi, Karnataka
- Ramachandrapura Math at Haniya, Hosanagara, Karnataka
- Chitrapur Math, Shirali, Karnataka ()
- Shri Gaudapadacharya Math, Kavale, Ponda, Goa
- Sri Samsthan Dabholi Math, Dabholi, Goa
- Ramakrishna Math and Ramakrishna Mission
- Bharat Sevashram Sangha

=== Shaivism ===
Shaiva mathas were established at least from the 1st millennium onwards, in Kashmir, Himalayan regions such as Nepal and throughout the subcontinent such as in Tamil Nadu. Many of the monasteries and attached temples, particularly in the northwest Indian subcontinent, were destroyed by Islamic armies after the 12th-century, and Shaiva monastic network severely disrupted from the consequent violence. In some cases, the Hindu monasteries were converted into Islamic ribats or madrasa (soldier barracks, schools) during the medieval period. The Shaiva monasteries have been from diverse schools of Shaivism, ranging from nondualist to theistic schools, and regionally went by a range of names such as Jogi (Yogis), Natha, Darshani, Kanphata of Gorakshanath sampradaya.

==== Shaiva Siddhanta ====
Shaiva Siddhanta is a theistic school of Shaivism based on dualism (human soul and God are different), and it established matha at least from the middle of 1st millennium CE. Archeological evidence dated to 724 CE suggests the existence of an influential Saiva Siddhanta matha named after Mattamayura. Other historical evidence suggests that these Shaiva monks were active in Shaiva theosophical scholarship and the spread of Shaiva ideas in north and west India till about the 12th century.

Other major monasteries include the Golaki matha that existed by the 10th century, famed for its round temple shape, probably near modern Jabalpur in Madhya Pradesh. This monastery featured a cluster of Shiva temples, a hospital, college and lodging for students. The Golaki matha was a center for Vedic studies with parallel studies of Buddhist literature. Inscription evidence suggests set up numerous Shaiva monasteries in the Deccan region under Kakatiya dynasty sponsorship, many of which were destroyed in Hindu-Muslim wars that ended the Kakatiya rule. The origins of Golaki matha of central India has been traced to more ancient monasteries in Kashmir.

In Karnataka, historical evidence suggests that Queen Alhanadevi established the Shaiva monastery called Kodiya matha which included a temple, monastic lodging and study hall, with scholarship on Vedas, Shastras and Puranas. The Chola dynasty sponsored many influential Shaiva mathas. While many Shaiva monasteries had attached temples, some did not and were entirely dedicated to education and scholarship.

===== Aadheenam =====
Aadheenams are ancient Shaiva Siddhanta monasteries of the Tamil-speaking regions in South India. They are typically headed by a pontiff, who is considered to be an authority on Shaiva Siddhanta and who descends from a recognized lineage of scholars. Aadheenams are often associated with specific communities that are prominent followers of Shaiva Siddhantism, such as the Vellalars and the Nagarathars.

The history of Aadheenams in South India can be traced back to the 6th century CE. The first Aadheenam was founded by the Hindu saint Appar, who is considered to be one of the three Nayanars, or great saints, of Saiva Siddhanta. The other two Nayanars were Sundarar and Tirugnanasambandar.

Aadheenams flourished during the 16th and 17th centuries, during which time they played a major role in the spread of Saiva Siddhanta philosophy. Aadheenams continued to play an important role in South Indian society during the 18th and 19th centuries. They were instrumental in the revival of Saiva Siddhanta philosophy during the 19th century, and they also played a major role in the Indian independence movement.

Aadheenams continue to play an important religious and socio-cultural role within localized parts of South Indian society today. They are centers of learning and spirituality, and they provide social services to the community. As an important part of the social fabric of select regions in Southern India, such as Tanjore or Madura, Aadheenams continue to play a vital role in the Shaivite faith.

Some of the important Aadheenams includes

- Dharmapuram Adheenam
- Thiruvaduthurai Adheenam
- Thiruppanandal Adheenam
- Madurai Adheenam
- Perur Adheenam

In Sri Lanka, outside the historically recorded lineage of Karanavai, local religious institutions and communities claiming an Aadheenam heritage are largely subsequent to the advent of the Hindu Renaissance between the 18th and 20th centuries, during which the Shaiva Siddhantist tradition flourished in northern regions. An example is the Kauai Aadheenam, established in Hawaii following the lineage of a Sri Lankan Tamil tradition.

==== Nath Shaiva Mathas ====
The Nath tradition is a syncretic Yoga and Vedanta schools of Hindu philosophy based Shaiva tradition, that reveres Shiva and Dattatreya. Its founding is attributed to the ideas of Matsyendranath and Gorakshanath, developed further with an additional seven other Siddha Yoga Gurus called "Naths" (literally, lords). The Nath Yogi sampradaya and monastic organizations grew starting with the 13th century, with its matha headquarters in Gorakhpur, Uttar Pradesh. Many of their mathas are found in the northern, central and western states of India particularly in the Himalayas, but archeological inscriptions suggest their mathas existed in south India as well. The early Nath monks received endowments in Karnataka, for example, between the 10th and 13th century, which later became a temple and Shaiva matha hub for them near Mangalore. The Kadri matha, for instance, is one of the legendary monasteries in the Nath tradition which attracted converts from Buddhism and infusion of Buddhist ideas into Shaivism, and it continues to be a part of the Nath Shaiva tradition, particularly during the Kumbh Mela celebrations in modern times.

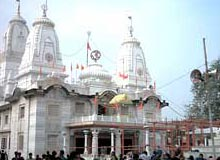
Gorakhnath temple and matha in Gorakhpur, India is one of the major modern matha of the Nath Shaiva tradition.

The Nath Siddha tradition of Shaivism is credited with establishing numerous Shiva Hindu temples and monasteries, particularly in Gujarat, Maharashtra, Madhya Pradesh, Rajasthan, Uttar Pradesh, Himachal Pradesh, north Bihar, and Nepal. The Gorakhnath matha is an active Shaivism monastery named after the medieval saint, Gorakhnath of the Nath sampradaya. The matha and town of Gorakhpur in Uttar Pradesh is named after him. The monastery and the temple performs various cultural and social activities and serves as the cultural hub of the city. The monastery also publishes texts on the philosophy of Gorakhnath.

Nath Shaiva monastic organization was one of those Hindu monk groups that militarized and took up arms following the Muslim conquest of India, to resist persecution. They were scorned and persecuted by Mughal Empire officials, and by social, cultural and religious elites. However, the Nath yogi monks have been very popular with the rural population in South Asia since medieval times.

==== Veerashaiva Lingayatism ====
The matha monastic organization has been active since the emergence of Lingayat movement in Karnataka around the 12th century. They have enjoyed community support, and have served as the center for Shaiva studies as well as Lingayat community's educational, cultural and philanthropic activities. There have been five active large Veerashaiva monasteries, one each at Kedaranath, Vairagya Shimhasana (Himalayas), Kashi Jnana Shimhasana(Varanasi, Ganges), Srisaila Surya Shimhasana (Andhra Pradesh), Rambhapuri Veeashimhasana-Balehonnuru ( Karnataka) and Ujjini Saddharma Shimhasana (Karnataka)

There are other important veerashaiva mathas which are famous for "trividha" dasoha(food, shelter and education)

*taralabalu brihanmatha sirigere

started by jagadguru marulasiddeshwara in twelfth century, to abolish social discrimination

*siddaganga matha tumkur

*shivaratrishwara matha sattur

*Gavi Math/Matam, Uravakonda, Andhra Pradesh.

*Sri Murugha Math, Chitradurga, karnataka.

Taralubalu Math, Sirigeri, karnataka

Moorusavira Math, Hubli, Karnataka

Siddharooda Math, Hubli, Karnataka

Tontadarya Math, Gadag, Karnataka

There are smaller Vira-Shaiva monasteries, and rural branch monasteries, across India that serve the needs of the local Lingayat communities.

The Lingayat monasteries have associated priestly class who are referred to as the Veerashaiva Jangama’s, but this class is not part of the monastery and often householders. Anyone, from any social class, can become a Lingayat monk and join its monastery, and the internal organization has allowed social mobility from its earliest days. The Jangamas often officiate rites of passage, such as wedding. The succession in Veerashaiva branch monasteries may be appointed either by the main monastery, or the local chief may name his successor.

==== Other Shaiva mathas ====
- Adichunchanagiri Hills
- Sivatirtha matha
- Hardwar matha
- Nasik matha
- Caughera matha (Nepal)
- Dhinodara matha

== Matha in Jainism ==
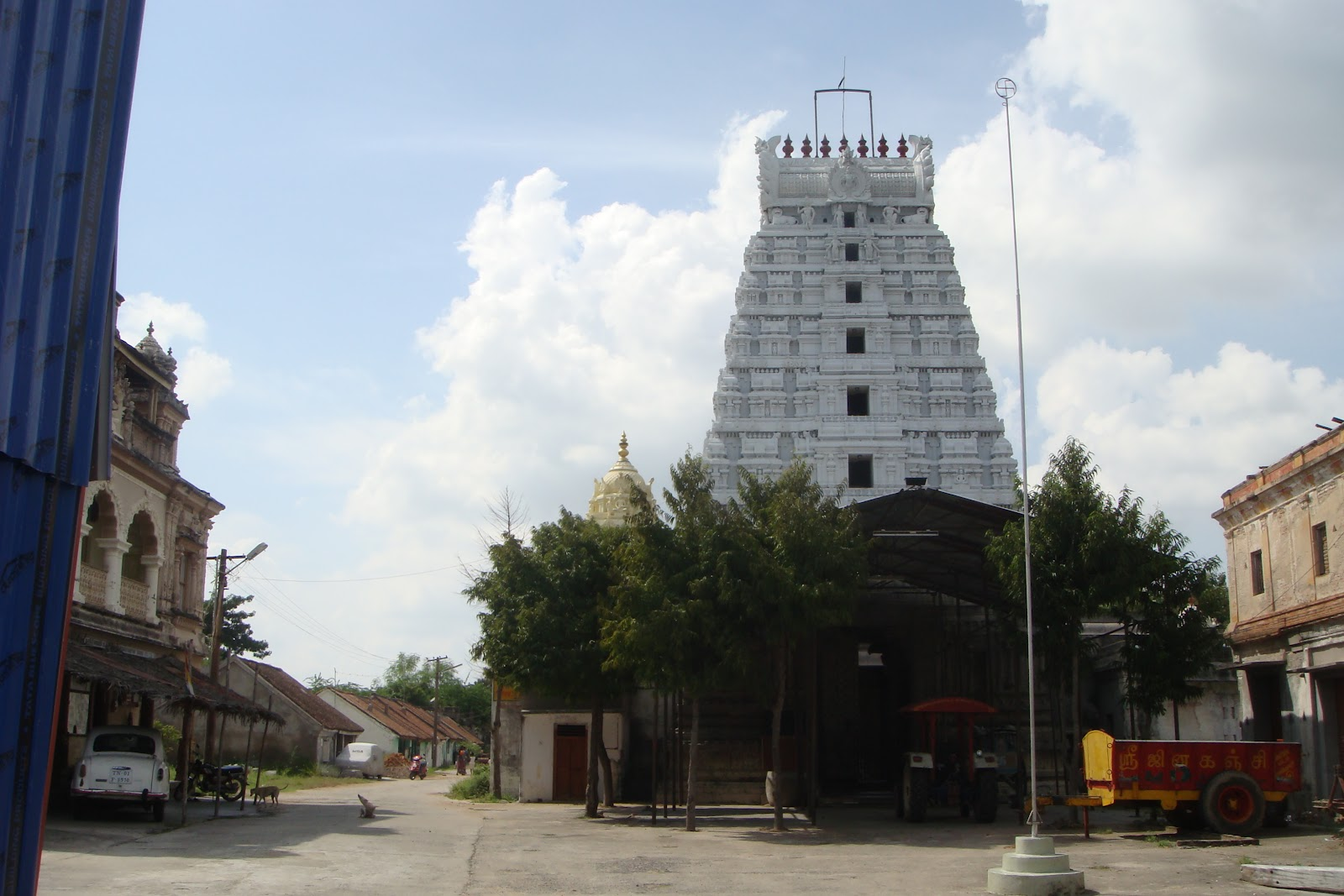
Mel Sithamur Jain Math, the residence of Bhattaraka Laxmisena

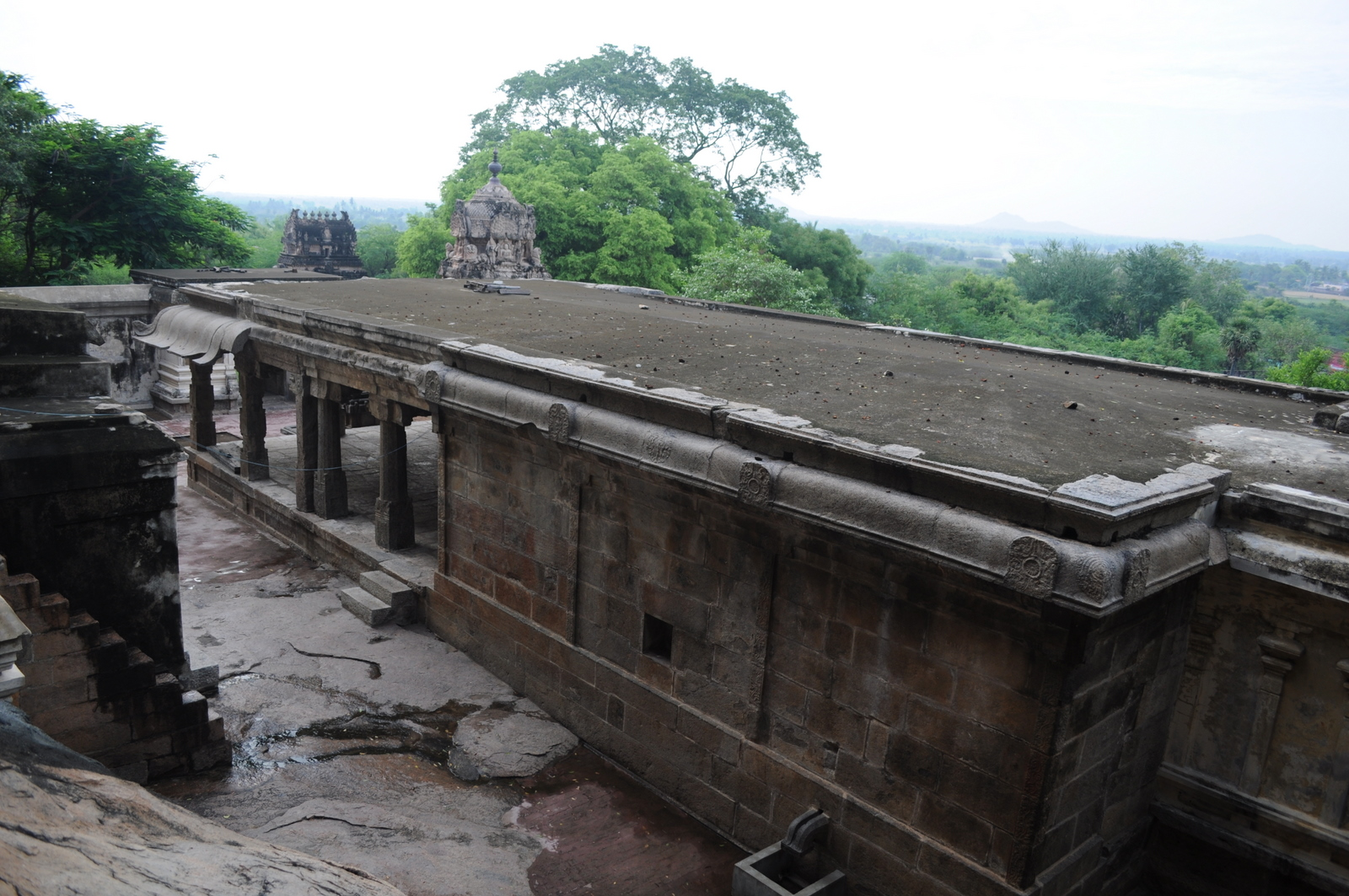
Arahanthgiri Jain Math

Jain monasteries, states Paul Dundas, have also been called Matha. Archaeological evidence from Tamil Nadu, which has generally survived better than rest of South Asia, suggest monasteries were being built near Jain temples in south India in about the 5th-century CE, and these hosted naked monks of Jainism. In other parts, Jaina mathas received royal support along with Buddhist and Hindu monasteries. According to Jaina texts of the 13th to 15th century, such as by the historian Srutasagara Gani, Jaina monks in these matha were persecuted by Muslim officials for their way of life, thereby suggesting that the matha tradition had continued in the first half of the 2nd millennium.

The term matha is also used for Jain monasteries. Some Jain Mathas are:

- Shravana Belgola Math
- Moodabidri
- Mel Sithamur Jain Math
- Arahanthgiri Jain Math
- Kumbhoj
- Kanakagiri Jain Matha
- Humbaj
- Karkala
- Amminabhavi
- Kambadahalli
- Sonda Jain Math
- Lakkavalli Jain Matha
- Kolhapur
- Nandani Jain Matha

== Sources ==
- Clark, Matthew (2006), The Daśanāmī-saṃnyāsīs. The Integration Of Ascetic Lineages Into An Order, BRILL
- Hacker, Paul (1995), Philology and Confrontation: Paul Hacker on Traditional and Modern Vedanta, SUNY Press, ISBN 978-0-7914-2582-4
- Hebbar, B.N (2005). The Sri-Krsna Temple at Udupi: The History and Spiritual Center of the Madhvite Sect of Hinduism. Bharatiya Granth Nikethan. ISBN 81-89211-04-8.
- Johnston, William M. (2013). Encyclopedia of Monasticism. Routledge. ISBN 978-1-136-78715-7.
- Leela Prasad (2007). Poetics of Conduct: Oral Narrative and Moral Being in a South Indian Town. Columbia University Press. ISBN 978-0-231-13920-5.
- Leela Prasad (2010). Anand Pandian; Daud Ali (eds.). Ethical Life in South Asia. Indiana University Press. ISBN 978-0-253-35528-7.
- Nakamura, Hajime (1950), A History of Early Vedanta Philosophy. Part Two (2004 Reprint), Delhi: Motilal Banarsidass Publishers Private Limited
- Pandey, S.L. (2000), Pre-Sankara Advaita. In: Chattopadhyana (gen.ed.), "History of Science, Philosophy and Culture in Indian Civilization. Volume II Part 2: Advaita Vedanta", Delhi: Centre for Studies in Civilizations
- Scharfe, Hartmut (2002), "From Temple schools to Universities", Education in Ancient India: Handbook of Oriental Studies, Brill Academic, ISBN 978-9004125568
- Sharma, B. N. Krishnamurti (2000). A History of the Dvaita School of Vedānta and Its Literature, Vol 1. 3rd Edition. Motilal Banarsidass (2008 Reprint). ISBN 978-8120815759.
- AK Shastri (1999), History of Shringeri, 2nd Edition, Karanatak University Press, OCLC 220890841
