= Ukhra Mahanta Asthal =

- উখরা মহন্ত অস্থল
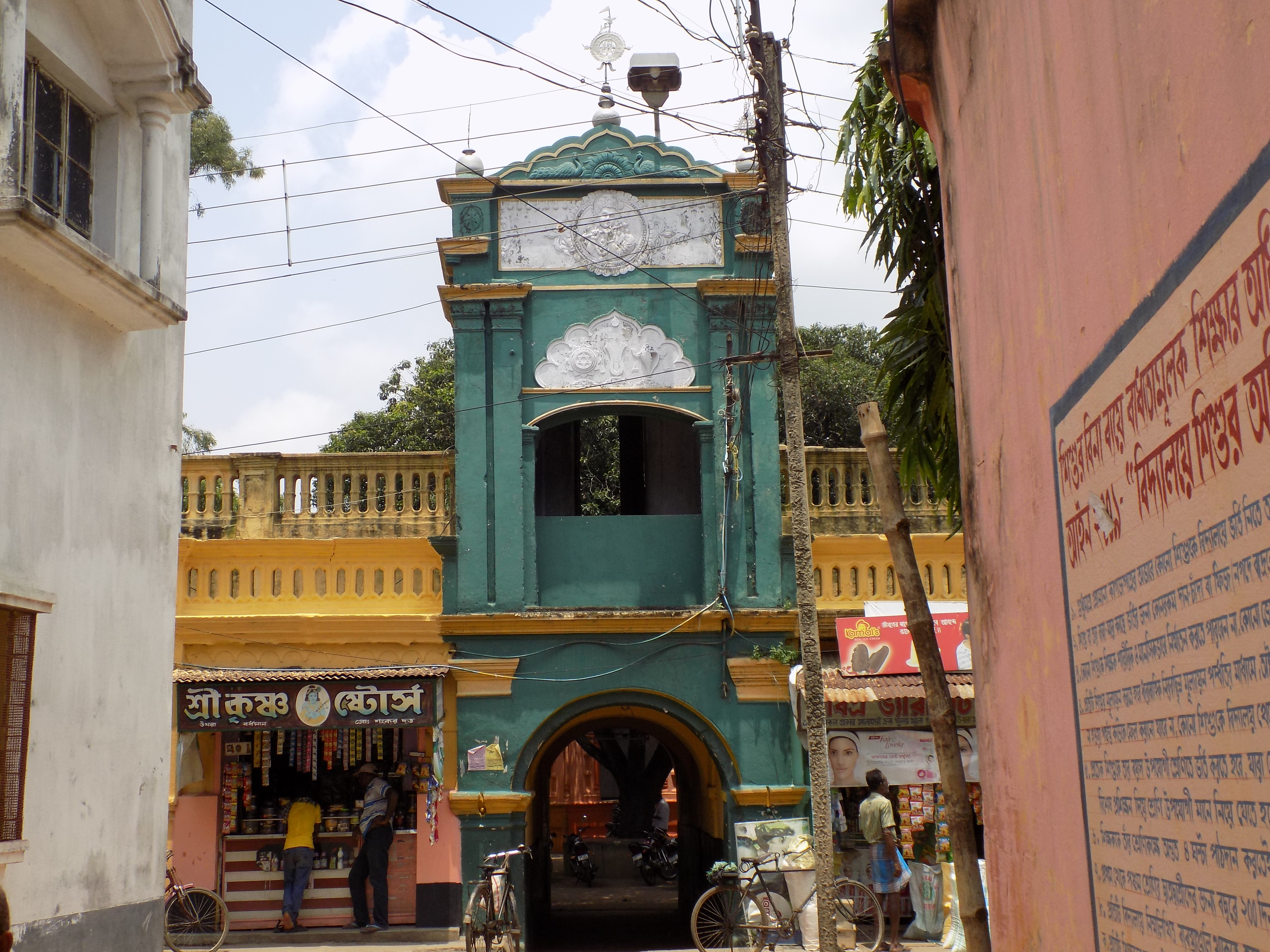
- Main entrance of the Ukhra Nimbarka Peeth Mahanta Asthal

Religion
- Affiliation: Nimbarka Sampradaya, Vaishnavism, Dvaitadvaita Vedanta
- District: Burdwan
- Leadership: presently headed by Sri Kamalāsharan Devāchārya

Location
- Location: Ukhra, West Bengal
- State: West Bengal

Architecture
- Type: Mutt with Navaratna temple
- Founder: Dayaram Devacharya

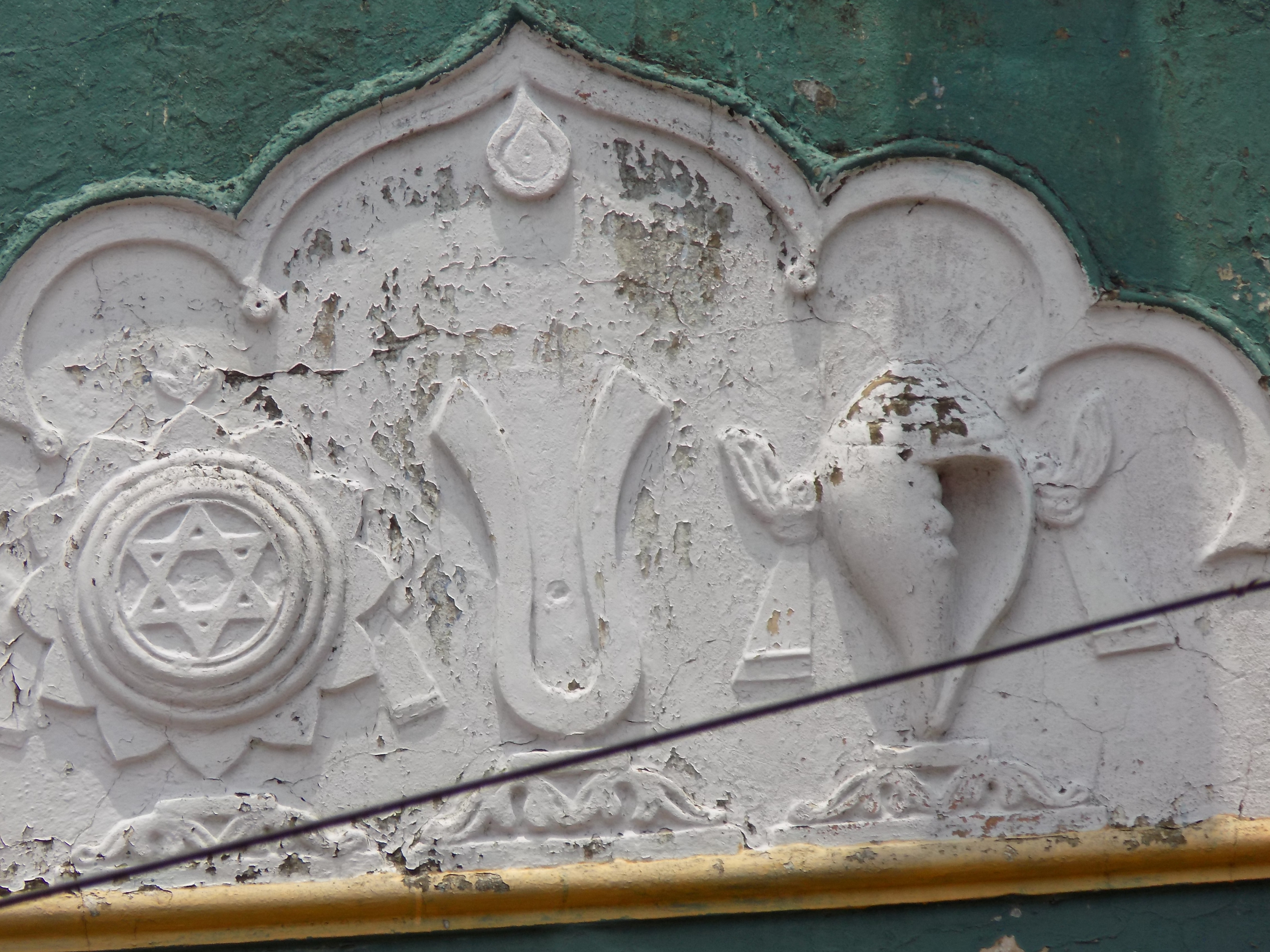
Shankha-Chakra-Urdhvapundra of the Nimbarka sampradaya

Ukhra Nimbarka Peeth Mahanta Asthal is a 250-year-old Mutt (Hindu monastic establishment) of the Nimbarka Vaishnava Sampradaya. It is situated at Ukhra in the district of Paschim Bardhaman, in the state of West Bengal, India near the city of Durgapur. This Mutt has been closely associated with the Zamindars of Ukhra, the Handa family, and has served as the spiritual beacon of the area. Since its foundation this Mutt has propagated Vaishnavism of the Nimbarka Sampradaya far and wide in the area and gained many important personalities as adherents of its philosophy.

== Foundation ==
This Mutt was founded in the mid-18th century by Swami Dayaram Devacharya of the Nimbarka Sampradaya, who was one of the three main disciples of Swami Narahari Devacharya (founder of Burdwan Mahanata Asthal) who belonged to the Dwaar of the hoary Nimbarki saint Sri Swabhuram Devacharya. To this Dwaar belong the Kathia Babas, including the famous Ramdas Kathiababa. Since then the spiritual lineage has passed on from Guru to disciple in the traditional Hindu way. Mahantas (pontiffs) of this Mutt are Vaishnava renunciates, called Brahmacharis or Vairagis (i.e. dispassionate monks), and are known for their strictly devotional, austere regimen who devote their lives to divine service.

== Main Deities ==
This Mutt’s temple houses the holy icons of the main deities of the Nimbarka, Vaishnava Sampradaya, Sri Radha-Madhav, Yugal Bihari jiu, as well as a number of Shalagramas, all of which are regularly worshiped. It also has holy icons of Sri Nimbarkacharya, along with Sri Hamsa Bhagavan, Gopal, and Vishnu, among others.

== Temple of the Mutt ==
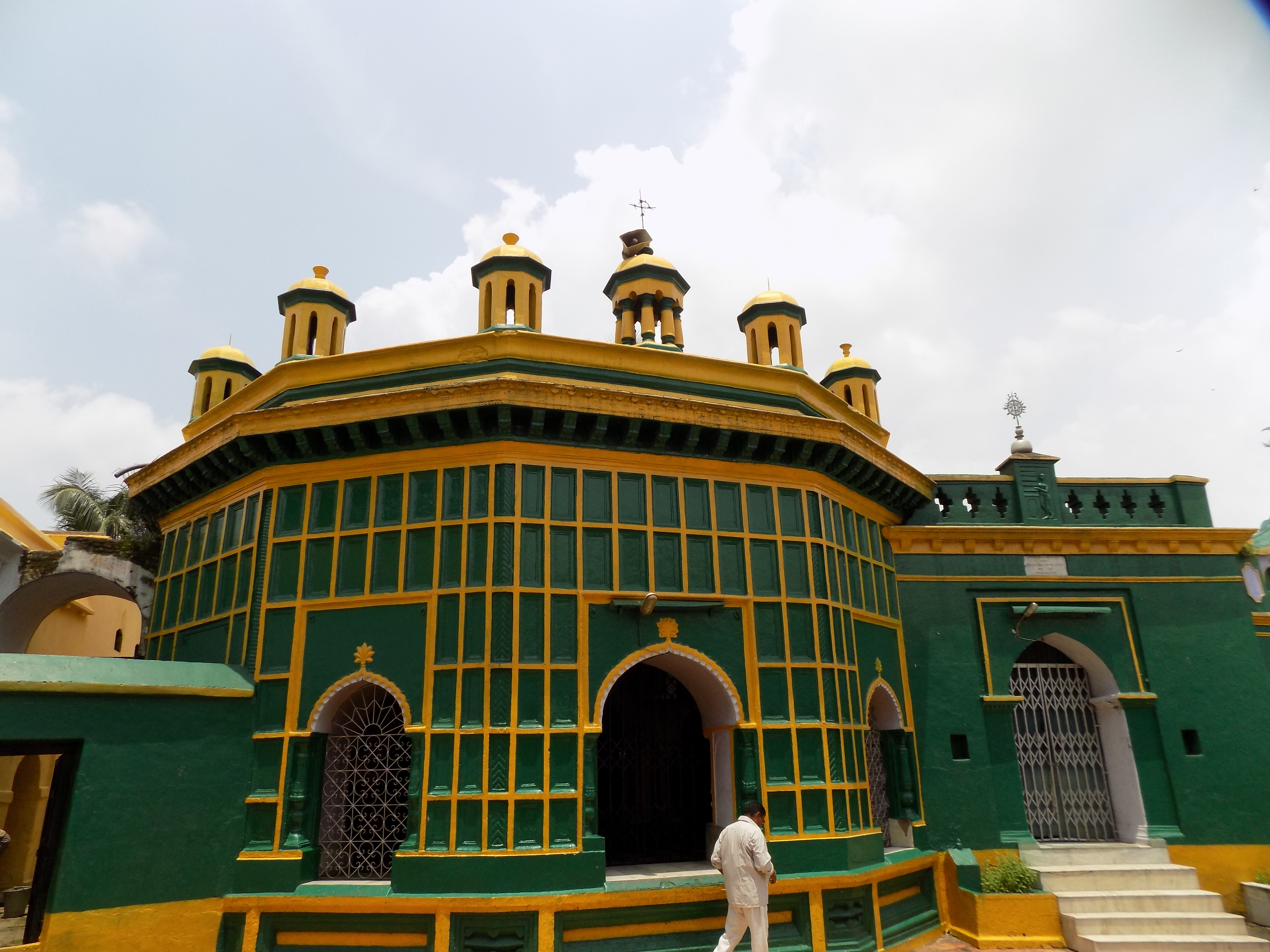
The main nine-pinnacled temple of Ukhra Nimbarka Peeth which houses the holy icon of Lord Krishna along with several other icons of Vaishnava deities.

This Mutt’s temple is an architectural spectacle and stands as an evidence of Bengal’s old architectural style. It is a Navaratna (i.e. Nine pinnacled) temple and incorporates architectural styles of Brajbhoomi, i.e. areas centering on Mathura-Vrindavan and Bengal. The floor of the temple is unique; besides being chequered, it has British era silver coins embedded in its floor at the cross sections.

Quite miraculously a tulasi (basil) plant grows from a crevice of the cornice of this temple serving as a testimony to the sacredness of this place consecrated by the presence of holy icons as well the saints who have spent their lives of devotion and sacrifice over here.

== Raas and Jhulan festival ==
The Raas and Jhulan festivals premised on the legendary Raas lila of Lord Krishna was initiated by Swami Uddhav Ghamand Devacharya of the Nimbarka Vaishnava sampradaya. Since then this tradition has been adopted by all Vaishnava sects. The Raas and Jhulan festivals of this Mutt are famous throughout the area, and thousands of devotees throng the place during the time of this festival. It has a beautiful Raas Mancha. The large hall housing an ornately decorated throne in the hall meant for the Jhulan Utsav is a transfixing sight. The sublime philosophy of Lord Krishna's Raas is well captured in the serene and holy ambiance of this sacred spot.

== Mahantas of the past and present ==
This place has seen the presence of legendary saints who were towering spiritual personalities of their times; many of them had actively propagated Nimbarka Vaishnavism and have to their credit the establishment of several bastions of spirituality. One of the former Mahantas, Swami Damodarchandra Brajavasi, ordered his disciple to establish the Nimbarka Mutt at Kenduli in the district of Birbhum, which is famed for being the birthplace of the medieval Bengali Vaishnava poet Jayadeva Goswami.

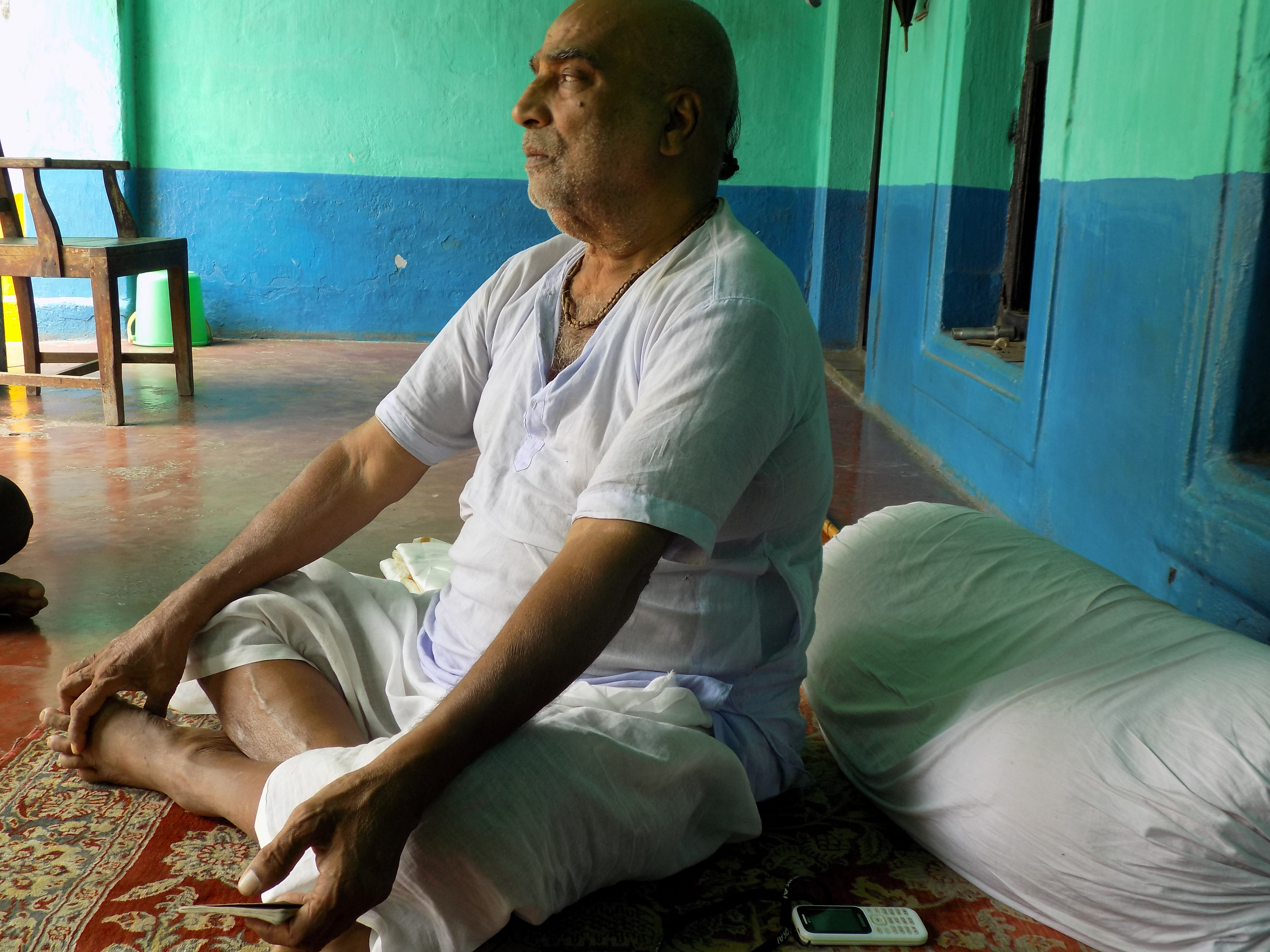
The present Mahanta of Ukhra Nimbarka Peeth Mahanta Asthal Sri Kamalāsharan Devāchārya sitting on the porch in front of his room

As of 2015, it is headed by an affable, self-effacing saint with an ever-smiling countenance, Mahanta Sri Kamalāsharan Devāchārya, who happens to be the 58th Acharya in the Nimbarka Vaishnava spiritual lineage. He is the spiritual successor and main disciple of the former Mahanta, late Sri Shukdevsharan Devacharya.

== Financial woes ==
Owing to forcible acquisition of land by the government for Andal airport and the forcible and often unlawful confiscation of land and other property for various purposes by the government and others, the Mutt is at present facing a financial crisis, in spite of the present Mahanta ensuring proper renovations and extensive re-painting of several important sections of the establishment, especially the temple.

== See also ==
- Nimbarka Sampradaya
- Vaishnavism
- Ramdas Kathiababa
