= Parakala Matha =

Monastery in Mysore, India

Coordinates: 12.307438°N 76.650846°E

- ಪರಕಾಲ ಮಠ
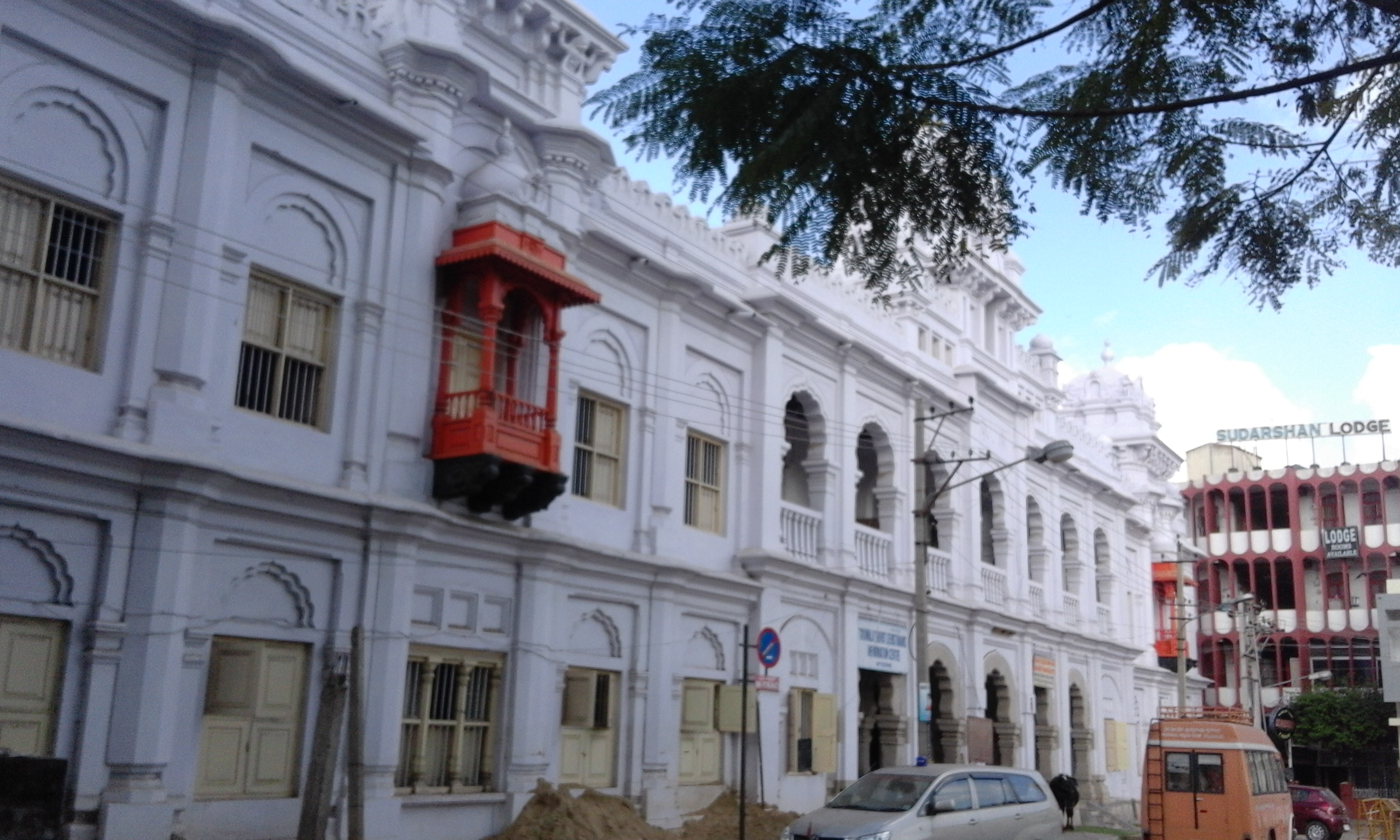
- Entrance to the headquarters of Parakala Matha at Mysore, Karnataka

Monastery information
- Full name: Bramhatantra Swatantra Parakala Matha
- Denomination: Sri Vaishnavism
- Established: 1268

People
- Founder(s): Sri Brahmatantra Swatantra Jeeyar
- Important associated figures: Thirumangai Alvar, Vedanta Desika, the Wadiyars

Site
- Public access: Yes
- Website: https://www.parakalamatham.org

Bramhatantra Swatantra Parakala Matha, commonly known as Parakala Matha, is a Hindu Sri Vaishnava monastery founded during the Hoysala Empire in 1268 at Mysore, Karnataka, primarily worshipping Vishnu and Lakshmi as Hayagriva and Vageesha. It is the first mediaeval era monastery of the Vadakalai denomination within Vaishnavism in the Hindu society and is the gurupeeta, the seat of the royal guru, of the maharajas of Mysore.

Originally founded in Mysore where its headquarters has been based, the matha has branches across southern India and as well as one abroad.

== Etymology ==
Parakala is a Sanskrit adjective meaning "beyond time". It is an epithet of Vishnu's incarnation as Narasimha, and by derivation means "he who is beyond time". Alvar Tirumangai, an influential figure in the monastery's history, earned parakala as an honorary style for his scholarship, after whom the monastic came to be known as Parakala Matha.

== History ==
Parakala Matha was first founded by Brahmatantra Swatantra Jeeyar, a disciple of Swami Vedanta Desika, during the reign of the Hoysala emperor Narasimha III. It is among the monasteries that view Vedanta Desika as the torchbearer of Āchārya Ramanuja's Vishishtadvaita teachings, the others being Ahobila Matha at Ahobilam, Andavan Ashramam at Srirangam, and Andavan Ashramam at Poundarikapuram. The Hayagriva idol worshipped at the hermitage is said to have been handed down from Vedanta Desika himself.

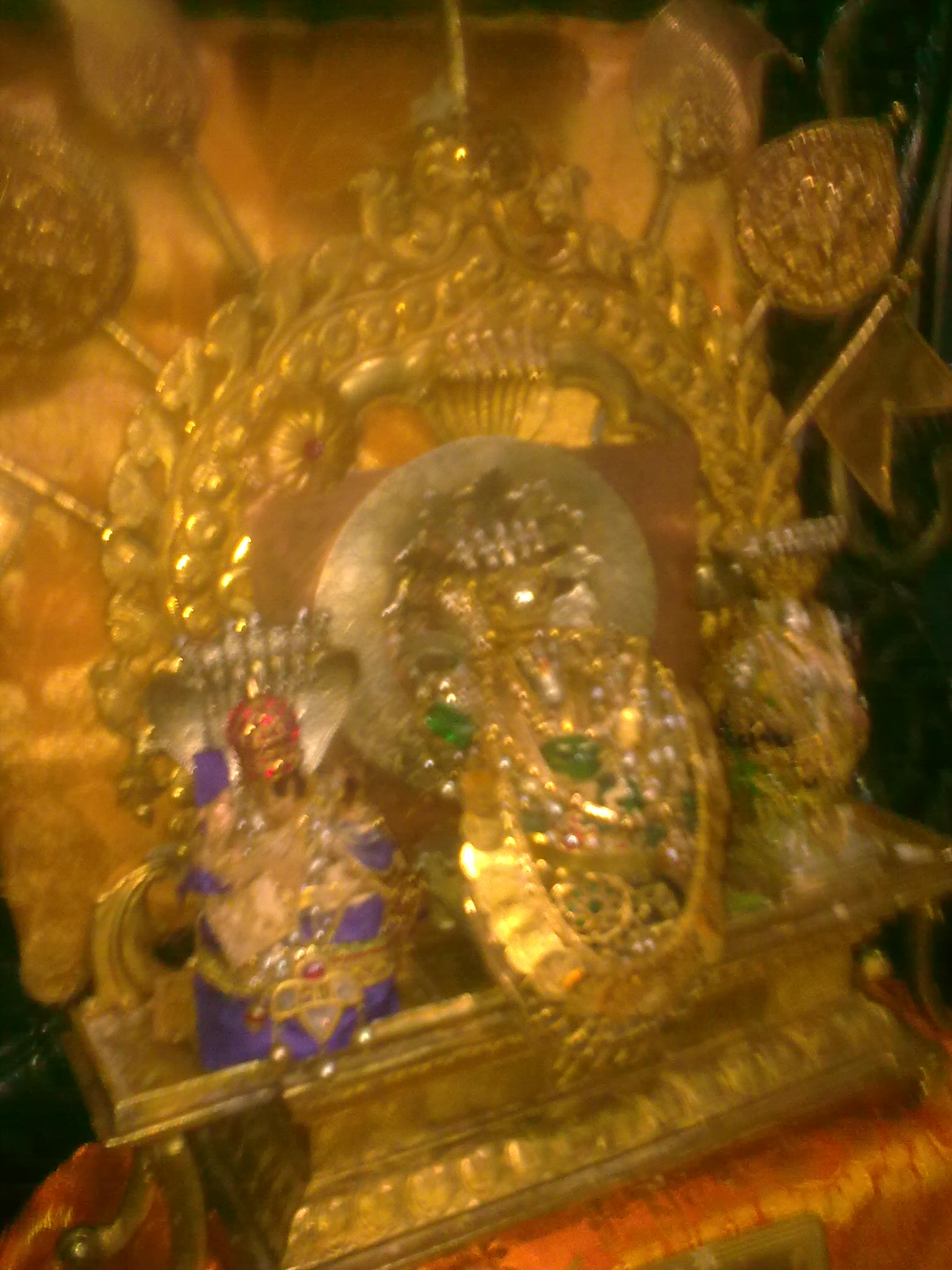
The presiding deity of Sri Parakala Matha: Lord Sri Lakshmi Hayagreeva Swami (at the centre)

== Āchārya tradition ==
There have been a total of thirty-six āchāryas (pontiffs or principal seers) so far.

The head of the matha is also the hereditary raja guru of the Mysore Royal Family. The matha has thus had connections with the monarchs of Mysore Kingdom since 1399, one of the reasons for the proximity of Jaganmohana Palace and Mysore Palace to it. Most of the royal ceremonies are officiated by seers of the hermitage.

=== List of āchāryas ===
	Portrait	Guru/Āchārya	Full name	Presided
Founding āchāryas
		Nigamantha Desikan	Sri Nigamantha Maha Desikan	1268 - 1369
Disciple āchāryas
1		Perarulāla	Śri Lakshmi Hayavadana Divya Pādukā Sevaka Śri Perarulāla Jîyar Brahmatantra Swatantra Swāmi	1286 - 1386
2		Aiyan Appai	Śri Lakshmi Hayavadana Divya Pādukā Sevaka Śri Vātsya Vêdānta Rāmānuja ‘Perarulāla Aiyan Appai’ Dviteeya Brahmatantra Swatantra Swāmi	1386 - 1394
3		Śrinivasa	Śri Lakshmi Hayavadana Divya Pādukā Sevaka Śri Śrinivasa Triteeya Brahmatantra Swatantra Swāmi	1394 - 1406
4		Parakāla Swami	Śri Lakshmi Hayavadana Divya Pādukā Sevaka Śri Parakāla Brahmatantra Swatantra Swāmi	1406 - 1424
5		Rāmānuja	Śri Lakshmi Hayavadana Divya Pādukā Sevaka Śri Vêdānta Rāmānuja Brahmatantra Swatantra Swāmi	1425 - 1440
6		Śrinivasa	Śri Lakshmi Hayavadana Divya Pādukā Sevaka Śri Śrinivasa Brahmatantra Swatantra Swāmi	1440 - 1460
7		Nārāyana	Śri Lakshmi Hayavadana Divya Pādukā Sevaka Śri Nārāyana Brahmatantra Swatantra Swāmi	1460 - 1482
8		Rangaraja	Śri Lakshmi Hayavadana Divya Pādukā Sevaka Śri Rangaraja Brahmatantra Swatantra Swāmi	1482 - 1498
9		Maha Deśikan Swami	Śri Lakshmi Hayavadana Divya Pādukā Sevaka Śri Brahmatantra Swatantra Maha Deśikan	1498 - 1517
10		Yatirāja	Śri Lakshmi Hayavadana Divya Pādukā Sevaka Śri Yatirāja Brahmatantra Swatantra Swāmi	1517 - 1535
11		Varada	Śri Lakshmi Hayavadana Divya Pādukā Sevaka Śri Varada Brahmatantra Swatantra Swāmi	1535 - 1552
12		Parānkusha	Śri Lakshmi Hayavadana Divya Pādukā Sevaka Śri Parānkusha Brahmatantra Swatantra Swāmi	1552 - 1567
13		Simha	Śri Lakshmi Hayavadana Divya Pādukā Sevaka Śri Kavitaarkika Simha Brahmatantra Swatantra Swāmi	1567 - 1583
14		Yativarya	Śri Lakshmi Hayavadana Divya Pādukā Sevaka Śri Vêdānta Yativarya Brahmatantra Swatantra Swāmi	1583 - 1607
15		Jnanābdhi	Śri Lakshmi Hayavadana Divya Pādukā Sevaka Śri Jnanābdhi Brahmatantra Swatantra Swāmi	1607 - 1618
16		Veeraraghava	Śri Lakshmi Hayavadana Divya Pādukā Sevaka Śri Veeraraghava Brahmatantra Swatantra Swāmi	1619 - 1640
17		Varada	Śri Lakshmi Hayavadana Divya Pādukā Sevaka Śri Varada Vêdānta Brahmatantra Swatantra Swāmi	1640 - 1652
18		Varāha	Śri Lakshmi Hayavadana Divya Pādukā Sevaka Śri Varāha Brahmatantra Swatantra Swāmi	1652 - 1663
19		Lakshmana	Śri Lakshmi Hayavadana Divya Pādukā Sevaka Śri Vêdānta Lakshmana Brahmatantra Swatantra Swāmi	1663 - 1673
20		Yogindra	Śri Lakshmi Hayavadana Divya Pādukā Sevaka Śri Varada Vêdānta Yogindra Brahmatantra Swatantra Swāmi	1673 - 1676
21		Periya Parakala	Śri Lakshmi Hayavadana Divya Pādukā Sevaka Śri Periya Parakāla 'Dodda Parakāla' Brahmatantra Swatantra Swāmi	1676 - 1738
22		Śrinivasa	Śri Lakshmi Hayavadana Divya Pādukā Sevaka Śri Śrinivasa Brahmatantra Swatantra Parakāla Swāmi	1738 - 1750
23		Vêdānta Swami	Śri Lakshmi Hayavadana Divya Pādukā Sevaka Śri Vêdānta Brahmatantra Swatantra Parakāla Swāmi	1750 - 1770
24		Śrinivasa	Śri Lakshmi Hayavadana Divya Pādukā Sevaka Śri Abhinava Śrinivasa Brahmatantra Swatantra Parakāla Swāmi	1770 - 1771
25		Rāmānuja	Śri Lakshmi Hayavadana Divya Pādukā Sevaka Śri Rāmānuja Brahmatantra Swatantra Parakāla Swāmi	1771 - 1810
26		Ghantāvatāra Swami	Śri Lakshmi Hayavadana Divya Pādukā Sevaka Śri Ghantāvatāra Brahmatantra Swatantra Parakāla Swāmi	1810 - 1828
27		Vêdānta Swami	Śri Lakshmi Hayavadana Divya Pādukā Sevaka Śri Vêdānta Brahmatantra Swatantra Parakāla Swāmi	1828 - 1835
28		Śrinivasa	Śri Lakshmi Hayavadana Divya Pādukā Sevaka Śri Śrinivasa Brahmatantra Swatantra Parakāla Swāmi	1835 - 1860
29		Śrinivasa	Śri Śrinivasa Desikendra Brahmatantra Swatantra Parakāla Swāmi	1860 - 1873
30		Ranganatha	Śri Ranganatha Brahmatantra Swatantra Parakāla Swāmi	1873 - 1885
31	Sri Krishna Parakala Swami 31st Pontiff of Parakāla Matham	Krishna	Śri Krishna Brahmatantra Swatantra Parakāla Swāmi	1885 - 1915
32	His Holiness Sri Sri Sri Abhinava Vageesa Brahmatantra Swatantra Parakala Swami, 32nd Pontiff of Sri Parakala Mutt	Vāgeesha	Śri Vāgeesha Brahmatantra Swatantra Parakāla Swāmi	1915 - 1925
33		Ranganātha	Śri Abhinava Ranganātha Brahmatantra Swatantra Parakāla Swāmi	1925 - 1966
34	Śri Abhinava Śrinivasa Brahmatantra Swatantra Parakāla Swāmi 34th Pontiff of Parakāla Mutt	Śrinivasa	Śri Abhinava Śrinivasa Brahmatantra Swatantra Parakāla Swāmi	1966 - 1972
35	Śri Abhinava Rāmānuja Brahmatantra Swatantra Parakāla Swāmi 35th Pontiff of Parakāla Mutt	Rāmānuja	Śri Abhinava Rāmānuja Brahmatantra Swatantra Parakāla Swāmi	1972 - 1992
36	Śri Abhinava Vāgeesha Brahmatantra Swatantra Parakāla Swāmi 36th Pontiff of Parakāl̥a Mutt	Vāgeesha	Śri Abhinava Vāgeesha Brahmatantra Swatantra Parakāla Swāmi	1992–present

== See also ==
- Sri Vaishnavism
- Ramanuja
- Vedanta Desika
- Ahobila Matha
- Srirangam Srimad Andavan Ashramam
- List of Heritage Buildings in Mysore
