= Musuvinakoppalu =

- Village
- Location in Karnataka, India
- Coordinates: 12°13′35″N 76°56′40″E
- Country: India
- State: Karnataka
- District: Mysore
- Talukas: T.Narasipura

Government
  - Type: Grama Panchayath
  - Body: Karnataka State Government
- Elevation: 638 m (2,093 ft)

Population (2001)
  - Total: 850

Languages
  - Official: Kannada
- Time zone: UTC+5:30 (IST)
- PIN: 571110

Musuvinakoppalu is a village in T. Narasipura taluk of Mysuru district in southern state Karnataka in India. This village is the headquarters of Muttalavadi Grama Panchayath in Sosale holbali in T. Narasipura Taluk. It is on the left banks of Kaveri River.

== Transport ==
Musuvinakoppalu is connected by road with its taluk headquarters T. Narasipura (T. Narasipura - Musuvinakoppalu Road), Doddebagilu and Horalahalli. KSRTC provides buses from T. Narasipura to Musuvinakoppalu twice a day.
