= Srirangam Srimad Andavan Ashramam =

The Srirangam Srimad Andavan Ashramam is a Hindu institution of the Sri Vaishnava tradition dedicated to the propagation of Ramanuja's and Vedanta Desika's philosophy of Vishishtadvaita. The head of the institution is known as the "Andavan" or "Andavan Swamigal", a title that is believed to be given by the deity Ranganatha himself to the first seer.

It is often listed with other institutions of this tradition, such as the Parakala Matha, Ahobila Matha and the Poundarikapuram Andavan Ashramam.

The main activities of the institution include conducting the sacraments of samashrayana and bharanyasa, kalakshepams (higher spiritual lessons), and Vedic and Western education through schools and secular colleges, managing and funding various temples and Divya Desams, and spreading the teachings of Ramanuja through its various centres.

== Centres ==
The headquarters of this ashrama (hermitage) is in Srirangam, associated with its acharyas (preceptors). The institution has centres spread across India and the United States. Most centres have both temples and schools. Some cities that contain ashrams of this institution are Mumbai, New Delhi, Bangalore (two centres), Nellore, Kolkata, Chennai, Brindavan, Badrinath, Hyderabad (two centres), Aurangabad, and Tirupati. The institution also runs an Arts and Science college in Srirangam.

== Worship ==
The main symbol of worship and the central theme of the institution's philosophical approach is Ranganatha's padukas (sandals). The deity venerated in this ashram is Venugopala, a form of Krishna.

== Pontiff ==
The current pontiff is Sri Varaha Mahadesikan (Andavan), a scholar (with traditional doctoral-equivalents) in nyaya and tarka (logic) and Vishishtadvaita Vedhanta.

== See also ==
- Sri Vaishnavism
- Ramanuja
- Vedanta Desika
- Ahobila Mutt
- Parakala Mutt
