= Sosale =

- town
- Interactive map of Sosale
- Coordinates: 12.233°N 76.917°E
- Country: India
- State: Karnataka
- District: Mysore district
- Elevation: 635 m (2,083 ft)

Languages
  - Official: Kannada
- Time zone: UTC+5:30 (IST)

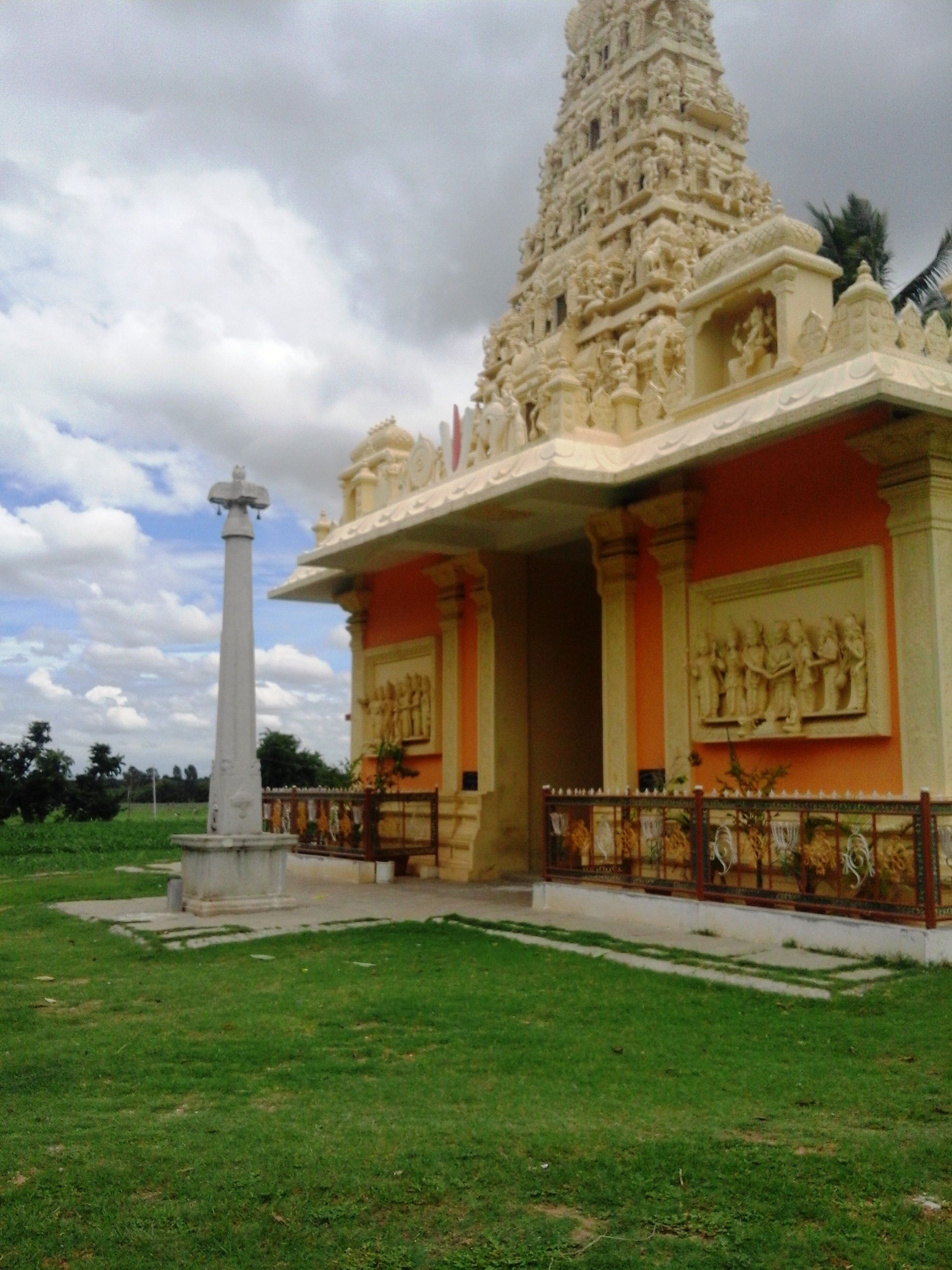
Sosale Devasthane

Sosale is a small village near T.Narsipur in the Mysore district of Karnataka province in India.

== Location ==
Sosale is located on the left bank of the Cauvery River near its confluence with the Kabini River.

== Administration ==
Sosale is under the jurisdiction of T.Narsipur Taluk in Mysore district, Karnataka State, India. It is the main village of Sosale hobli, a cluster of villages that includes Musuvinakoppalu.

== Image gallery ==
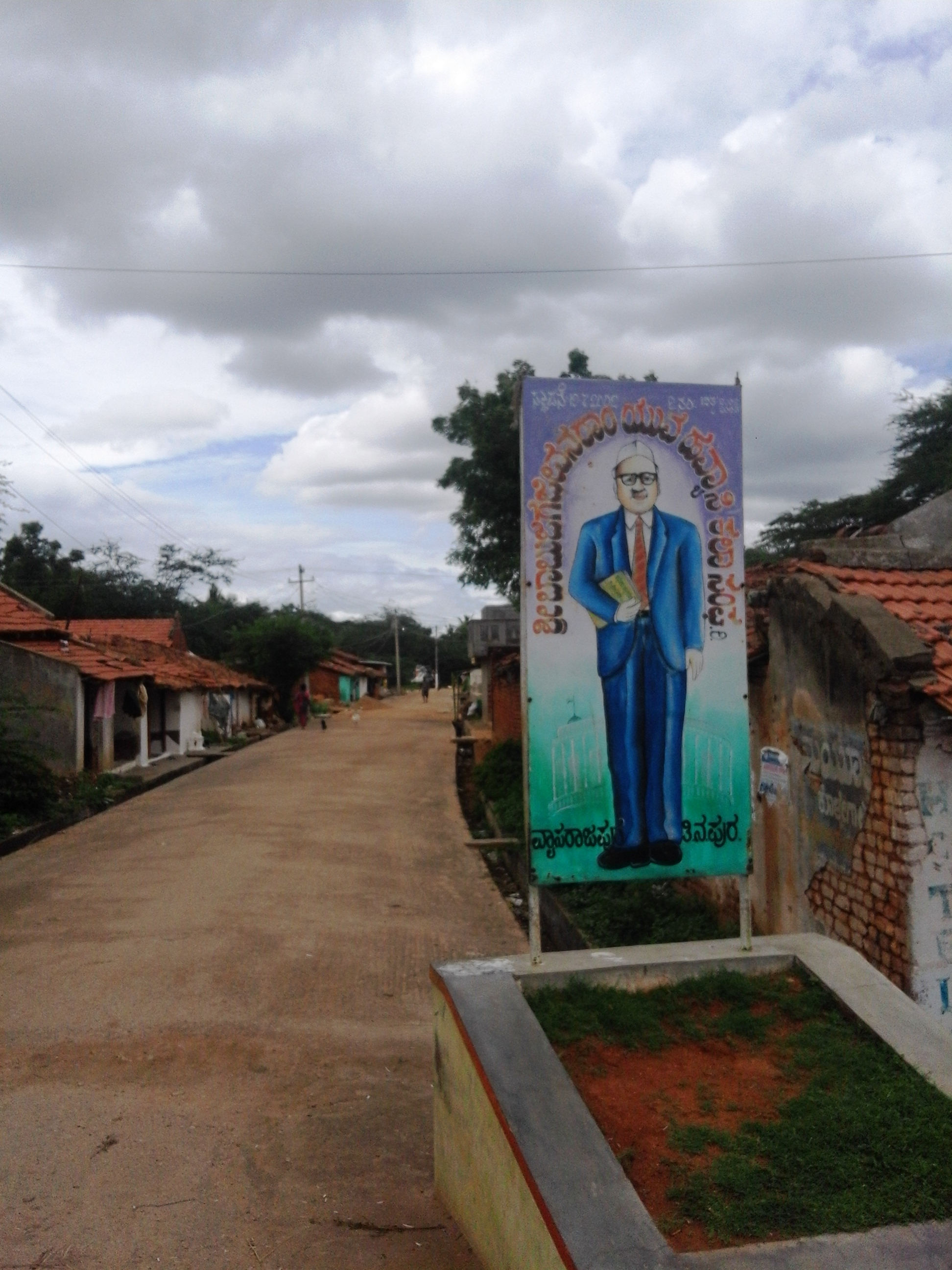
Kebbe village

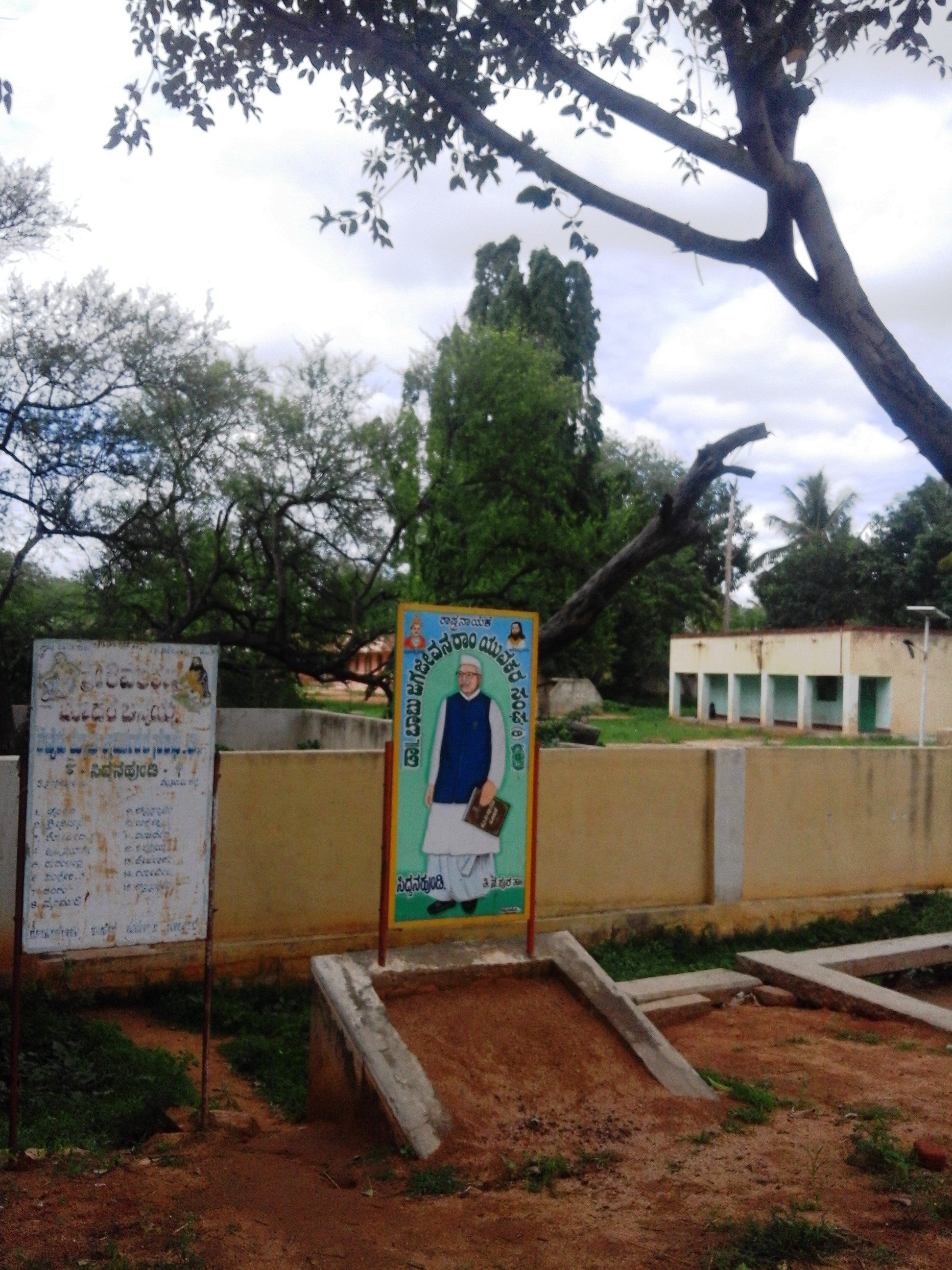
Siddana Hundi
