= Ramdas Kathiababa =

Eighteenth-century Hindu religious leader, Nimbarka saint, philosopher

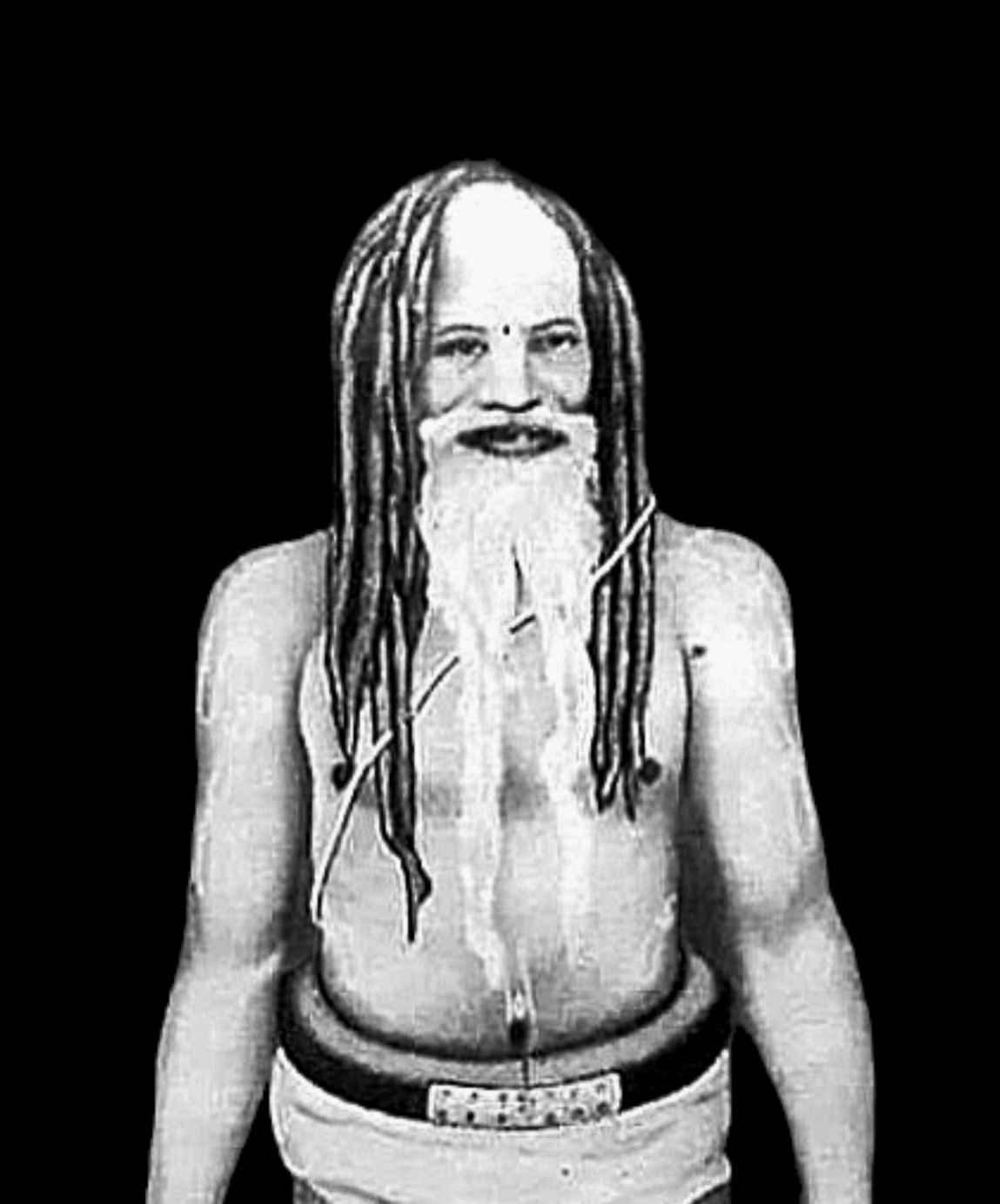
- Ramdas Kathiababa in Vrindavan
- Succeeded by: Santadas Kathiababa
- Title: Kathia Baba Maharaj

Personal life
- Born: 24 July 1800 Punjab state, India
- Died: 8 February 1909 (aged 108) Vrindavan, India

Religious life
- Religion: Hinduism
- Philosophy: Nimbarka Sampradaya

Religious career
- Teacher: Devdasji Maharaja

Ramdas Kathiababa (Bengali: রামদাস কাঠিয়াবাবা; IAST: Rāmadās kāṭhiābābā; 24 July 1800 – 8 February 1909) was a Hindu Spiritual leader of the Dvaitadvaita Nimbarka Sampradaya the 54th Acharya of the Nimbarka Sampradaya Sri Sri 108 Swami Ramdas Kathia Babaji Maharaj was known everywhere as Kathia Baba. He was born about two hundred years ago in the village of Lonachamari in the state of Punjab.

== Religious practice ==
At the age of four, a Paramahamsa devotee of the village advised him to always chant the name of Rama. From that time on, he started chanting the name of Ram. When he was 5/6 years old, once while grazing buffaloes in the field, he got the vision of a bright and pious man. When Sadhuji asked him for some food, Kathia Babaji Maharaj brought him a large quantity of flour, sugar, ghee, etc. from his house. The saint was pleased and gave him the gift, "You will be the yogi king." With this gift, the saint disappeared. At that time Kathia Babaji Maharaj felt as if all his attachment to the world was gone. Then, when Upanayan was reformed, he began to study the scriptures with the Guru in another village. There he studied grammar, astrology, scriptures, memory, Vishnu Sahasranama, Srimadbhagavad Gita etc. Of all these texts, Bhagavata Purana was his favorite. Returning from the Gurugriha, he sat under a banyan tree in the village and chanted the Gayatri mantra to attain Siddhi, and at last he attained Siddhi in Gayatri. Goddess Gayatri appeared and succeeded in seeing him. While chanting the Gayatri Mantra, he was instructed to complete the last twenty-five thousand chants by fire.

== Kathia Baba ==
Kathia Baba is a Contemporary group named after the founder who follow the philosophy of Dvaitādvaita Vaishnava Vedanta of Nimbarka.

== See also ==
- Nimbarkacharya
- Nimbarka Sampradaya
