= Ahobila Matha =

Hindu monastery in Andhra Pradesh, India

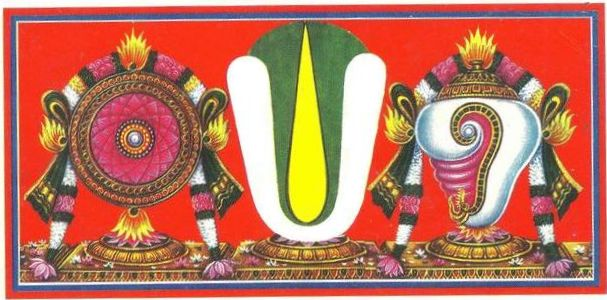
The Vadakalai urdhva pundra, the emblem of the Sri Vaishnava tradition

The Ahobila Matha is a Hindu monastery located at Ahobilam in Andhra Pradesh, India, following the Vadakalai—Sri Vaishnava tradition of Vedanta Desika. It was founded by Adivan Satakopa Jiyar in the early 1400s.

== History ==
Adivan Satakopa Jiyar, a Vadakalai saint and disciple of Ghatikasatham Ammal, established the matha in line with the Pancharatra tradition. Ammal himself was the successor of the noted Sri Vaishnava teacher, Nadadoor Ammal. The founder is also regarded in some accounts as the direct preceptor of the 74 simhasanadhipatis (heads of the Narasimha monastery) originally instituted by Ramanuja. The matha has a practice of doing sanchara's regularly to spread srivaishnava tradition instead of staying at a single place.

The Matha became influential in Vijayanagara empire, the jiyar was praised in Amuktamalyada as reincarnation of Ramanuja. Shashta Parankusha Swamy, the 6th Jiyar of the matha was influential in the Kalinga royal Politics of that era. During Talikota, when the deccan sultans defeated Vijayanagara, The matha's pontiffs moved their primary place to Tirumala, Thiruvallur and then Kanchi over 100 years as the Golconda Sultanate occupied Ahobilam and looted it presenting its vast jewel collection and Utsava Murtis to Golconda Sultan of Adil Shahi Dynasty, Ahobilam was reconqured and then after a few decades Muslims re-occupied Ahobilam. When Kanchi too fell in 1600s to Muslims (during the reign of the 15th Jiyar of Ahobila Matha), the matha evacuated Kanchi and then moved to Padur and then Narasimhapuram near Kumbhakonam receiving Patronage of Thanjavur Marathas like Serfoji Bhonsle in early 1800s. Many Mahants from north India came and became sishyas of Ahobila Acharyas and they established Uttara Ahobila Mathas in Baroda, Ujjain, Rajasthan, Puri, Mathura and Bihar from 1700s to mid 1900s. The matha's social and political importance was recognized by the government of Madras presidency. The 42nd Jiyar of the Matha established Veda Pathashalas, Agama Pathashalas, Oriental schools around South India and a Sanskrit college in Maduranthakam. The 44th Jiyar of the Matha proposed and constructed Srirangam's rajagopura which was left unfinished for centuries.

The present pontiff is the 46th Jiyar, Srivan Satakopa Sri Ranganatha Yateendra Mahadesikan, who succeeded the 45th jiyar, Sri Lakshmi Nrsimha Divya Paduka Sevaka Srivan Satakopa Sri Narayana Yateendra Mahadesikan, after his passing in May 2013.

== Legend ==
According to legend, Malola Narasimha, one of the nine forms of Narasimha at Ahobilam, leapt into the hands of Adivan Satakopa Jiyar, and commanded him to travel across the length and breadth of India. As a result, the matha came to hold authority over the Nava Narasimha temples of Ahobilam—the Matha and Temple being recognized as a single entity as the Utsava Vigrahas are also a part of Aradhya Vigrahas of the Matha's pontiffs. Ahobilam's Ugra Stambha is the birth place of the Hindu deity Narasimha, where he emerged from a pillar to kill the Asura hiranyakashyapu.

== Literary contributions ==
The pontiffs of the matha are known for writing numerous works:

Adivan Satakopa Jiyar instructed his disciple Narayana Muni (later the 2nd pontiff) to compose more than sixty works. Narayana Muni’s writings include Yajussandhyavandana Bhashya, Rahasya-traya Jīvātu, Rahasya-trayārtha-vicāra, Puruṣārtha Sudhānidhi, Nyāsa-viṃśati Vyākhyāna, Stotra-ratna Bhāṣya, and Tattva-traya. These works became firmly established in the Vadakalai tradition.

Another disciple, Toḻappar, wrote the Daśa Nirṇayī, a treatise on Sri Vaishnava religious practices, earning him the title Vaidika Sarvabhauma from his teacher.

The 6th jiyar authored texts detailing Bharanyasa Vidhi and served as acharya for Panchamatabanjanam tatacharya who became the royal preceptor of Vijayanagara samrajya.

The 7th jiyar authored the Vasāntikā-pariṇaya, a drama describing the divine wedding of the deity of Ahobilam with Chenchu Lakshmi. This work provides early references to the origins of the matha and its royal patronage.

The 14th jiyar is known for his works such as the īśāvāsyopaniṣad bhāṣya, māṇḍūkyopaniṣad bhāṣya, bhagavadgītārthasaṃgraha vibhāga, aṣṭaślokī bhāṣya, jijñāsasūtrabhāṣya-bhāvaprakāśikā, and puruṣakāramīmāṃsā, which aimed at expounding the tenets of Ramanuja and Vedanta Desika.

The 24th jiyar wrote works such as śrīstava and śrīpañcāśat, establishing the supremacy of Lakshmi according to the Vadakalai tradition.

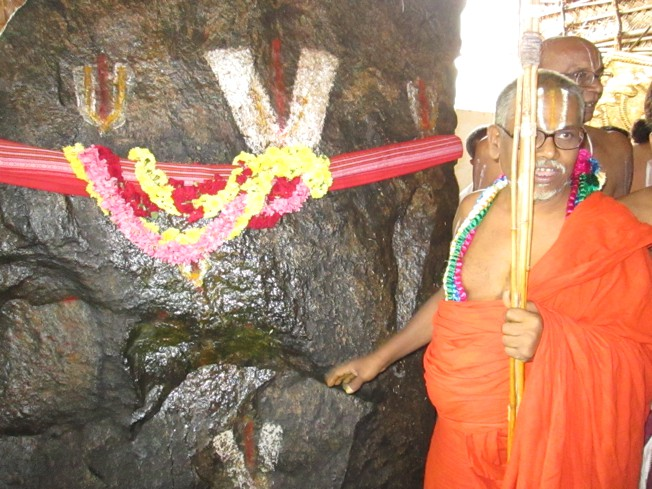
The 46th jiyar, Srivan Satakopa Sri Ranganatha Yateendra Mahadesikan

== Temples administered ==
Several temples such as the Nava (nine) Narasimha temples and Prahlada Varada Temple of Ahobilam, Veeraraghava temple in Tiruvallur and Valvil Rama temple, Aandalakkum Ayyan temple in the outskirts of Kumbakonam (Pullaboothankudi), the Sri Vedanta Desikan sannidhi inside the premises of the Srirangam Temple, Sri Dasavathara sannidhi established by Tirumangai Alvar in Kollidaikarai Srirangam, and the Sri Nava Narasimha Temple in Naimisharanya, are administered by Ahobila Matha. Many smaller Temples around Vandavasi like Sohattur, Injimedu and Mukkur, Temples around Hosur and Paruthipattu Perumal temples are also Administered by Ahobila Matha.

The matha also has several branches across India. These branches include, Kadappa, Tirumala, Tirupati, Thiruvallur, Sriperumbudur, Kanchipuram, Triplicane-Mylapore-Mambalam-Nanganallur and Selaiyur in Chennai, Maduranthakam, Padur, Thiruvaheendrapuram, Nangur, Indhalur, UppiliappanKoil, Kumbakonam, Nrisimharajapuram, Kalyanapuram, Srirangam, Vaduvur, Mannargudi, Madurai, Srivilliputhur, Thiruppullani, Azhwar Thirunagari, Thirukkurungudi, Thiruvananthapuram, Salem, Bangalore, Melukote, Mysore, Hyderabad, Bhadrachalam, Nagpur, Pune, Mumbai, Naimisharanya and New Delhi. Many Affiliated Uttara Ahobila Matha institutions exists across North India. The matha emphasises Narasimha devotion, and formal initiation involves the ritual surrender of the ātman to Malola Narasimha.

== Institutions administered ==
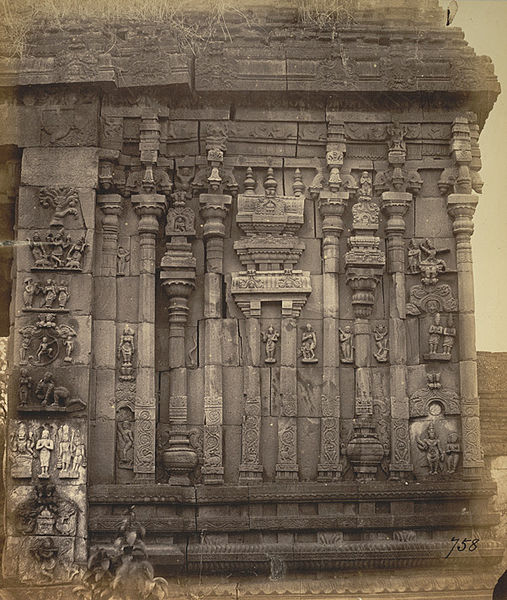
Narasimha temple, Ahobilam (Photo taken in 1875).

The Ahobila Matha has several religious and educational institutions in India, which are:

1. Sri Ahobila Matha Sanskrit College (Est. 1942)
2. Sri Ahobila Matha Veda Patashala (Est. 1942) (Many locations like Selaiyur, Thiruvallur, Maduranthakam and Ahobilam)
3. Sri Ahobila Matha Oriental Higher Secondary School (Est. 1952)
4. Sri Ahobila Matha Center for Human Resource Development (Est. 2002)
5. Sri Malolan College of Arts and Science, Madurantakam, (Est. 2009)

== See also ==
- Sri Vaishnavism
- Ramanuja
