= Gita Bhashya =

Commentary of Bhagavad Gita by Ramanuja

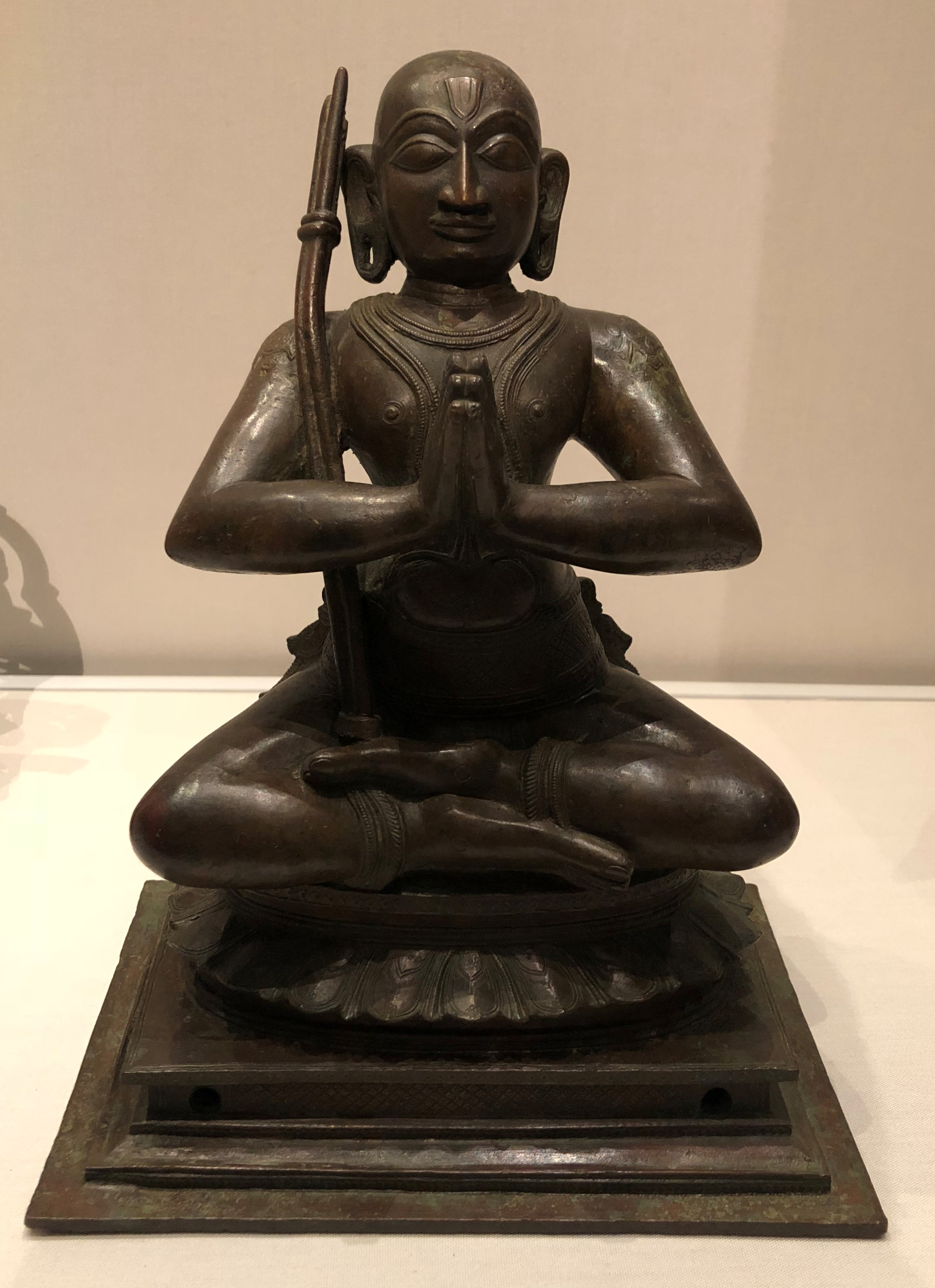
- Bronze statue of Ramanuja, 15th century.

Information
- Religion: Hinduism
- Author: Ramanuja
- Language: Sanskrit
- Chapters: 18

The Gita Bhashya (Sanskrit: गीताभाष्य, romanized: Gītābhāṣya), also rendered the Bhagavad Gita Bhashya, is a commentary or treatise of the Bhagavad Gita by the Hindu philosopher Ramanuja.

The work asserts Vishnu to be the parat-tattva (supreme truth), and details the processes of bhakti yoga, karma yoga, and jnana yoga for the achievement of moksha (spiritual liberation). It also explores the concepts of the avataras of Vishnu and the practice of prapatti (self-surrender).

== Content ==
The Gita Bhashya comprises eighteen chapters that are divided into three sections; each section comprises a hexad (six chapters), following the structure of Yamunacharya's Gitarthasangraha, a 32 verse summary of Bhagavad Gita. Ramanuja also follows Yamunacharya's terminology and ideas in his commentary.

=== First hexad ===
The first six chapters of the work offer an exposition of an approach to self-realisation of the individual self. Ramanuja describes his process as sequential, beginning with the cognisance of the nature of the self, followed by cognisance of the concept of karma yoga, and finally the cognisance of the concept of jnana yoga. The commentary describes Krishna urging Arjuna to perform his duty on the battlefield. The work exposits that Arjuna's hesitation and desire to abstain from his duty as a warrior emerge from the incorrect notion that a person is their prakrti (body), and the interpretation of death as the end of being. The truth, which is the knowledge that one is essentially the Atman (self), which Ramanuja also terms Brahman, is regarded to resolve this dilemma. Adidevananda explains that Ramanuja uses the term Brahman for the individual self because of its unlimited nature in liberation, and that the individual self remains distinct from the Supreme Being even in liberation.

=== Second hexad ===
The second hexad is centered around the concept of bhakti yoga. Bhakti (devotion to God), is defined as the flow of consciousness to Narayana (Vishnu). This is described to be achieved by devotion to Vishnu in the Atman (sense of self), which then manifests in the jiva (life force). Vishnu is described as the Supreme Being in this hexad, stated to be the source, upholder, as well as the destroyer of the cosmos, which is itself regarded to be his body. The author offers an interpretation of the mahavakya tat tvam asi (thou art that) as the Śarīra-Śarīrī (body-soul) relationship between Ishvara and his two natures, jiva and ajiva (animate and inanimate matter). Sincere devotion to God is described to be the only prerequisite for the purposes of worship. The vishvarupa (cosmic form) of Krishna, the distinction between the concepts of moksha and kaivalya, and the paratva (transcedance) and the saulabhya (accessibility) of God are each offered a discourse.

Ramanuja offers a critique of the Advaita philosophy in favour of Vishishtadvaita, reproving the rejection of the difference that the proponents of the former made between God and jiva, and between jivas.

Ramanuja equates upasana with bhakti and describes overcoming maya through taking refuge in Krishna before beginning bhakti. This interpretation presupposes prapatti as a step before bhakti.

=== Third hexad ===
The third hexad further examines the concepts of Prakrti, Atman, and the Supreme Being, the binding of the qualities of Prakrti to Atman, and prapatti (self-surrender) to Vishnu as the path to salvation. The author explores the notion of abandoning dharma and expiatory practices and seeking refuge in God alone.

=== Prapatti ===
Ramanuja uses three terms for seeking refuge in God in the Gita Bhashya: prapatti, saranagati, and samasrayana. Srilata Raman notes that prapatti and saranagati are used interchangeably to describe seeking refuge in Krishna, and samasrayana is "restricted particularly for the accessible manifestation, like a human descent of the God". In his commentary on Bhagavad Gita verse 7.19, Ramanuja describes the surrender of the jnani (one with wisdom) as involving knowledge of the self's subordinate relationship to God and contemplation of Krishna as both the means and goal of liberation. Srilata Raman calls this form of surrender jnana-prapatti, which is characterized by knowledge and contemplation and identified with bhakti yoga, and distinguishes it from the surrender of devotees seeking purification from the effects of prakriti and accumulated sins before beginning bhakti yoga.

== See also ==
- Sri Bhashya
- Vedarthasamgraha

== Sources ==
- Raman, Srilata (2007). Self-Surrender (prapatti) to God in Shrivaishnavism: Tamil Cats or Sanskrit Monkeys?. Routledge. ISBN 978-1-134-16537-7.
- Adidevananda (2009). GITA RAMANUJA GITA BHASYA Devanagari And English Rendering By Swami Adidevananda Sri Rama Krishna Math.
