= Siddhitraya =

Sanskrit philosophical treatise

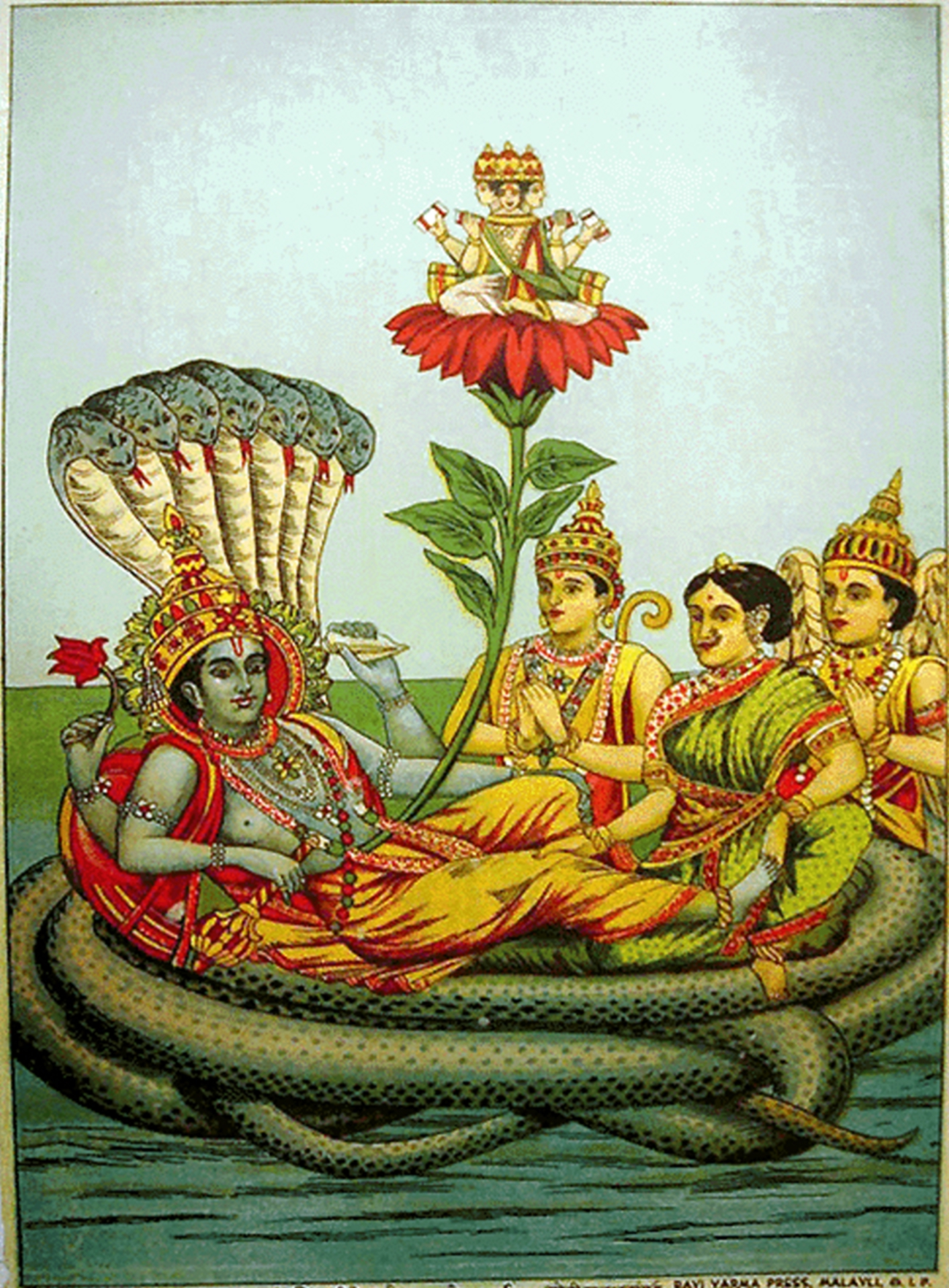
- Painting of Vishnu, regarded to be the Supreme Being in this work, accompanied by his consort, Lakshmi. Ravi Varma Press, Malavli.

Information
- Religion: Hinduism
- Author: Yamunacharya
- Language: Sanskrit

The Siddhitraya (Sanskrit: सिद्धित्रयम्, romanized: Siddhitrayam) is a Sanskrit treatise written in the 10th century by the Hindu philosopher Yamunacharya. Regarded to be the largest and the most prominent work of Yamunacharya, the Siddhitraya was an important foundational text for the philosophy of Vishishtadvaita. It offers refutations of the philosophical positions of Advaita and other Hindu schools.

The work consists of three sections, expounding the author's positions on the "three demonstrations": the concepts of ātmasiddhi (demonstration of individual self), īśvarasiddhi (demonstration of God), and saṁvitsiddhi (demonstration of reality in the empirical world). All three sections of the work are regarded to be incomplete.

== Content ==
=== Ātmasiddhi ===
The ātmasiddhi is the largest of the three sections of the text and consists of passages both in the form of verse and prose. In the invocatory verse, emphasis is placed on bhakti (devotion) to the Supreme Being (Vishnu), who is described to be the sovereign of the universe, time, and all souls, and is said to always be associated with Sri, his consort. The author sets forth to discuss the real nature of Ātman, the concept of Self. He argues that the Ātman enjoys an independent existence from the body, and is also distinct from the senses, the mind, and the intellect. The Ātman is also described to be eternal, self-luminous, as well as possessing a form of consciousness that is omnipresent. The author describes the varying positions regarding the Ātman and the Supreme Being, concerning their form, their nature of existence, mutual relationship, the liberation of the Ātman and the means of liberation. He offers refutations of the positions of philosophers such as Bhartrhari, Adi Shankara, and Bhaskara, citing fallacies and scriptural statements.

=== Īśvarasiddhi ===
The īśvarasiddhi attempts to establish the existence of the Supreme Being, who is described to be the sovereign of the universe. Yamunacharya contends the views of the Mimamsa school of philosophy and offers arguments against its position, which opposes the existence of a Supreme Being as well the omniscience and omnipotence of the concept. He also offers an appraisal of the views of the Nyaya school.

=== Saṃvitsiddhi ===
The saṁvitsiddhi is a treatise on ontology and offers the author's refutations against the Advaitic positions of the concepts of Brahman (Ultimate Reality), maya (illusion), and avidya (ignorance) in its interpretation of the Upanishads. Some sections of the treatise also refute the Buddhist conception of saṁvit (consciousness).

== See also ==
- Vedarthasamgaraha
- Stotra Ratna
- Chatuh Shloki
