= Bhrama (Hinduism) =

Hindu philosophical concept

Bhrama (Sanskrit: भ्रम), in the context of Hindu thought, means – error, mistake, illusion, confusion, perplexity. But, it literally means – that which is not steady; and refers to error etc., caused by defects in the perceptive system. The seeing of snake in a rope in darkness, silver nacre in moonlight, water in a mirage on a hot day and a person in a stump of tree are four classic instances quoted in Vedantic texts. Bhrama is a mistake, it is a confusion about one object which exists for another object which does not exist, it merely refers to the fallibility of human perception.

Human nature is ordinarily afflicted by - भ्रमप्रमादविप्रलिप्साकरणापाटवदोषाः – i.e. bhrama (false knowledge or mistakes), pramāda (inattention or misunderstanding reality), vipralipsā (cheating propensity) and karaṇa-a-pāṭava (imperfection of the senses) are four major mind-faults which mislead human beings and do not permit right perception and cognition. Amongst these, the knowledge which is of the nature of bhrama is the direct thought-wave of avidya. And, the texts speak about there being five theories of illusion or erroneous perception – Ātmakhyāti (Yogacara theory of subjective apprehension), Asatkhyāti (Madhyamaka theory of the nonexistent), Akhyāti (Prabhākara’s theory of non-apprehension), Anyathākhyati (Nyaya theory of misapprehension) and Anirvacanīyakhyāti (Advaita Vedanta theory of apprehension of the indeterminate), developed by five schools of thought.

The Vedantic texts reveal the Self as Pure Consciousness; they reveal the Self as the ever blissful witness who is neither the enjoyer nor the enjoyment or the object of enjoyment. The enjoyer is Chidabhasa or Jiva, the sheath of the intellect, a product or manifestation of Maya, not transcendentally real and subject to change. Vidyaranya in his Panchadasi (VII.9-10) explains:

अधिष्ठानांशसंयुक्तं भ्रमाशमवलम्बते |
यदा तदाऽहं संसारीत्येवं जीवोऽभिमन्यते ||

When Jiva, having the immutable Kutastha as his basis, wrongly identifies himself with the gross and subtle bodies, he comes to think of himself as bound by the pleasures and pains of this world.

भ्रमांश्स्य तिरस्कारदधिष्ठानप्रधानता |
यदा तदा चिदात्माहामसङ्गोऽस्मीति बुद्धयते ||

When Jiva gives up his attachment to his illusory portion, the nature of the substratum becomes predominant and he realizes that he is associationless and of the nature of pure consciousness.

Swami Swahananda in his commentary tells us that Kutastha, conventionally identified with ego, is not the object of identification for it is incapable of being associated with ego.

According to Shankara, atma-anatma adhyasa, the so-called locus of superimposition, is a mispresentation or proksha-aproksha bhrama. Panchapadika of Padmapada interprets purovasthitava (the object in front) as contact with the visual sense, whereas Ratnaprabha of Niścalakara relates it with sense-contact; the former explains that a non-object can become an apparent object and the latter explains that Shankara in no way considers the said locus to be complete and conclusive.

Saguna (with attributes) worship leads to a typical illusion in as much as the devotee mistakes physical or mental images for the formless God; it is of the nature of the Samvadi-bhrama that finally leads to the realization of Nirguna Brahman, the endless pursuit after sense-objects is the Visamvadi-bhrama. But, the cumulative subtle awareness of bhrama need not necessarily result in the awareness of Maya because owing to the latter either one wakes up from a dream or goes on dreaming forever.

Svarūpa-bhrama (illusion about spirituality) is one of the four major anarthas (useless, meaningless, disastrous, wrongdoings) and is said to be of four kinds – sva-tattva which is illusion about one’s own spiritual identity, para-tattva which is illusion about the spiritual identity of the supreme absolute truth, sādhya-sādhana-tattva which is illusion about the spiritual means and the object gained, and māyā-tattva which is illusion about the Lord’s external energy. These anarthas are required to be uprooted in order to develop niśṭa (devotion). But, bhrama is not an āropa (imposing of, imputation, figurative substitution) which is an āhārya (wilfully caused in spite of falsity) cognition.

The Yoga School of thought adopts the Anyathākhyati theory of misapprehension of the Nyayas for dealing with bhrama, which theory is based on the premise that bhrama is thinking of something as that which it is not, like attributing the characteristics of Prakrti to Purusha and vice versa.

In Ayurveda, bhrama refers to Vertigo, a discreet disease due to Vata prakopa and Pitta prakopa which shows six distinct stages, and is curable.
