= Mahapurna =

Hindu preceptor of the Sri Vaishnava tradition

Mahapurna (Sanskrit: महापूर्ण, romanized: Mahāpūrṇa), also called Periyanambi, was one of the teachers and maternal uncle of the medieval Vaishnava philosopher Ramanuja. He was responsible for initiating Ramanuja into Sri Vaishnavism.

== Biography ==
Mahapurna was born in a Vaishnava family and lived in the eleventh or twelfth century CE. He was a disciple of Yamunacharya, whom he helped with the management of the Ranganathasamy temple at Srirangam.

He was instrumental in bringing Ramanuja into the Sri Vaishnava fold. According to tradition, Ramanuja is described to have heard the chanting of the Stotra Ratna of Yamunacharya by Mahapurna. He learned about Yamunacharya from Mahapurna, and travelled to Srirangam to meet him. Mahapurna initiated Ramanuja with the performance the Pancha Samskara ceremony at Madurantakam, a place located 40 km from present day Chennai. Yamunacharya passed away before they met each other. Mahapurna is described to have been blinded under the orders of the Chola king [kirumikanda chola], who adhered to Shaivism.

== See also ==
- Nathamuni
- Kanchipurna
- Nanjiyar
