= Mohā =

Sanskrit word meaning delusion

Mohā (Sanskrit: मोहा), a Sanskrit word often rendered as “delusion", refers to the Hindu and Buddhist concept of ignorance that prevents the understanding of Truth. Bhagavad Gita, Verse 2.52, explains this delusion (moha) as infatuation or attachment to maya.

In Ayurvedic classics, hallucinations and delusions are referred to as false perceptions (mithyājñāna), illusions (maya), infatuations (moha), or confusion (bhrama).

In Yoga philosophy and Hatha Yoga Pradipika, moha is described as a delusion that clouds the mind. It has been cited as one of the causes of perjury. It is one of the Shadripurs.

== Literature ==
Moha appears in the Vedic literature, and has roots in early Vedic word mogha which means "empty, unreal, vain, useless, foolish". The term is used in theological literature such as the Manusmriti. According to the Vishnu Purana, moha means "foolishness" and represents a form of emotional spiritual pain. According to Vishnu Purana verses 6.5.1-6, "the wise man investigates the three types of worldly suffering, or mental and physical suffering and the like, and attains true knowledge and detachment from human objects, attaining ultimate extinction". According to the Saura Purana, moha refers to one of the five avidyas.

Bhagavad Gita verses 2.62-63 describe the process that leads to mental afflictions, including moha. It explains that attachment (sanga) to sensory objects leads to desire (kama). Unfulfilled desires lead to anger (krodha). Anger leads to delusion (moha), resulting in confusion (smriti-bhramsha). This further deteriorates into the loss of reason (buddhi-nasha), and eventually, the person is destroyed or falls into ignorance.

Moha refers to "confounding enemies" and, according to the Kakshaputatantra, represents one of several siddhis. According to the Kubjikamata-tantra, Moh is the third of the eight mothers born from the body of Vahni. These eight sub-manifestations, including delusion, symbolize mental dispositions or emotions and are considered obstacles to the attainment of liberated enlightenment. They were presided over by Unmatt Bhairav.

== See also ==
- Moh, closely related concept in Sikhism
- Moha (Buddhism)
- Upādāna, concept of clinging, loosely related to attachment
