= Sri Bhashya =

Hindu work of commentary

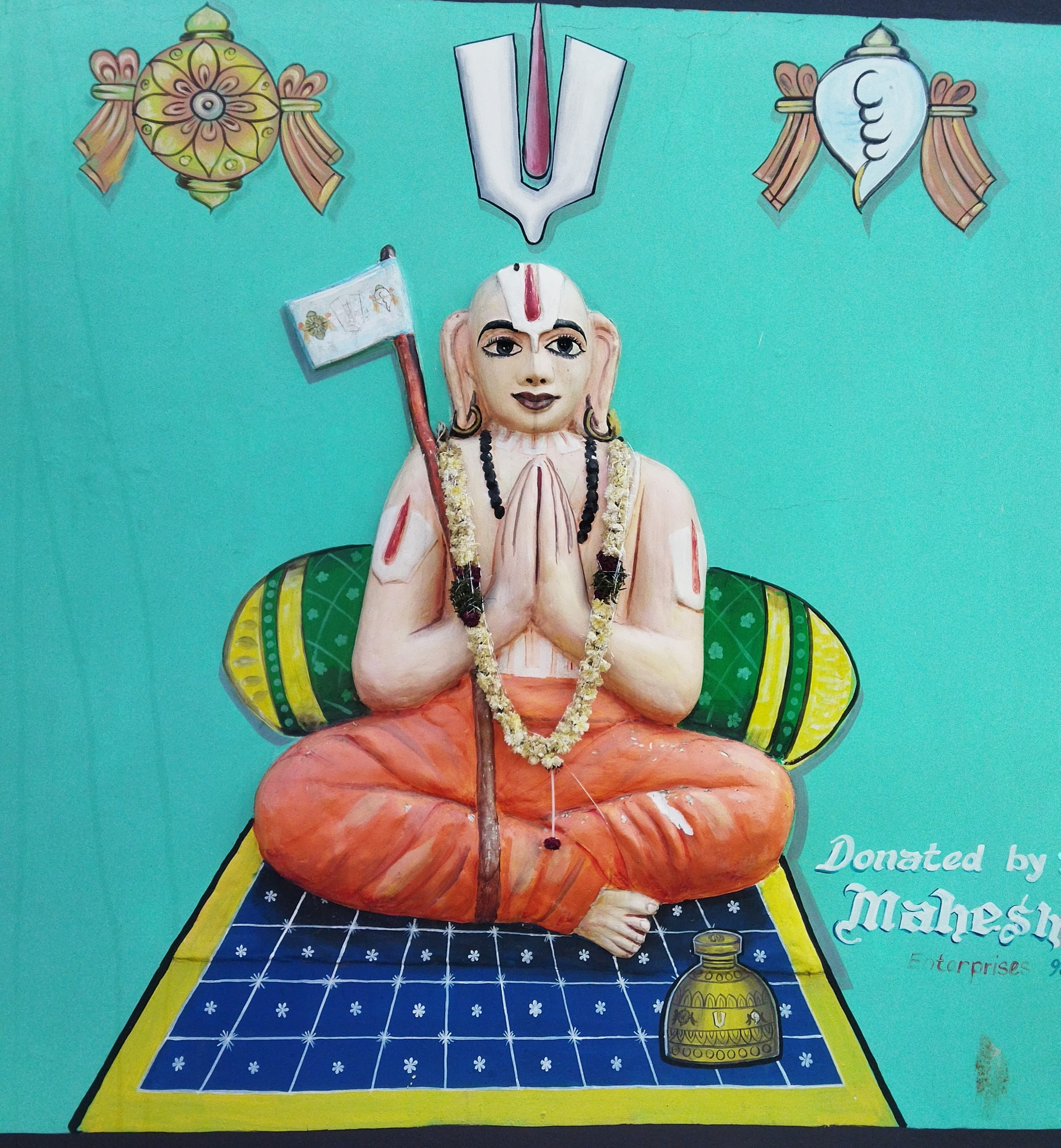
Portrayal of Ramanuja

The Sri Bhashya (Sanskrit: श्रीभाष्य, romanized: Śrībhāṣya) is the most famous work of the Brahmin philosopher Ramanuja (1017–1137). It is his commentary on Badarayana's Vedanta- or Brahma Sutra.

== Description ==
In his commentary, Ramanuja presents the fundamental philosophical principles of Vishishtadvaita based on his interpretation of the Upanishads, Bhagavad Gita and other Smriti texts, the previous acharyas, and the Vedanta-sutra itself. This is done by way of refuting Shankara's Advaita Vedanta and in particular his theory of maya/avidya. In this work, he describes the three categories of reality (tattvas): God, soul, and matter, which have been used by the later Vaishnava theologians such as Madhva. He explains the relationship between the body and the soul. The principles of bhakti as a means to liberation (moksha) were also developed. Ramanuja wrote the Vedanta-Dipa and Vedanta-Sara to aid in the overall understanding of the Sri Bhashya.

== Argument against Advaita ==
In Sri Bhashya 1.1.1, Ramanuja states and then refutes the Advaitic position that pure, undifferentiated consciousness, or Brahman, is the sole reality, equated with Being itself. In this view, the apparent plurality of the world is attributed to avidya (ignorance), a beginningless and inexplicable force that conceals Brahman's true nature and creates the illusion of distinction. Everything apart from Brahman, including acts of knowledge and objects, is deemed false and conceptual constructs. Ramanuja criticizes this view for invalidating ordinary experience.

== See also ==
- Gita Bhashya
- Narayana sukta
- Shatadushani
- Vedarthasamgraha

== Sources ==
- Hajime Nakamura and Trevor Leggett, A History of Early Vedānta Philosophy, Vol 2, New Delhi, Motilal Banarsidass (1983)
- Advaita Ashrama (2003). Brahma-Sutras According to Sri Ramanuja. ISBN 81-7505-006-3
