= Vedarthasamgraha =

Treatise by Hindu philosopher Ramanuja

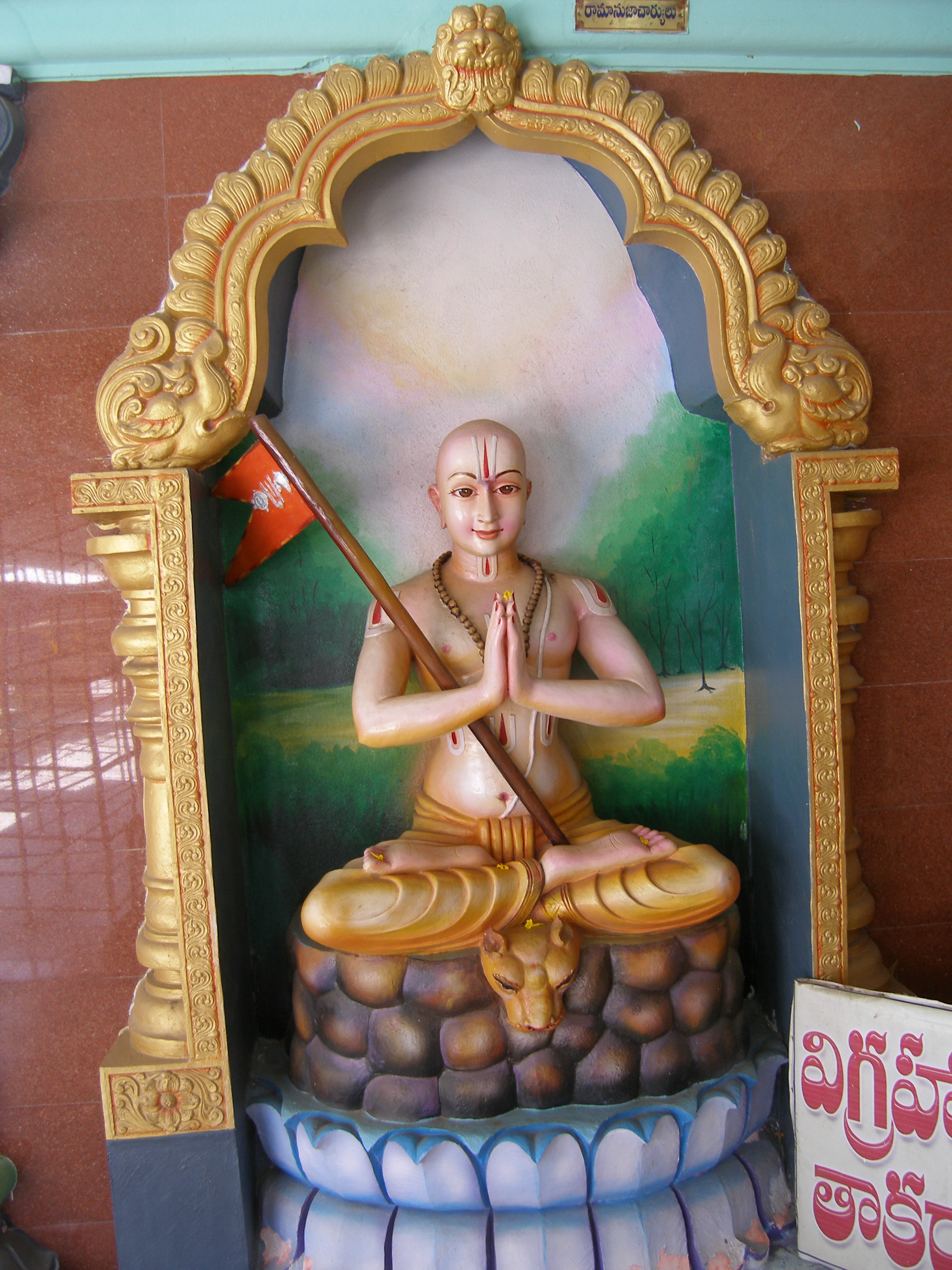
- Statue of Ramanuja, Tirumala.

Information
- Religion: Hinduism
- Author: Ramanuja
- Language: Sanskrit
- Verses: 252

The Vedarthasamgraha (Sanskrit: वेदार्थसंग्रह, romanized: Vedārthasaṃgraha), also rendered Vedarthasangraha, is a treatise by the Hindu philosopher Ramanuja, comprising his exegesis of a number of Upanishadic texts. The first of his three major works, Ramanuja propounds the doctrine of the Vishishtadvaita philosophy in this work and offers a discourse on the concepts of Brahman, bhakti, and moksha in Vedanta philosophy.

== Etymology ==
Vedarthasamgraha literally means "summary of the meaning of the Vedas" in Sanskrit.

== Content ==
The Vedarthasamgraha begins with the exaltation of Vishnu

=== Criticism of Advaita ===
The work is noteworthy for its criticism of Adi Shankara's Advaita philosophy. He offers a number of arguments to oppose the postulations of Advaita:

- Ramanuja argues that since Advaita claims that all is mithya (illusory), there is nothing that is required to be known. He regards this to be incompatible with the Advaita notion that all things are known with the knowledge of Brahman; either the Brahman and its effect are both real or both unreal. Instead, he supports the ontology of Vishishtadvaita, which claims that everything in the world possesses Brahman as the central aspect of its self, making these two statements compatible.
- He offers scriptural evidence from Shruti texts that Brahman possesses attributes such as knowledge rather than being a force of pure consciousness, rejecting the non-dualism of Advaita in favour of the qualified non-dualism of Vishishtadvaita.
- He opposes the notion that the nature of Brahman is clouded by avidya (ignorance), positing that avidya as a concept would not be able to explain its illusory nature on its own; if avidya were real, the non-duality of the philosophy would no longer stand true. He uses the same argument to oppose the notion that avidya is eliminated with the knowledge of Brahman (nivritti anupapatti) or knowledge obtained from Vedanta (nivartaka anupapatti).
- He attempts to refute the notion of a single Jiva (life force), called eka jiva vada, arguing that since Advaitins hold that the individual self and all bodies as distinct from Brahman are illusory, the existence of a single Jiva would also be illusory.
- He challenges the idea that knowledge of unity allows one to realise that Brahman alone is real, which dispels all illusion. He posits that since the Shruti texts are by definition illusory according to Advaita, as avidya themselves, they would be incapable of dispelling avidya.

=== Criticism of Bhedabheda ===
Ramanuja also offers a critique of the school of Bhaskara called Bhedabheda. He contests the idea that Brahman assumes the form of many Jivas due to upadhis (limitations), reasoning that the faults caused by the upadhis contradict the flawless nature of Brahman as described by the scriptures. He also opposes the belief that the essential nature of Brahman's svarupa (essence) evolves into achetana (non-sentient objects), which conflicts with the unchanging nature of Brahman. He also opposes the Bhedabheda school of Yadavaprakasa, one of his teachers, which posited that the individual self and Brahman are both really different and non-different, arguing that the very concept is inherently contradictory.

=== Treatise on Vishishtadvaita ===
The author propounds the principles and concepts underlying the philosophy of Vishishtadvaita in the latter half of the work. He begins with the ontological basis of the philosophy, called tattva, explaining the relationship between Brahman, Jiva, and Prakrti. He then explores upaya, the means of achieving Brahman through parabhakti (supreme devotion). He offers assertions for the validity of pramanas (sources of knowledge) and arguments for the belief that Narayana (Vishnu) is the Para Brahman (Supreme Reality). This is followed by a discourse that seeks to prove that Brahman is both the upadana karana (material cause) and nimitta karana (instrumental cause) of creation. He criticises the Mimamsa philosophy for its opposition to the Upanishads as a valid source of knowledge. He affirms the existence of Vaikuntha, the celestial abode of Vishnu, referred to as Nitya Vibhuti and Paramapada, on scriptural basis. In the final chapter of the work, he offers a recapitulation and his interpretation of the Vedas.

== See also ==
- Siddhitraya
- Sri Bhashya
- Gita Bhashya
