= Arishadvargas =

Enemies of the mind

In Hinduism, arishadvarga or shadripu (Sanskrit: षड्रिपु; meaning the six enemies) are the six enemies of the mind. These are kama (Desire/Lust), krodha (Anger), lobha (Greed), mada (Ego), moha (Attachment), and matsarya (Jealousy). In Hinduism, these 6 traits are considered negative characteristics that prevent humans from attaining moksha.

== Enemies of the mind ==
These are the fundamental tenets of Kali Yuga. The more each individual fights against them, the longer Dharma will endure in this yuga.

1. Lust or desire for sensual pleasure – काम (Kama)
2. Anger – क्रोध (Krodha)
3. Greed – लोभ (Lobha)
4. Want/desire – मोह (Moha)
5. Ego – मद (Mada)
6. Envy or Jealousy – मत्सर्य (Matsarya)

According to Hindu scriptures such as the Vedas, and Bhagavad Gita, these traits bind the soul to the cycle of birth and death and keep it confined in this material world (confines of Maya or relative existence). Especially, the first three are said to pave the way towards hell, while the first two bring about difficult experiences in our lives.

From the mada or ahankar, the false ego, all our actions in the world are for selfish ends. Hence there is no other factor causing the illusory duality of differentiation between 'us' and 'them' and the repeated pain and delusion it entails than the psychological ego-sense. When the materially identified ego has sided with the materialistic forces of creation (Maya), it is said to have the following faults: kama, krodha, lobha, moha, mada and matsarya. Also called evil passions, man's spiritual heritage constantly is looted by these internal thieves (and their numerous variations), causing him to lose knowledge of his True Being; it also creates hindrance to achieve Moksha.

If a person is virtually a prisoner of arishadvargas, then his life is completely governed by destiny. As a person moves ahead on the path of self-realisation, the grip of destiny over him loosens and he gets more and more leverage to change his destiny. When a person identifies himself with the Self, then he becomes part of the power of destiny. Merely his power of Sankalpa is good enough to materialize and change any situation, either for good or bad, according to his Sankalpa.

Doubt has positive and negative nature, this is the opposite of the nature of an object. According to Naiyayikas, knowledge is based on perception (anubhava), which is valid.

== Understanding ==
According to Hindu belief, without experiencing these Shadripus to the fullest, a person cannot understand the meaning of the Ānanda (Hindu philosophy), which is the soul. These enemies of the mind pull the human away from the soul from all sides and make life miserable. To overcome this misery, every human needs to experience all these Shadripus and understand the consequences that later teach the person the importance of love and divinity. A human who controls all these Shadripus, even to some degree, enjoys the power of peace.

A mind which is in delusion (moha) ignores its inner consciousness (Ātman). As a result, it starts believing that its ego is its only existence. Such an ego-dependent mind soon goes into a state of arrogance (mada), and personal desires (kama) start flourishing. As the mind fulfills some of its initial smaller desires, it desires more, becoming greedy (lobha). At some point, it eventually fails to fulfill some of its bigger desires, and then it gets angry (krodha). Finally, the mind starts envying (matsarya) others who have more than it has.

== See also ==
- Ahamkara – Sanskrit term in Indian philosophy
- Five Thieves – Major vices in Sikhism
- Kashaya (Jainism) – Passions which must be purged
- Kleshas – In Buddhism, mental states that cloud the mind
- Kleshas – Spiritual afflictions in Hinduism
