= Kanchipurna =

Hindu theologian

Kanchipurna was a twelfth century Vaishnavite acharya and one of the early teachers of Ramanuja. He is also known as Thirukachchi Nambigal.

== Life ==
When Ramanuja and his guru Yadava Prakaasa parted ways due to their differences in interpreting the Vedic literature, Ramanuja became a devotee of the Varadaraja Perumal temple in Kanchi. It was during his time here that he met Kanchipurna, a fellow devotee. Ramanuja met with Kanchipurna regularly and soon Ramanuja decided that he would become Kanchipurna's disciple. When he approached Kanchipurna about this, Kanchipurna politely refused as he did not belong to the same caste as Ramanuja and was lower in the social ladder when compared to Ramanuja. After this Kanchipurna left for Tirupati to worship Venkateswara, a form of Vishnu, and would return only after six months. According to Sri Vaishnava tradition, when he finally returned, it was through him that Varadaraja (Vishnu) conveyed his wish to Ramanuja. Accordingly, Kanchipurna advised Ramanuja that it was the deity's wish that he leave for Srirangam and find solace in Mahapurna, another Vaishnavite acharya.

== See also ==
- Mahapurna
- Parasara Bhattar
- Koorathalvar
