= Stotra Ratna =

Hindu work of literature

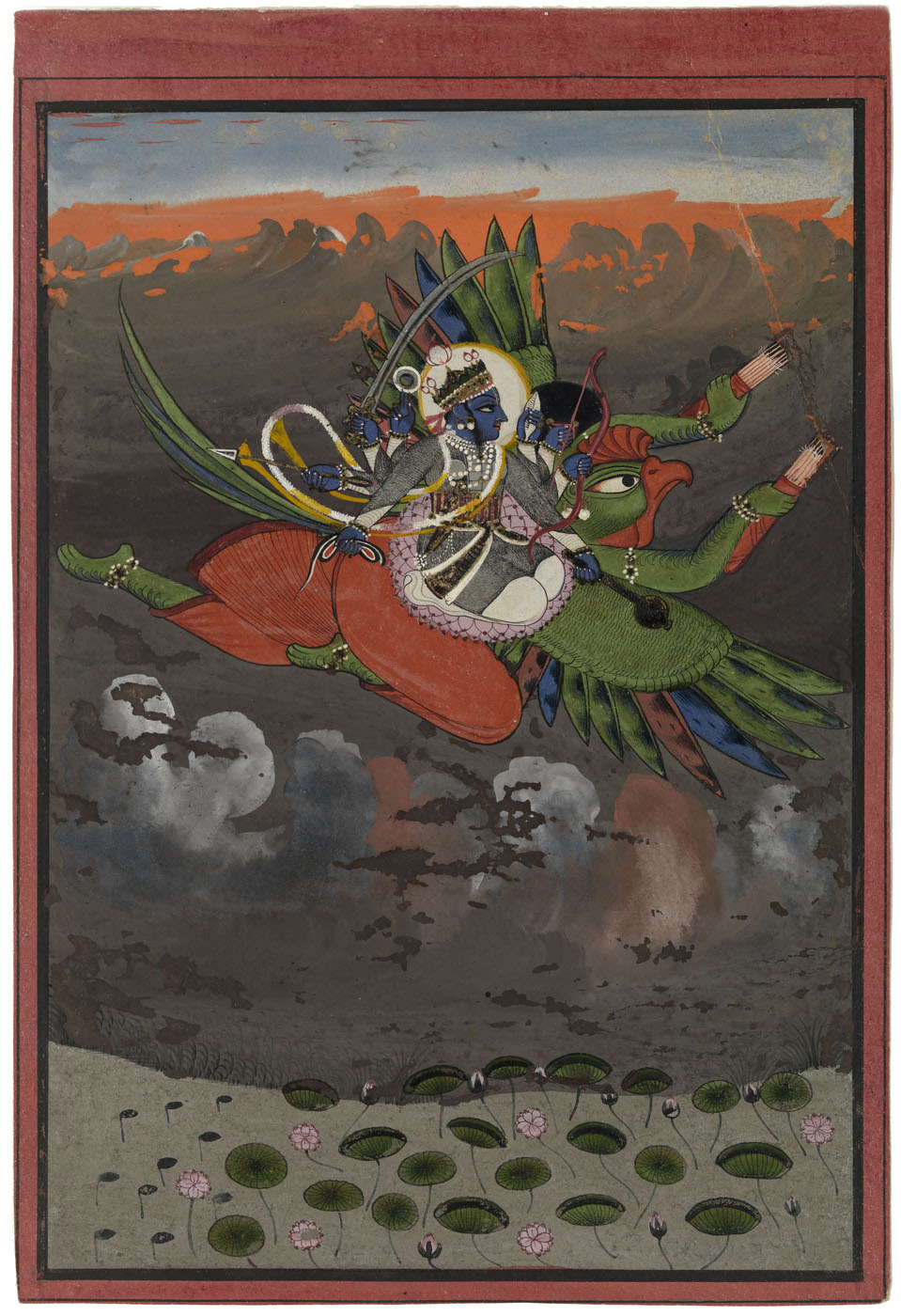
- Rajput painting of Vishnu upon Garuda.

Information
- Religion: Hinduism
- Author: Yamunacharya
- Language: Sanskrit
- Verses: 65

The Stotra Ratna (Sanskrit: स्तोत्ररत्नम्, romanized: Stotraratnam), also known as the Alavandarstotra, is a Sanskrit work of Hindu literature written by the Sri Vaishnava philosopher Yamunacharya. The hymn consists of sixty-five verses that praise the deity Vishnu. The work also includes teachings on Vishnu's nature and surrender (prapatti), a central doctrine of Vishistadvaita.

== Etymology ==
The title of the work consists of the Sanskrit terms stotra (hymn) and ratnam (jewel), therefore literally meaning, 'the jewel of hymns'.

== Description ==
The main theme of the Stotra Ratna is prapatti, the concept of total surrender to God. In the first few verses, the author pays tribute to his teachers. The opening verses honor Yamunacharya's grandfather Nathamuni, the sage Parashara, and Nammalvar, who is identified as "whose feet are adorned with vakula blossoms". The hymn describes Vishnu's supremacy (paratva) and accessibility (saulabhya), and as protector of his devotees.

Yamunacharya offers his surrender to Vishnu, indicating that even simple acts of service such as offering salutations are a form of his worship. The hymn also describes Vishnu as the "inner controller" of all beings, their natural friend, and who cares for their well-being. According to Vedanta Desika, the hymn also implies the meaning of the Dvaya mantra, a two-part mantra (Note: śrīmannārāyaṇacaraṇau śaraṇaṁ prapadye, śrīmate nārāyaṇāya namaḥ) in the Sri Vaishnava tradition.

He states that divine mercy is offered to all those who follow the path of prapatti, also describing it to be the only means of attaining salvation. The relief of the author in entrusting his burdens to Vishnu and seeking the forgiveness of the deity is also a theme of the work. The hymn describes Vishnu as the source of the power of Brahma and Shiva, and as the prime cause of the universe's creation, preservation, and destruction. Service to God (kainkarya) is described as a goal of devotion, with acts such as offering salutations and serving Vishnu and his devotees, and the devotee who seeks "permanent and unconditional servitude" to Vishnu is described as an "ekantin - one-pointed devotee". His consort, Lakshmi, is praised as the source of prosperity of the universe. The work is described to disseminate the central tenets of the philosophy of Vishishtadvaita. The hymn also describes Vaikuntha, the abode of Vishnu, and the author's desire to witness the cosmic form of the deity in this realm. In the closing verse, Yamunacharya asks Vishnu to look upon him kindly despite his wrongdoings, citing his relationship with his grandfather, the saint Nathamuni.

Yamunacharya is regarded to have been influenced by the hymns of the poet-saints called the Alvars, and he pays homage to Nammalvar at the outset of this work.

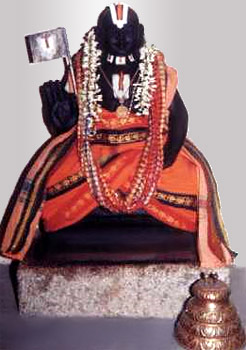
Murti of Yamunacharya.

== Hymns ==
The ninth hymn of this work glorifies the attributes of Vishnu:

kah srih sriyah parama-sattva-samasrayah kah
kah pundarika-nayanah purushottamah kah
kasyaytutayuta-sataika-kalamsakamse
visvam vicitra-cid-acit-pravibhaga-vrittam

Who is the splendor of the goddess of fortune? Who is the shelter of the pure devotees? Who has handsome lotus-eyes? Who is the Supreme Person? In a fraction of a fraction of a hundred-million-millionth part of whom is this world, filled with wonderful spiritual and material variety, manifested?

— Stotra Ratna, Verse 9

The thirty-eighth hymn of the work mentions Garuda, the vahana (mount) of the deity:

dasah sakha vahanam asanam dhvajo
yas te vitanam vyajanam trayimayah
upasthitam tena puro garutmata
tvad-anghri-sammarda-kinanka-sobhina

O Lord before whom stands Garuda, who bears Your splendid footprints, and who is Your servant, friend, carrier, throne, flag, canopy, fan, and three Vedas

— Stotra Ratna, Verse 38

== See also ==
- Chatuh Shloki
- Siddhitraya
- Dayashataka

== Sources ==
- Narasimhachary (1998). Narasimhachary, M. Contribution Of Yāmunācārya To Viśiṣṭādvaita.
