= Mada =

Demon in Hindu mythology

Mada (Sanskrit: मद) is a term used in both Hindu theology and mythology. It is one of the Arishadvargas. It refers to one of the six enemies of the mind or a vice according to the Hindu scriptures.

== Etymology ==
Mada has various meanings such as exaltation, inspiration, intoxication, insanity, and drukness, along with its cognate madness. Negligence, intoxication, and hubris are nuanced forms of madness per the Indic understanding.

== As an obstacle to moksha ==
According to the Hindu theology, mada signifies negative attributes such as "arrogance, excessive pride, obstinacy, stubborn mindedness". It is seen as a major obstacle to attaining moksha, or salvation. If one bears mada towards another person, they cannot attain moksha. The presence of Mada in a person leads to ignorance which in turn leads to the corruption of the mind. According to Hindu scriptures, mada is often manifested due to a variety of reasons.

== As a personified form ==
In the Mahabharata, mada is madness, personified as an asura (demon). He is also categorized as a krtya, the product of sorcery. He is described as a massive being who can swallow the entire cosmos. He is called upon by sage Chyavana at the time when the Treta and Dvapara yugas meet. Mada's form is compared to Krishna's visvarupa at the climax of the Bhagavad Gita.

In return for the Asvinidevas restoring sage Cyavana's eyesight, Cyavana asked what they wanted. The Asvinidevas wanted the ban Indra had placed on drinking soma lifted. Cyavana began a yajna and invited all the devas, including Indra and the Ashvinidevas. Indra objected to the Asvinidevas partaking in the soma and began a fight with Cyavana. At that time, Cyavana calls upon Mada, who appears out of the sacrificial fire. Once Indra surrenders, Cyavana withdraws Mada and tears him into four pieces.

== See also ==
- Arishadvargas, six enemies
- Indra's major adversaries:
  - Vritra
  - Indrajit
