= Yamunacharya =

Hindu philosopher and religious leader

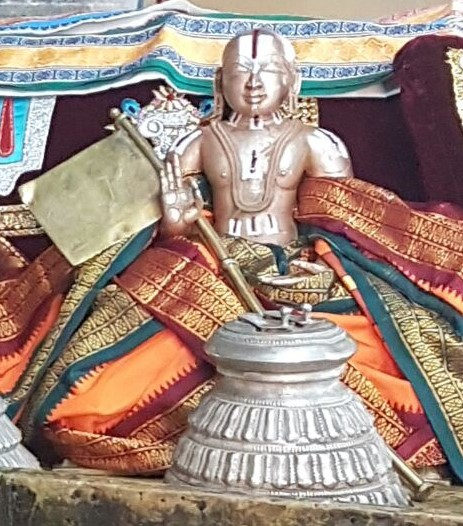
- Statuette of Yamunacharya

Personal life
- Born: Kattumannarkoil, Tamil Nadu, India
- Died: Srirangam

Religious life
- Religion: Hinduism
- Denomination: Sri Vaishnavism
- Philosophy: Vishistadvaita

Yamunacharya (IAST: Yāmunāchārya), also known as Alavandar and Yamunaithuraivan, was a Vishishtadvaita philosopher based in Srirangam, Tamil Nadu, India. He is best known as a preceptor of Ramanuja, one of the principal leaders of the Sri Vaishnava tradition. He was born in the early 10th century CE and was the grandson of Nathamuni, a famed yogi who collected the works of the Tamil Alvars.

== Life ==
=== Debate and Royal Patronage ===
Yamunacharya lived from around 918–1038 CE and grew up studying Vedic texts under Rama Misra, developing great skill in the mimamsa philosophy. According to Sri Vaishnava tradition, as a teenager he challenged Akkiyalvan, the court scholar of the Pandya king, to a debate. Upon seeing the youth's age, Akkiyalvan sarcastically asked, "Aalavandharaa?" (meaning "Has he come to rule me?"). Yamunacharya defeated Akkiyalvan by logically proving that Akkiyalvan's mother was barren, the king was not righteous, and the queen was unchaste. The king and queen, impressed that the boy had understood the shortcomings of logic, adopted him. The queen hailed the youth with the title "Alavandar" ("one who came to rule"). In other versions of the legend, he was given half the kingdom. There is no historical record documenting his rule, suggesting that this event may have occurred in a local chieftaincy rather than the main Pandya kingdom.

=== Renunciation and Leadership at Srirangam ===
According to the tradition, Yamunacharya initially lived as a king before Rama Misra (a disciple of Pundarikaksa, who was a student of Nathamuni) introduced him to the teachings of the Bhagavad Gita. After years of royal life, Yamunacharya went with Rama Misra to Srirangam. There, he renounced his royal life and became a devotee. According to Sri Vaishnava tradition, Yamunacharya received the hymns of Nammalvar from Rama Misra, who had received them from Pundarikaksa. Yamunacharya gave these hymns to his disciple Gosthipurna. Yamunacharya had several disciples, whom he initiated through five Vaishnava rites, knows as pancha-samskara.

According to the tradition, Yamunacharya visited Kanchipuram, where he saw Ramanuja, a student of Yadavaprakasa, and wished to make him his disciple. Ramanuja later learned about Yamunacharya from Mahapurna, a disciple of Yamunacharya, and traveled with him to Srirangam, but Yamunacharya died before they arrived. Three of Yamunacharya's fingers are said to have remained bent after his death, which Ramanuja interpreted as representing three unfulfilled wishes:

- To spread the doctrine of prapatti (surrender to God) and teach the works of the Alvars.
- To write a commentary on the Brahma Sutras according to Sri Vaishnava teachings.
- To compose further works on Sri Vaishnavism.

== Works ==
Alavandar, like his successor Ramanuja, focused both on philosophical debates defending Vishishtadvaita against Advaita and rival doctrines. His bhakti (devotional) prayers and philosophical works are written in Sanskrit, although he systematically preserved and codified the heritage of the Tamil Alvars. The major works attributed to him are:

- Chatuh Shloki – A four-verse hymn in praise of the goddess Lakshmi and her divine attributes.
- Stotra Ratna – A 65-verse devotional hymn ("Gem of Hymns") in praise of Narayana (Vishnu).
- Siddhitraya – A foundational philosophical treatise comprising three parts devoted to the three fundamental doctrines of Vishishtadvaita: Ātmasiddhi (demonstration of individual self), Īśvarasiddhi (demonstration of God), and Saṁvitsiddhi (demonstration of real empirical perception).
- Agama Pramanya – A work establishing the canonical authority and the Vedic validity of the Pancharatra agama scriptures.
- Maha Purusha Nirnayam – A now-lost treatise extolling the divine couple Lakshmi-Narayana as the Ultimate Reality.
- Gitartha Sangraha – A 32-verse summary and commentary outlining the central themes of the Bhagavad Gita.
  - Yamunacharya writes that God is attained through bhaktiyoga.
- Nityam – A short liturgical manual detailing daily ritual worship duties.

== Sources ==
- Chari, S. M. Srinivasa (1994). Vaishnavism: Its Philosophy, Theology and Religious Discipline. Motilal Banarsidass.
- Dasgupta, Surendranath (1940). A History Of Indian Philosophy Vol. 3. Motilal Banarsidass. p. 97.
- Dasgupta, Surendranath (1991). A History of Indian Philosophy, Volume 3. Motilal Banarsidass. ISBN 978-8120804142.
