= Ramanuja =

11th-12th century Indian philosopher

Sri Ramanuja
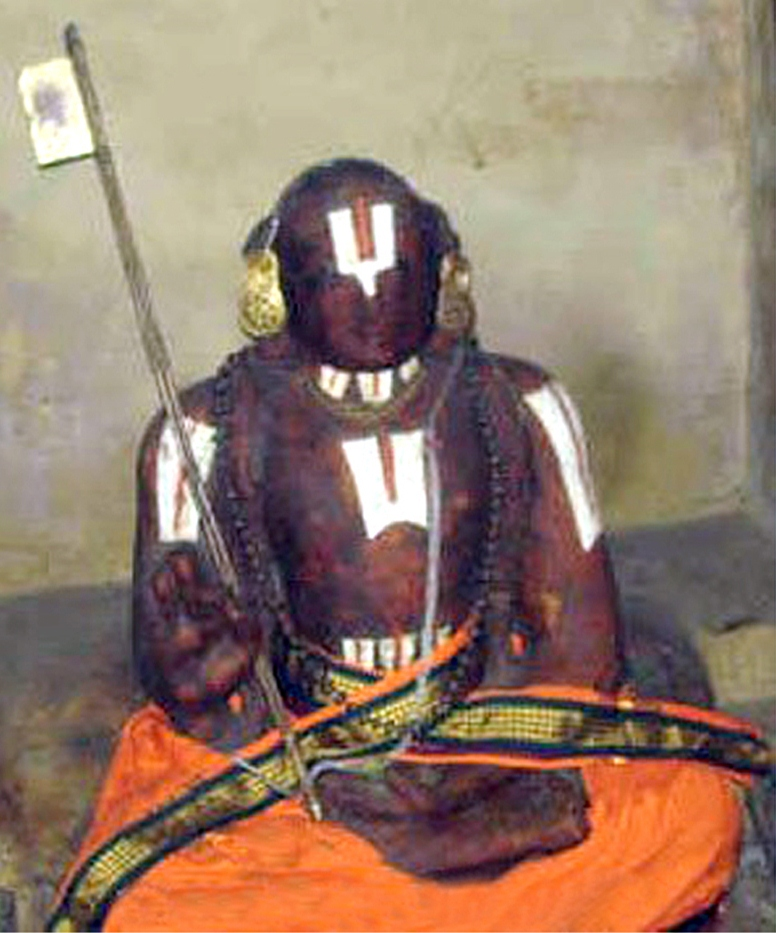

Personal life
- Born: Iḷaiyāḻvār hārītasa 1077 (Note: The Tradition dates his birth at 1017 and his death at 1137, giving him a lifespan of c. 120 years. This dating has been questioned by modern scholarship, based on temple records and regional literature of 11th- and 12th-century outside the Sri Vaishnava tradition, and modern era scholars suggest that Ramanuja may have lived between 1077–1157 CE, giving a lifespan of c. 80 years.) Sriperumbudur, Chola Empire (present-day Tamil Nadu, India)
- Died: 1157 (aged 79–80) Srirangam, Chola Empire (present-day Tamil Nadu, India)
- Parents: Keshavasomayaji (father); Kanthimathi Devi (mother)
- Notable work(s): Traditionally 9 Sanskrit texts, including Vedarthasamgraha, Sri Bhashya, Gita Bhashya
- Honors: Emperumānār, Udaiyavar, Yatirāja (king of sannyasis)

Religious life
- Religion: Hinduism
- Philosophy: Vishishtadvaita
- Sect: Sri Vaishnavism
- Movement: Bhakti

Religious career
- Teacher: periya nambi
- Influenced by: Nathamuni; Yamunacharya
- Influenced: Ramananda

Ramanuja ([ɾaːmaːnudʑɐ]; Middle Tamil: Rāmāṉujam; Classical Sanskrit: Rāmānuja; c. 1077 – 1157), also known as Rāmānujācārya, was an Indian Hindu philosopher, guru and social reformer. He is one of the most important exponents of the Sri Vaishnavism tradition in Hinduism. His philosophical foundations for devotional practice were influential in the Bhakti movement.

Ramanuja's guru was Yādava Prakāśa, a scholar who, traditionally, is said to have belonged to the Advaita Vedānta tradition, but probably was a Bhedabheda scholar. Sri Vaishnava tradition holds that Ramanuja disagreed with his guru and the non-dualistic Advaita Vedānta, and instead followed in the footsteps of Tamil Alvārs tradition, the scholars Nāthamuni and Yamunāchārya. Ramanuja is famous as the chief proponent of Vishishtadvaita school of Vedānta, and his disciples were likely authors of texts such as the Shatyayaniya Upanishad. Ramanuja himself wrote influential texts, such as Sanskrit bhāsyas on the Brahma Sutras and the Bhagavad Gita.

His Vishishtadvaita (qualified non-dualism) philosophy has competed with the Dvaita (theistic dualism) philosophy of Madhvāchārya, and Advaita (non-dualism) philosophy of Ādi Shankara, together the three most influential Vedantic philosophies of the 2nd millennium. Ramanuja presented the epistemic and soteriological importance of bhakti, or the devotion to a personal God (Vishnu in Ramanuja's case) as a means to spiritual liberation. His ontology affirms an inseparable relationship (apṛthak-siddhi) between īśvara (Brahman/Vishnu), cit (individual conscious souls), and acit (insentient matter). In Ramanuja's doctrine of salvation, individual self retains its distinct existence and agency in liberation (moksha), while realizing communion with Brahman through eternal devotional service (kaiṅkarya) as opposed to ontological identity.

== Early life ==
Ramanuja was born into a Tamil Brahmin community, in a village called Sriperumbudur (present-day Tamil Nadu) under the Chola Empire. His followers in the Vaishnava tradition wrote hagiographies, some of which were composed centuries after his death, and which the tradition believes "at face value."

The traditional hagiographies of Ramanuja state he was born to mother Kānthimathi and father Asuri Keshava Somayāji, in Sriperumbudur, near modern Chennai, Tamil Nādu. He is believed to have been born in the month of Chithirai under the star Tiruvadhirai. They place his life from 1017–1137, yielding a lifespan of 120 years. However, based on 11th- and 12th-century temple records and regional literature outside the Sri Vaishnava tradition, modern era scholars suggest that Ramanuja might have lived from 1077–1157. Paul syndor notes that "reconstructing his 'historical life' is nearly impossible," and such efforts as Carman's datings (1077-1157), although "well-reasoned," are speculative and "ultimately unverifiable."

Ramanuja married, moved to Kānchipuram, and studied with Yādava Prakāśa as his guru. Ramanuja and his guru frequently disagreed in interpreting Vedic texts, particularly the Upanishads. Ramanuja and Yādava Prakāśa separated, and thereafter Ramanuja continued his studies on his own.

He attempted to meet another famed Vedanta scholar of 11th-century Yamunāchārya, but Sri Vaishnava tradition holds that the latter died before the meeting and they never met. Ramanuja was the great-grandson of Yamunāchārya through a granddaughter. However, some hagiographies assert that the corpse of Yamunāchārya miraculously rose and named Ramanuja as the new leader of Sri Vaishnava sect previously led by Yamunāchārya. One hagiography states that after leaving Yādava Prakāśa, Ramanuja was initiated into Sri Vaishnavism by Periya Nambi, also called Mahapurna, another Vedānta scholar. Ramanuja renounced his married life, and became a Hindu monk. However, Katherine Young states that evidence on whether Ramanuja led a married or renunciate life is uncertain.

== Career ==
At Kānchipuram, Ramanuja engaged in devotional service (kainkaryam) under the guidance of Thirukkachi Nambi at the Varadharāja Perumal temple. In his explanation of Vedanta, he voiced against the Advaitic division of Brahman into higher attributeless (nirguṇa) and lower qualified (saguṇa) levels. Ramanuja preached that Brahman is identical with Vishnu–Narayana, possessing an infinite number of auspicious attributes (kalyāṇaguṇa). He interpreted that scriptural passages declaring Brahman to be nirguṇa negate mundane and defiling attributes (heya-guṇa), rather than implying an absence of attributes altogether. Ramanuja has long enjoyed foremost authority in the Sri Vaishnava tradition.

=== Hagiographies ===
A number of traditional biographies of Ramanuja are known, some written in 12th century, some written centuries later such as 14th and 15th century, whereas some as far as the 17th or 18th century, particularly after the split of the Śrīvaiṣṇava community into the Vadakalais and Teṉkalais, where each community created its own version of Ramanuja's hagiography based on earlier primary writings. The Muvāyirappaṭi Guruparamparāprabhāva by Brahmatantra Svatantra Jīyar represents the earliest Vadakalai biography, and reflects the Vadakalai view of the succession following Ramanuja. Ārāyirappaṭi Guruparamparāprabhāva, on the other hand, represents the Tenkalai biography. Other biographies include the Yatirajavaibhavam by Andhrapurna, who was the direct disciple of Ramanuja.

== Historical background ==
Ramanuja grew up in the Tamil culture, in a stable society during the rule of the Chola dynasty. This period was one of pluralistic beliefs, where Vaishnava, Shaiva, Smarta traditions, Buddhism and Jainism thrived together. In Hindu monastic tradition, Advaita Vedānta had been dominant, and Ramanuja's guru Yādava Prākāsha belonged to this tradition. Prior to Ramanuja, the Sri Vaishnava sampradaya was already an established organization under Yamunāchārya, and bhakti songs and devotional ideas were already a part of Tamil culture because of the twelve Alvārs. Ramanuja's fame grew because he was considered the first thinker in centuries that disputed Shankara's theories, and offered an alternative interpretation of Upanishadic scriptures.

=== Early life ===
When Ramanuja and his guru Yadava Prakaasa parted ways due to their differences in interpreting the Vedic literature, Ramanuja became a devotee of the Varadaraja Perumal temple in Kanchi. During this period, Ramanuja's discourses and fame reached far and wide. Yamunacharya, the Vaishnavite acharya and the religious head of the Ranganathasamy temple at Srirangam had been closely following Ramanuja from a very young age. When it was time to pass on the legacy, the acharya sent Mahapurna, a disciple assisting him in temple affairs, to Kanchi to invite Ramanuja to Srirangam.

When Mahapurna met Ramanuja and informed him of his guru's desire, Ramanuja was overjoyed and they both immediately left for Srirangam. But bad news awaited them at Srirangam and they both learned that Yamunacharya had died. Heart-broken, Ramanuja then left for Kanchi and refused to worship Sri Ranganatha for he held him responsible for taking away Yamunacharya from this world. As for Mahapurna, he began to assist Tiruvaranga Araiyar, the son of Yamunacharya in managing the temple affairs. But as time passed by, Tiruvaranga Araiyar and other senior members of the Vaishnavite order felt that there was a vacuum after Yamunacharya's demise and that they lacked a person who could interpret the Vedas and Sastras like Yamunacharya. So it was finally decided that Sri Mahapurna should once again go and invite Ramanuja to Srirangam.

Meanwhile, in Kanchi, Ramanuja regularly met with Kanchipurna, a fellow devotee. Ramanuja decided that he would become Kanchipurna's disciple, but Kanchipurna politely refused, saying he was not of the same caste and that Ramanuja would find a more appropriate guru. Kanchipurna then left for Tirupati to worship Venkateswara and returned after six months. Upon his return, he conveyed that Lord Varadaraja (a form of Vishnu) wished Ramanuja to go to Srirangam and find solace in Mahapurna.

=== Induction into Vaishnavism ===
After it was decided that Mahapurna would go and invite Ramanuja to Srirangam, the acharya left for Kanchi with his wife. While on his way to Kanchi, Mahapurna and his wife decided to take some rest at Maduranthakam, a place that is located 40 km from present day Chennai. As fate would have it Ramanuja, who was on his way to Srirangam, arrived at the same place and to his joy found Mahapurna. They soon embraced each other and Ramanuja requested that he waste no time in initiating him into the Vaishnavite order. Mahapurna immediately obliged and Ramanuja received the Panchasamskaras (the five sacraments).

=== Persecution ===
Some hagiographies, composed centuries after Ramanuja died, state that a Chola king, Kulothunga II, had immense hatred towards Sri Vaishnavism. He was called Krimikanta Chola or "worm-necked Chola", so named because the king is said to have suffered from the cancer of the neck or throat. Historian Nilakanta Sastri identifies Krimikanta Chola with Adhirajendra Chola or Virarajendra Chola. Knowing the evil intentions of the king, Ramanuja's disciple, Koorathazhwan persuaded Ramanuja to leave the Chola kingdom. Ramanuja then moved to Hoysala kingdom, where he spent 14 years. During this period, he converted a Jain king, Bitti Deva, to Hinduism after miraculously healing his daughter. Bitti Deva changed his name to Vishnuvardhana. King Vishnuvardhana assisted Ramanuja in building a temple of Lord Thirunarayanaswamy at Melukote, which is now a temple town in Mandya district of Karnataka. Ramanuja later returned on his own to Tamil Nādu after the death of Krimikanta Chola. According to Sastri, Krimikanta or Adhirajendra Chola was killed in a local uprising of the Vaishnavas.

According to "Koil Olugu" (temple records) of the Srirangam temple, Kulottunga III was the son of Krimikanta Chola or Karikala Chola. The former, unlike his father, is said to have been a repentant son who supported Vaishnavism. Ramanuja is said to have made Kulottunga III as a disciple of his nephew, Dasarathi. The king then granted the management of the Ranganathaswamy temple to Dasarathi and his descendants as per the wish of Ramanuja. Some historians hold that Krimikanta, who persecuted Ramanuja, had a personal animosity towards Ramanuja and did not persecute Vaishnavites.

=== Reformation ===
The early Sri Vaishnavite community recognized spriritual authority irrespective of birth. For example, Ramanuja sought spiritual instructions from Kanchipurna (Thirukkachi Nambi), a non-Brahmin devotee, while his formal preceptor Mahapurna (Periya Nambi) was a Brahmin. Mahapurna later on performed the funeral rites for Maraner Nambi, a low-caste Vaishnava disciple of Yamunacharya. When Ramanuja revolted against the discrimination that had crept into the caste system, he was following the same lines as the Alwars, helping those considered untouchables (dasa, dasulu, dasu), to be absorbed into the Sri Vaishnava Bhakti Movement, and encouraging them to attain Spiritual enlightenment by teaching them Sri Alwar Divyaprabandham. He called these downtrodden classes as Tirukulattar, meaning "of noble descent" in Tamil, and was instrumental in admitting them into the temple at Melukote.

Ramanuja's liberal views also led to the reorganization of rituals in Srirangam and the involvement of non-Brahmin people in the Vaishnava worship. This policy change contributed to the enhancement of social status for artisanal and other non-Brahmin caste groups, especially the weavers (Sengunthar Kaikola Mudaliyar), who were one of the chief beneficiaries. After Ramanuja's period, the Sri Vaishnava community split on this issue and formed the Vadakalai (northern and Sanskritic) and Thenkalai (southern and Tamil) sects. Both sects believe in initiation into Sri Vaishnavism through Pancha Samskara. This ceremony or rite of passage is necessary for one to become a Sri Vaishnava. It is performed by Brahmins and non-Brahmins in order to become Vaishnavas.

== Attempts on Ramanuja's life ==
There were multiple attempts on Ramanuja's life. When he was a student under Yadava Prakasa, the latter grew jealous of Ramanuja's rise to fame. So Yadava Prakasa tried to get rid of Ramanuja during a tour to the Ganges in northern India. Govinda, Ramanuja's cousin (son of his mother's sister), learned of this plot and warned Ramanuja who then left the group and escaped to Kanchi with the help of an elderly hunter couple. Later Yadava Prakasa realised his folly and became a disciple under Ramanuja.

Later another attempt was made on Ramanuja's life while he was about to take charge of the temple affairs in Srirangam. The head priest of the Ranganathaswamy Temple, Srirangam did not like Ramanuja and decided to kill him. Accordingly, he invited Ramanuja to his house for having food and planned to kill him by poisoning his food. However, when Ramanuja arrived, the priest's wife saw the divine glow of Ramanuja and immediately confessed her husband's plan. This did not deter the priest who then made another attempt when Ramanuja visited the temple. He poisoned the temple Theertham (holy water) and served it to Ramanuja. To the priest's great surprise Ramanuja, instead of dying, began to dance with joy. The priest realised his mistake and fell at the feet of Ramanuja.

== Writings ==
The Sri Vaisnava tradition attributes nine Sanskrit texts to Ramanuja – Vedarthasamgraha (literally, "Summary of the Vedas's meaning"), Sri Bhashya (a review and commentary on the Brahma Sutras), Bhagavad Gita Bhashya (a review and commentary on the Bhagavad Gita), and the minor works titled Vedantadipa, Vedantasara, Gadya Trayam (which is a compilation of three texts called the Sharanagati Gadyam, Sriranga Gadyam, and the Vaikuntha Gadyam), and the Nitya Grantham.

Some scholars have questioned the authenticity of all other writings except the three of the largest works credited to Ramanuja — Sri Bhashya, Vedarthasamgraha, and the Bhagavad Gita Bhashya — and the Gadya Trayam he composed in Srirangam.

== Philosophy ==
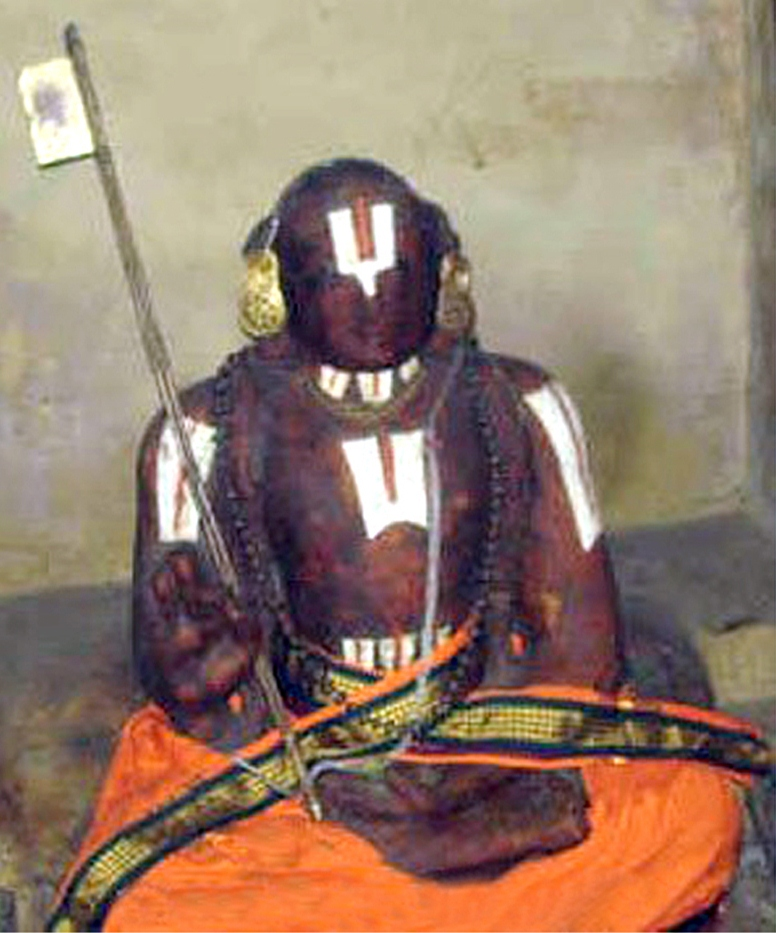
The figure of Ramanuja in Upadesa Mudra inside the Ranganathaswamy Temple, Srirangam. It is believed to be his preserved mortal remains.

Ramanuja's philosophical foundation was qualified monism, and is called Vishishtadvaita in the Hindu tradition. His ideas are one of three subschools in Vedānta, the other two are known as Ādi Shankara's Advaita (absolute monism) and Madhvāchārya's Dvaita (dualism).

=== Rāmānuja's Epistemology ===
Rāmānuja's epistemology is hyperrealistic or similar to naïve empiricism. The first two sources of knowledge are perception and inference, and they are trustworthy notwithstanding general human subjection to "beginningless ignorance." Knowledge is always of the real, even in dreams, and error is a disordered perception or faulty inference concerning what is really there. The third source of knowledge is the testimony of scripture, or more strictly, śabda ("eternal sound"), which helps to establish much that is uncertain on the basis of sense perception and inference, notably the existence and nature of the ultimate reality (brahman). Though unlike some proponents of naïve empiricism, Rāmānuja does not think that it suffices to intermittently have an acquaintance with objects of knowledge. Knowledge (jñāna) only occurs when there is direct perception of an object. Unlike proper empiricists, Rāmānuja does not restrict knowledge to that which can be gathered from the senses. Rāmānuja asserts that knowledge about God comes exclusively from the Vedic scriptures, particularly the Upanisads, rather than from sensory perception or logical inference.

Rāmānuja was unique in his view that bhakti or devotion is itself an epistemic state. He says that when bhakti takes firm root in an individual, it turns into parabhakti, which is the highest form of bhakti and that bhakti is the direct awareness of Brahman's nature and thus is a kind of knowledge (jñāna).

=== Ramanuja's Ontology ===
Being a realist, Rāmānuja firmly opposed the notion of māyā (illusion). In his understanding, three distinct realities exist: a vast expanse of material objects, countless conscious souls within material bodies, and the transcendent Brahman. Each of these categories possesses a different degree of awareness, from the non-aware material world to the fully-aware Brahman, but they are all equally real. In Rāmānuja's interpretation of advaita (non-dualism), it is not a form of advaita as proposed by Shankara. Rāmānuja's conception of bhakti maintains that there must always be a separation between the lover (the soul) and the beloved (Vishnu), for true love cannot exist without distinct identities. His stance suggests a qualified non-dualism, where both the souls and the material world, though deeply interconnected with Brahman, eternally remain different from Brahman.

In Rāmānuja's philosophy, the foundational concept of the soul-body model revolves around the idea that the entire universe, including both souls (jivas) and matter (prakrti), serves as the body (sarira) of God, referred to as "sarira-sariri-bhava", where "sarira" means body and "sariri" means the indwelling soul or consciousness. This concept is rooted in sruti passages like Brihadaranyaka Upanishad 3.7.3-23:

"This soul of yours who is present within but is different from all beings, whom all beings do not know. whose body is all beings, and who controls all beings from within - he is the Inner Controller, the immortal one" - Brihadaranyaka Upanishad 3.7.14

=== Rāmānuja's Soteriology ===
According to Rāmānuja, the highest good lies in realizing our true nature and of understanding the true essence of Brahman. Moksha, or spiritual liberation, is seen as the joy of contemplating Brahman (rather than release from the life-death-rebirth cycle), and that joy is the result of devotion, praise, worship and contemplation of divine perfection. Knowledge of Brahman consists in liberation, for Rāmānuja, mainly because of the character of Brahman. According to Ramanuja, Brahman encompasses everything but is not uniform in nature. It includes elements of plurality, allowing it to manifest in a diverse world. Ramanuja views Brahman as a personal god who rules over a real world filled with his spirit. He believes Brahman to have the attributes of "omnipotence, omniscience and infinite love". He writes:

"Entities other than Brahman can be objects of such cognitions of the nature of joy only to a finite extent and for limited duration. But Brahman is such that cognizing of him is an infinite and abiding joy. It is for this reason that the śruti [scripture] says, `Brahman is bliss' (Taittirīya Upaniṣad II.6.) Since the form of cognition as joy is determined by its object, Brahman itself is joy."

Rāmānuja clarifies that mere theoretical knowledge of Brahman's nature is insufficient for attaining moksha. According to Rāmānuja, bhakti yoga, the discipline of devotion or worship, is the effective means for liberation. In his interpretation, moksha is not a negative separation from transmigration, or a series of rebirths, but rather the joy of the contemplating the divine perfection. This joy is attained by a life of exclusive devotion (bhakti) to Brahman, singing his praise, performing adulatory acts in temple and private worship, and constantly dwelling on his perfections. In return, Brahman will offer his grace, which will assist the devotee in gaining release.

Alongside bhakti-yoga, which required rigorous meditative discipline and adherence to spiritual duties, Ramanuja proffered sharanagati (prapatti, comlete surrender to Vishnu) as an autonomous path to liberation (mokśa) in detail in his prose hymn Śaraṇāgati Gadya. In Vishishtadvaita soteriology, while bhakti-yoga was restricted by traditional Vedic eligibility requirements (adhikara), prapatti was open to all individuals regardless of caste, status, or gender. This doctrine emphasizes divine grace and the soul's total dependence (śeṣatva) on the Lord. This establishes surrender as both a self-sufficient means to moksha and a foundation for subsequent Sri Vaishnava devotional theology.

=== Ramanuja's Ethics ===
Ramanuja's ethical framework asserts that morality has both intrinsic and instrumental value. Intrinsically, morality mirrors the divine nature of God, who is morally perfect and needs no external reasons to be moral. Instrumentally, morality serves as a means to alleviate the karmic burdens of past wrongdoings and to appease the divine, thus facilitating spiritual liberation. Ramanuja emphasizes that while detachment through jnana yoga is possible in theory, it is impractical for most. Instead, he advocates karma yoga, which involves fulfilling duties based on individual capabilities and nature, making morality accessible and suited to individual lives.

=== Criticism of Sankara ===
Ramanuja argued that Shankara's interpretation of the Upanishads had serious errors. He had four major objections:

1. Brahman was differentiated consciousness and not undifferentiated consciousness.
2. Shankara's concept of Nirguna Brahman was wrong and untenable.
3. Beginningless karma, and not superimposition, was the cause of avidya.
4. Sankara's doctrine of Avidya (Ignorance) and Maya (Illusion) has seven major flaws and inconsistencies.

=== Hermeneutic Criticism ===
==== Vedas as Doctrinally Unified Corpus ====
Ramanuja accepted that the Vedas are a reliable source of knowledge, then critiqued other schools of Hindu philosophy, including Advaita Vedānta, as having failed in interpreting all of the Vedic texts. He asserted, in his Sri Bhāshya, that purvapaksin (previous schools) selectively interpret those Upanishadic passages that support their monistic interpretation, and ignore those passages that support the pluralism interpretation. There is no reason, stated Ramanuja, to prefer one part of a scripture and not other, the whole of the scripture must be considered on par. One cannot, according to Ramanuja, attempt to give interpretations of isolated portions of any scripture. Rather, the scripture must be considered one integrated corpus, expressing a consistent doctrine. The Vedic literature, asserted Ramanuja, mention both plurality and oneness, therefore the truth must incorporate pluralism and monism, or qualified monism.

This method of scripture interpretation distinguishes Ramanuja from Ādi Shankara. Shankara's exegetical approach Samanvayat Tatparya Linga with Anvaya-Vyatireka, states that for proper understanding, all texts must be examined in their entirety, and then their intent established by six characteristics. These include studying what the author states as his goal, what he repeats in his explanation, what he states as his conclusion, and whether it can be epistemically verified. Not everything in any text, states Shankara, has equal weight and some ideas are the essence of any expert's textual testimony. This philosophical difference in scriptural studies helped Shankara conclude that the Principal Upanishads primarily teach monism with teachings such as Tat tvam asi, while helping Ramanuja conclude that qualified monism is at the foundation of Hindu spirituality.

=== Comparison with other Vedānta schools ===
Ramanuja's Vishishtadvaita shares the theistic devotionalism ideas with Madhvāchārya's Dvaita. Both schools assert that Jīva (souls) and Brahman (as Vishnu) are different, a difference that is never transcended. God Vishnu alone is independent, all other gods and beings are dependent on Him, according to both Madhvāchārya and Ramanuja. However, in contrast to Madhvāchārya's views, Ramanuja asserts "qualified non-dualism", that souls share the same essential nature of Brahman, and that there is a universal sameness in the quality and degree of bliss possible for human souls, and every soul can reach the bliss state of God Himself. While the 13th- to 14th-century Madhavāchārya asserted both "qualitative and quantitative pluralism of souls", Ramanuja asserted "qualitative monism and quantitative pluralism of souls", states Sharma.

Ramanuja's Vishishtadvaita school and Shankara's Advaita school are both nondualistic Vedānta schools, both are premised on the assumption that all souls can hope for and achieve the state of blissful liberation; in contrast, Madhvāchārya believed that some souls are eternally doomed and damned. Shankara's theory posits that only Brahman and causes are metaphysical unchanging reality, while the empirical world (Maya) and observed effects are changing, illusive and of relative existence. Spiritual liberation to Shankara is the full comprehension and realization of oneness of one's unchanging Ātman (soul) as the same as Ātman in everyone else as well as being identical to the nirguna Brahman. In contrast, Ramanuja's theory posits both Brahman and the world of matter are two different absolutes, both metaphysically real, neither should be called false or illusive, and saguna Brahman with attributes is also real. Ramanuja views Brahman as the inner ruler, all knowing, and the "essence of the soul". He describes Brahman as the source of intelligence, truth and bliss, and as the controller of the world. God, like man, states Ramanuja, has both soul and body, and all of the world of matter is the glory of God's body. The path to Brahman (Vishnu), asserted Ramanuja, is devotion to godliness and constant remembrance of the beauty and love of personal god (saguna Brahman, Vishnu).

== Influence ==
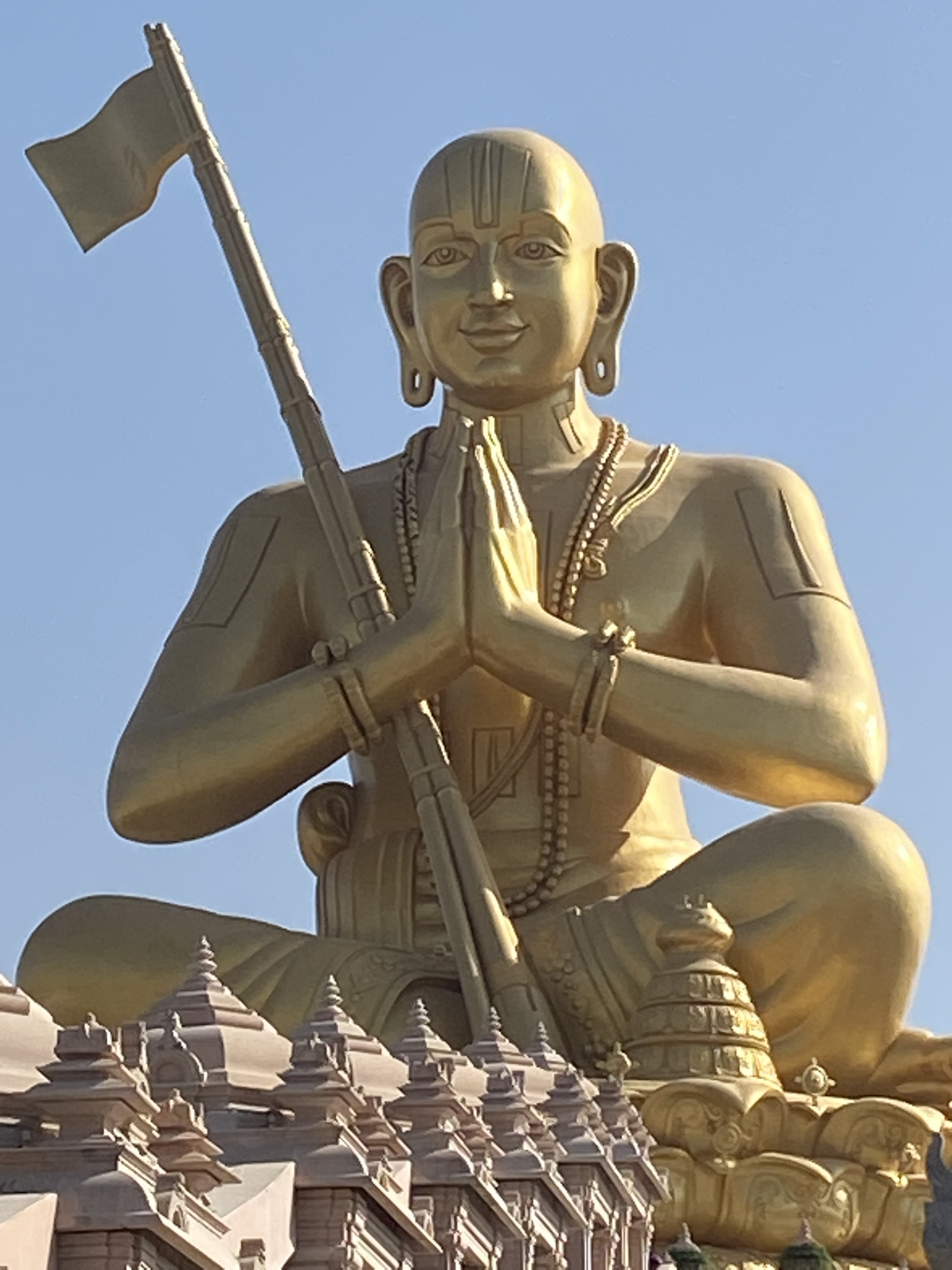
Statue of Equality, Hyderabad

Harold Coward describes Ramanuja as "the founding interpreter of Sri Vaisnavite scripture." Wendy Doniger calls him "probably the single most influential thinker of devotional Hinduism". J. A. B. van Buitenen states that Ramanuja was highly influential, by giving "bhakti an intellectual basis", and his efforts made bhakti the major force within different traditions of Hinduism.

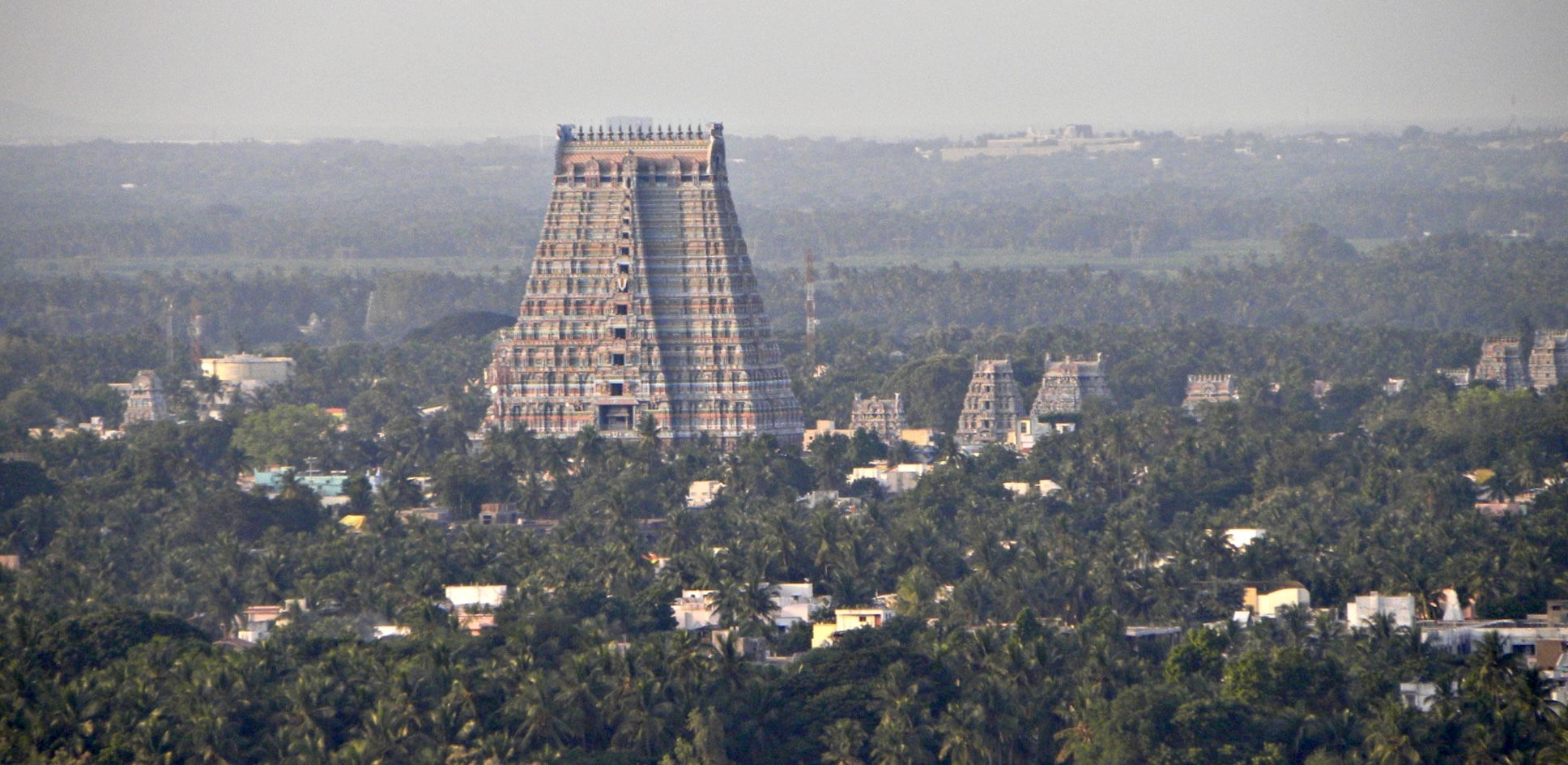
Major Vaishnava temples are associated with the Ramanuja's tradition, such as the above Srirangam Ranganatha temple in Tamil Nadu.

Modern scholars have compared the importance of Ramanuja in Hinduism to that of scholar Thomas Aquinas (1225–1274) in Western Christianity.

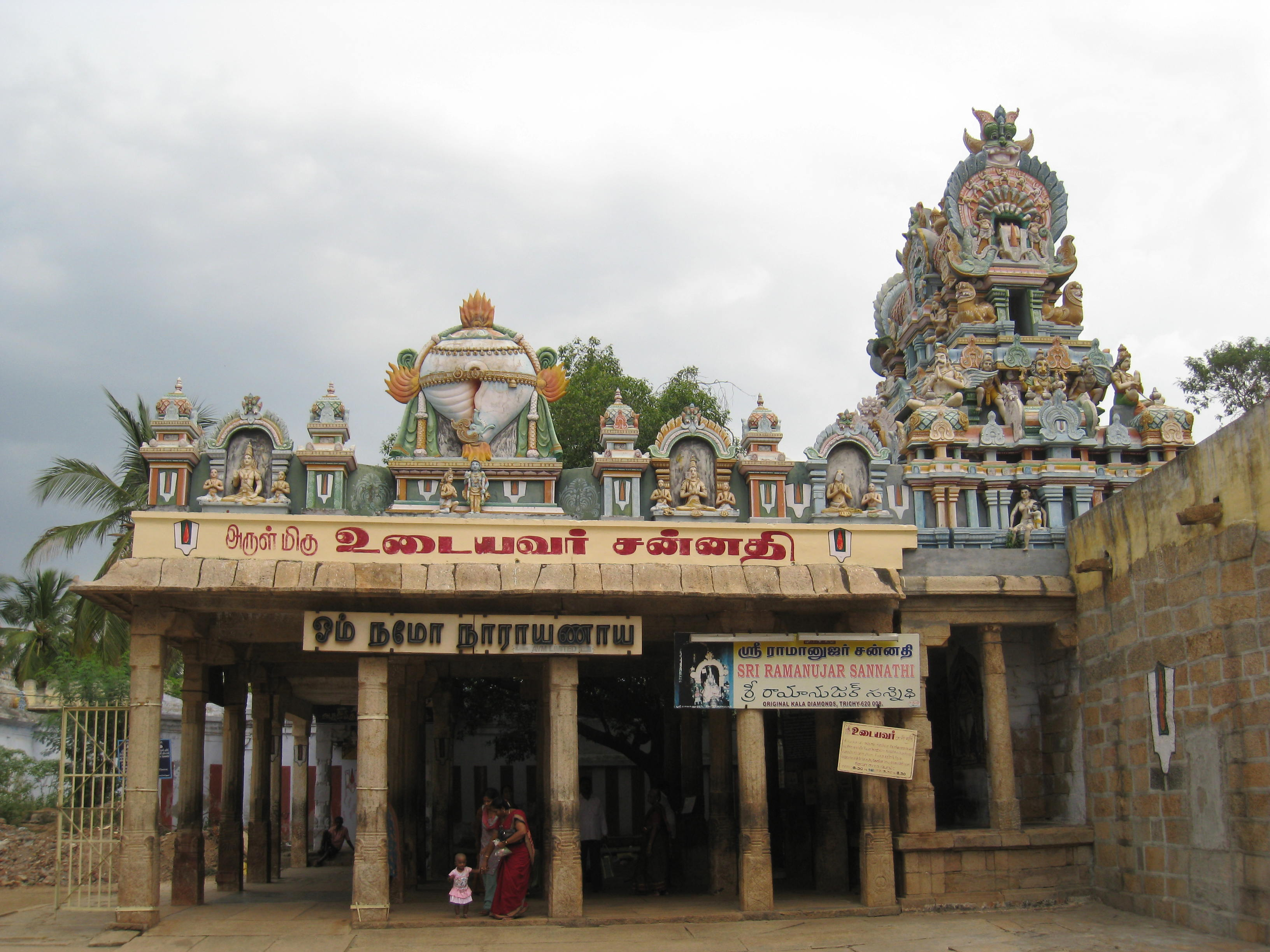
Sri Ramanuja Shrine at The Ranganathasamy Temple in Srirangam

Ramanuja reformed the Srirangam Ranganathaswamy temple complex, undertook tours across India, and expanded the reach of his organization. The temple organization became the stronghold of his ideas and his disciples. It was here that he wrote his influential Vishishtadvaita philosophy text, Sri Bhashyam.

Ramanuja not only developed theories and published philosophical works, but also organized a network of temples for Vishnu-Lakshmi worship. Ramanuja established centers of studies for his philosophy during the 11th and 12th centuries by traveling throughout India in that era, and these influenced generations of poet saints devoted to the Bhakti movement. Regional traditions assert that his visits, debates, and discourses triggered conversion of Jains and Buddhists to Vaishnavism in the Mysore and Deccan region.

The birthplace of Ramanuja near Chennai hosts a temple and is an active Vishishtadvaita school. His doctrines inspire a lively intellectual tradition, and his religious practices continue in major Vaishnava centres like the Ranganātha temple in Srirangam and the Venkateswara Temple in Tirupati.

The Statue of Equality in Hyderabad, planned by Chinna Jeeyar, is dedicated to Ramanuja. It was inaugurated by Indian Prime Minister Narendra Modi on 5 February 2022.

== Names ==
Ramanuja is also known as Śrī Rāmānujāchārya, Udaiyavar, Ethirājar (Yatirāja, king of monks), Bhashyakara (Bhashyakarulu in Telugu), Godāgrajar, Thiruppavai Jeeyar, Emberumānār and Lakshmana Muni

- 'Ilayazhwar' by Periya Thirumalai Nambi
- 'Boodha Puriser' by Sriperumbudur Adikesava Perumal
- 'Am Mudalvan Evan' by Yamunāchārya
- 'Ethirajar' and 'Ramanuja Muni' by Kanchi Perarulala Perumal
- 'Udayavar' by Srirangam Periya Perumal
- 'Emperumanar' by Tirukozhtiyur Nambi
- 'Tiruppavai Jeeyar' by Periya Nambi
- 'Lakshmana Muni' by Tiruvaranga Perumal Arayar
- 'Sadagopan Ponnadi' by Tirumalaiyandan
- 'Sri Bashyakarar' by Kalaimagal
- 'Desi Kendiran' by Tirupathi Thiruvenkatamudayan
- 'Koil Annan' by Srivilliputhur Kothai Nachiyar

== See also ==
- Adi Shankara
- Hindu philosophy
- Subala Upanishad – a minor Upanishad repeatedly cited by Ramanuja, and influential to his ideas
- Yoga (philosophy)
- Vishnuvardhana

== Sources ==
- Bartley, C. J. (2011). An introduction to Indian philosophy. London: Continuum. ISBN 978-1-84706-448-6.
- C. J. Bartley (2013). The Theology of Rāmānuja: Realism and Religion. Routledge. pp. 1–4, 52–53, 79. ISBN 978-1-136-85306-7.
- Bryant, Edwin (2007). Krishna : A Sourcebook (Chapter 15 by Deepak Sarma). Oxford University Press. ISBN 978-0195148923.
- Carman, John (1974). The Theology of Rāmānuja: An essay in interreligious understanding. Yale University Press. ISBN 978-0300015218.
- Carman, John B. (1994). Majesty and Meekness: A Comparative Study of Contrast and Harmony in the Concept of God. Wm. B. Eerdmans Publishing. ISBN 978-0802806932.
- Dasgupta, Surendranath (1991). A history of Indian philosophy. Motilal Banarsidass Publisher. ISBN 9788120804081.
- Dalal, Roshen (2011). Hinduism: An Alphabetical Guide. Penguin Books India. ISBN 978-0-14-341421-6.
- Jones, Constance; Ryan, James D. (2006), Encyclopedia of Hinduism, Infobase Publishing
- Govindacharya, A. (1906). The Life of Rāmānuja: The Exponent of the Viśistâdvaita Philosophy. S. Murthy.
- Grimes, John A. (1990), The Seven Great Untenables: Sapta-vidhā Anupapatti, Motilall Banarsidass
- Mayeda, Sengaku (2006). A thousand teachings : the Upadeśasāhasrī of Śaṅkara. Motilal Banarsidass. ISBN 978-81-208-2771-4.
- Narasimhacharya, Madabhushini (2004). Sri Ramanuja. New Delhi: Sahitya Akademi. ISBN 81-260-1833-X. OCLC 56904209.
- Nicholson, Andrew J. (2010), Unifying Hinduism: Philosophy and Identity in Indian Intellectual History, Columbia University Press
- Raman, Srilata (2020). "Reflections on the King of Ascetics (Yatirāja): Rāmānuja in the Devotional Poetry of Vedānta Deśika". In Goodall, Dominic; Hatley, Shaman; Isaacson, Harunaga; Raman, Srilata (eds.). Śaivism and the Tantric Traditions: Essays in Honour of Alexis G.J.S. Sanderson. Gonda Indological Studies. Vol. 22. Leiden: Brill Publishers. pp. 194–213. doi:10.1163/9789004432802_010. ISBN 978-90-04-43266-6. S2CID 225367594.
- Sharma, Chandradhar (1994). A Critical Survey of Indian Philosophy. Motilal Banarsidass. ISBN 978-81-208-0365-7.
- Stoker, Valerie (2011). "Madhva (1238-1317)". Internet Encyclopedia of Philosophy. Archived from the original on 12 October 2016.
- Keith E. Yandell (2001). Faith and Narrative. Oxford University Press. ISBN 978-0-19-535128-6.
