= Chatuh Shloki =

Sanskrit hymn

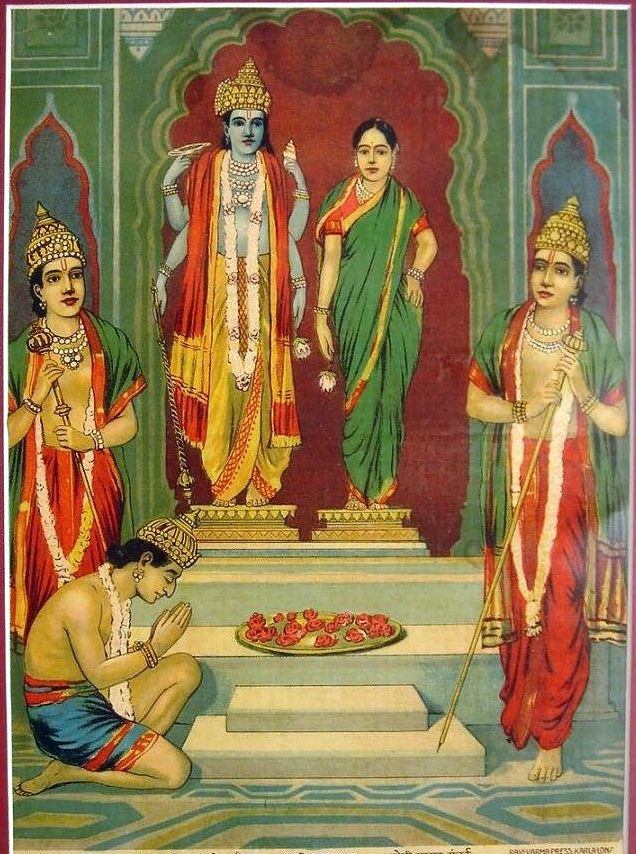
- Painting of Lakshmi (centre right) and her consort Vishnu (centre left), venerated in this work. Ravi Varma Press

Information
- Religion: Hinduism
- Author: Yamunacharya
- Language: Sanskrit
- Verses: 4

The Chatuh Shloki (Sanskrit: चतुःश्लोकी, romanized: Catuḥślokī) is a Sanskrit hymn by the Hindu philosopher Yamunacharya of the Sri Vaishnava tradition. Comprising four verses, the Chatuh Shloki extols Lakshmi, the consort of the deity Vishnu.

== Etymology ==
Chatuh Shloki is Sanskrit for "four verses".

== Description ==
The four stanzas of the work describe the various attributes of the goddess Lakshmi, her greatness and mercy, the grace she offers to her devotees, and her inseparability in form from her consort Vishnu (Lakshmi Narayana) respectively. Lakshmi is represented as an intermediary between a devotee and Vishnu; she is described to present a devotee's piety to her consort, offering her consort's grace to the devotee in turn. The work is regarded to be a pioneer in offering descriptions of the personality of the goddess and her relationship with a devotee and her consort in Vaishnava philosophy.

== Hymn ==
The first stanza of the hymn describes the attributes of Lakshmi and her standing among other beings:

kāntaste puruṣottamaḥ phaṇipatiḥ-śayanāsanam vāhanaṁ
vedātmā vihageśvaro yavanikā māyā jaganmohinī
brahmeśādi-suravrajaḥ sadayitas tvaddāsa-dāsīgaṇaḥ
śrīrityeva ca nāma te bhagavati brūmaḥ kathaṁ tvām vayam

Purushottama (an epithet of Vishnu) (is) your consort; the lord of the serpents (Shesha) (is) your throne; the king of the birds, (Garuda) whose body the Vedas are, (is) your mount; Maya (illusion), the world-enchantress (is) your veil; all the hosts of the devas with their consorts (are) your retinue of attendants and maids. Your name itself is Sri (prosperity). (Possessed of all this greatness, as you are), how can we (adequately) sing your praise?

— Chatuh Shloki, Verse 1

== See also ==
- Stotra Ratna
- Sri Stuti
- Ashtalakshmi Stotra
