= Sharanagati =

Hindu convention

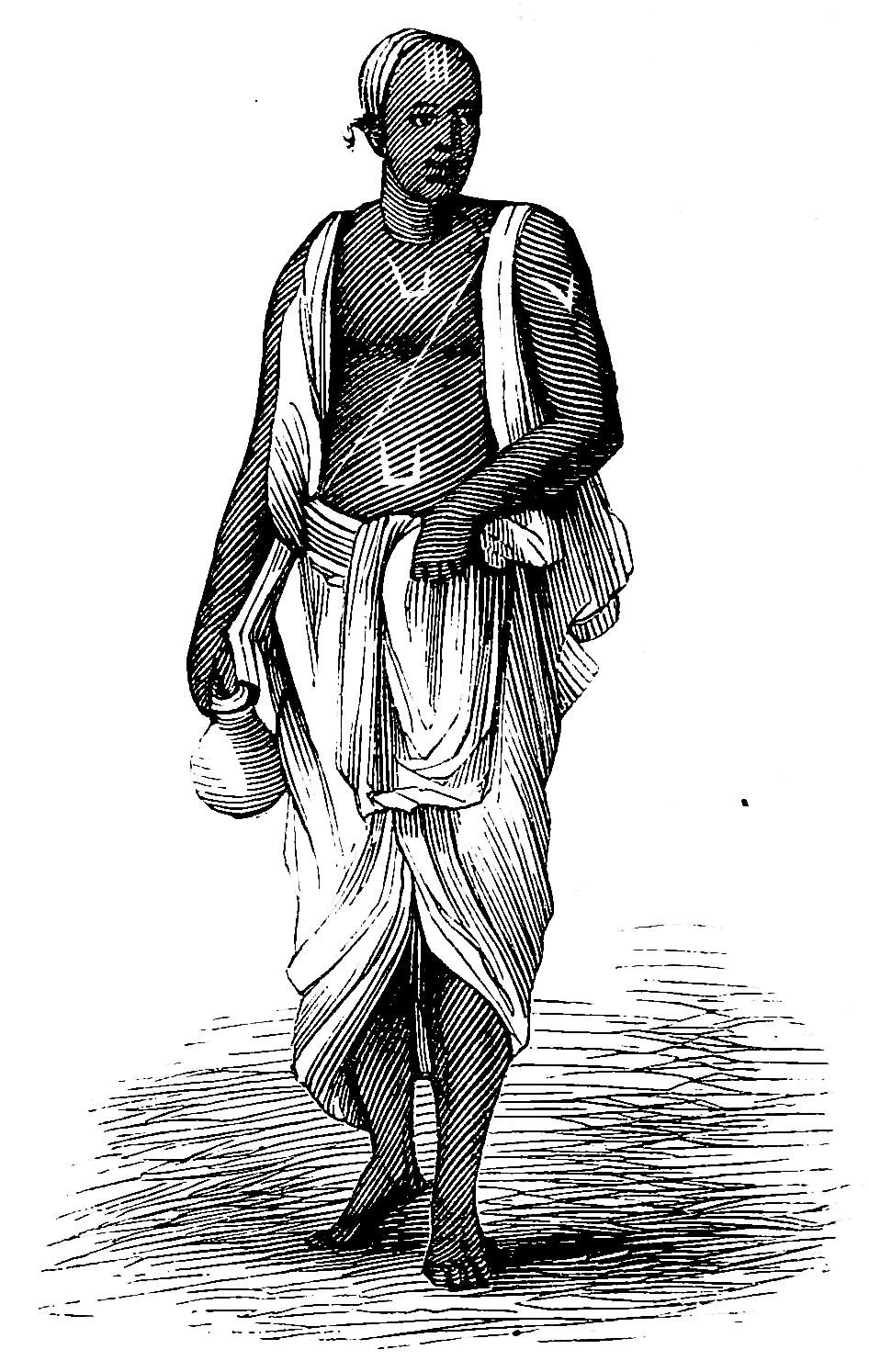
Depiction of a Vaishnava, a performer of this practice

Sharanagati (Sanskrit: शरणागति; IAST: Śaraṇāgati ) or Prapatti (Sanskrit: प्रपत्ति; IAST: Prapatti) is the process of total surrender to God (Narayana-Krishna) in Vaishnavism. The process of Sharanagati forms the basis of devotion to Vishnu in the bhakti traditions within the Sri Sampradaya, propounded by Ramanuja (1017–1137 CE), and the Gaudiya Sampradaya, founded by Chaitanya Mahaprabhu (1482–1533 CE). Ramanuja considered surrender to Vishnu and his consort Lakshmi to be the highest goal of life. Chaitanya emphasised surrender to Krishna and his consort Radha as supreme through physical surrender to the preceptor/guru.

== Etymology ==
In general, sharanagati means approach for protection. Prapatti comes from the Sanskrit root pad and the prefix pra (pra+pad), meaning "to take refuge with/in." In Sri Vaishnavism, it refers to the act of total self-surrender at the feet of God as a means to attain liberation (moksha), which is understood as joining "Vishnu's retinue" in Vaikuntha. Thus, prapatti is closely associated with the concept of soteriological surrender.

== Vatakalai and Tenkalai schools ==
In Sri Vaishnavism, the Vatakalai and Tenkalai schools understood prapatti as self-surrender to God. The concept was already expressed in the 11th-century writings of Ramanuja, though the two schools interpreted it differently. The Vatakalais viewed prapatti as one among several paths to liberation (moksha), suited for those unable to follow demanding practices. The Tenkalais saw prapatti as the sole path to liberation, with complete surrender through total reliance on God's grace.

== Literature ==
Sri Vaishnava texts recognize the practice of Sharanagati. Yamunacharya posited this approach as an alternative to the conventional practices of seeking salvation:

Na dharmamanistosmi na catmavedi

na bhaktimam stvaccaranaravinde \ akincano ananyagatissaranya tvatpadamulam saranam prapadye ||

The path of surrender (Saranagati) is open for one who is unable to follow the path of action (Karmayoga), knowledge (Jnanayoga) and devotion (Bhaktiyoga), and who has no other way of salvation

— Yamunacharya, Stotra Ratna

Vedanta Desika's commentary on this sloka offers his perspective:

Ahamasmyaparadhanamalayokincano gatihi

tvamevopayabtuto me bhaveti prarthanamatihi Saranagatirityukta sa deva smin prayujyatam

Saranagati is a state of mind of praying to God that he alone should become the means of saving the devotee, associated with the realisation that the devotee is utterly helpless, sinful, and without any other hope of salvation

— Vedanta Desika

Vedanta Desika's Niksheparaksha presents prapatti as a distinct and valid path to liberation, separate from the bhaktiyoga of Ramanuja's works. It follows the Sanskrit scholastic norms and omits references to Alvars and their texts. In this text, Vedanta Desika presents prapatti as grounded in the Caramashloka (Bhagavad Gita verse 18.66), where Krishna's invitation to surrender is interpreted as a self-sufficient means to salvation. While Ramanuja views the verse as affirming bhaktiyoga, Vedanta Desika sees it as emphasizing prapatti as an independent path.

== Initiation ==
The formal ritual of Sharanagati is a Vedic and Puranic scriptural and tradition backed ritual called the Pancha-Samskara, or "the five impressions." Another name is Samashrayanam. The individual receives the following:

- Nama Samskara: An initiation 'spiritual' name, such as a name of Vishnu, or one of his devotees (such as Ramanuja), suffixed with the word dasa (meaning "servant," or servant of). Examples of these could be Vishnu dasa or Ramanuja dasa.
- Pundra Samskara: Application of the tiruman, or the Urdhva Pundra, on the forehead and 12 marks on certain parts of the body, which signifies that the individual belongs to Vishnu, and that their bodies, minds, and souls are the temples of Lakshmi-Narayana.
- Thapa Samskara: Special branding on the shoulders of the conch (Panchajanya) and the chakra (Sudarshana) of Vishnu by a guru.
- Yajna Samskara: Learning to perform the archana or puja, or ritual worship, of Lakshmi-Narayana from the guru.
- Mantra Samskara: Learning three special mantras dedicated to Vishnu from the guru.

== Three mantras in Sri Vaishnavism ==
In Sri Vaishnavism, three sacred mantras, understood as rahasya (secrets or mysteries), express the act of saranagati (prapatti), or taking refuge with Narayana and Sri Lakshmi:

- Tiru Mantra: aum namo narayanaya, meaning "Om, praise to Narayana". It expresses the dependence of all beings on Narayana.
- Dvaya Mantra: srimannarayaṇa-caraṇau saranam prapadye, srimate narayanaya namaḥ, meaning "I approach for refuge the feet of Narayana along with Sri; praise to Narayana with Sri". The Dvaya Mantra is recited while taking refuge. According to Vedanta Desika, the Dvaya Mantra identifies Narayana as both the means and the goal of taking refuge.
- Carama Sloka: sarva-dharman parityajya mam ekam saranam vraja aham tvam sarva-papebhyo moksayisyami ma sucah (Bhagavad Gita verse 18.66), meaning "Having completely given up all modes of righteousness, to Me alone come for refuge. From all sins I will free you. Do not grieve." Clooney describes it as a divine invitation to take refuge and live without self-righteousness.

The three mantras emphasize different aspects of saranagati. In Srimad Rahasyatrayasara, Vedanta Desika explains that the Tiru Mantra makes clear the nature of the self and its dependence on God, the Dvaya Mantra explains how to take refuge, and the Carama Sloka instructs the devotee to take refuge.

== Principles ==
=== Sri Vaishnavism ===
In the Sri Vaishnava tradition, the Sharanagati is divided into six principles:

1. Accepting those things that are favorable for devotion to God (anukulyasya sankalpa)
2. Rejecting those things that are averse to surrender to God (pratikulyasya varjanam)
3. Considering God to be one's protector in all circumstances (raksisyatiti visvasa)
4. Accepting God as one's maintainer (goptrtve varanam)
5. Surrendering everything in God's service (atma-niksepa)
6. Cultivating a humble attitude (karpanya)

=== Gaudiya Vaishnavism ===
In the Gaudiya tradition, the Sharanagati is divided into six principles:

1. Ānukūlyasya saṅkalpaḥ – Accepting what is favorable for devotional service (bhakti).
2. Prātikūlyasya varjanam – Rejecting what is unfavorable for bhakti.
3. Rakṣiṣyatīti viśvāsaḥ – Having firm faith that Bhagavān will protect the devotee.
4. Goptṛtve varaṇam – Accepting Bhagavān as one’s sole maintainer.
5. Ātma-nikṣepaḥ – Full surrender of oneself to Bhagavān.
6. Kārpaṇya – Feeling humility and helplessness before Bhagavān.

== Five accessories of taking refuge ==
In Vedanta Desika's Srimad Rahasyatrayasara, five accessories to the act of taking refuge are described:

1. Choosing what is pleasing to God
2. Rejecting what is displeasing to God
3. Acknowledgement of one's helplessness and need
4. Possessing great faith in the power of taking refuge
5. Choosing God as one's protector

== Synonyms ==
In Gitarthasamgraha (a poem on the Bhagavad Gita), wherever Yamunacharya uses the term saranagati, Ramanuja, in his commentary, uses the word prapatti, thus treating the words as synonyms. Ramanuja also introduces samasrayana to denote seeking refuge in the "human form of the deity", such as Krishna. While prapatti and saranagati are used interchangeably to denote refuge in God, samasrayana refers more specifically to refuge in an incarnate, accessible form of God.

== Sources ==
- Raman, Srilata (2007). Raman, Srilata (2007). 'Self Surrender (Prapatti) to God in Sri-Vaishnavism - Tamil Cats & Sanskrit Monkeys'.
