= Nishtha =

Sanskrit word for "devotion"; Hindu philosophical concept

The Sanskrit word Nishtha (निष्ठा), in Hindu philosophy, refers to devotion (a deep sense of belief or spiritual commitment), dedication (strong determination and unwavering focus in pursuit of a goal or duty), discipline (the inner strength to stay consistent and firm in thoughts or actions) and in Bhagavad Gita, and other spiritual texts, Nishtha is often used to refer to unwavering commitment to a way.

== Meaning ==
Nishtha (Sanskrit: निष्ठ or निष्ठा) means – 'being in or on', 'situated on', 'depending or 'resting on', 'referring' or 'relating to', 'devoted or attached to', 'practicing', 'intent on', 'skilled in', 'believing in', 'conducive to', 'effecting', 'position', 'condition', 'state', 'basis', 'foundation', 'fixity', 'fixedness', 'steadiness', 'devotion', 'application', 'close attachment', 'belief', 'firm adherencev, 'faith', 'excellence', 'skill', 'proficiency', 'perfection', conclusion', 'end', 'termination', 'the catastrophe or end of a drama', 'accomplishment', 'contemplation', 'the culminating point', 'death', 'destruction', 'disappearance from the world at the fixed time', 'fixed or certain knowledge', 'certainty', 'begging', 'suffering', 'trouble', 'distress', 'anxiety', 'a technical term for past participial terminations', and is one of the many names of Krishna.

== Philosophical significance ==
On the battle-field of Kurukshetra, Krishna tells Arjuna:

लोकेऽस्मिन् द्विविधा निष्ठा पुरा प्रोक्ता मयाऽनघ |
ज्ञानयोगेन सांख्यानां कर्मयोगेन योगिनाम् ||

"O sinless one! Two kinds of disciplines in this world were set forth by Me in times of yore – for the Samkhyas the discipline of knowledge (Jnana-nishtha), and for the yogins, that of works (Karma-nishtha). " – (Bhagavad Gita III.3)

In his commentary on this sloka, Sankara states – "तत्र का सा द्विविधा निष्ठा इति? आह - What is this two-fold discipline? Listen: (i) The discipline of knowledge (ज्ञानयोग),….(for) the renouncers of the Paramhamsa order who have established themselves in the ultimate Reality, and (ii) The discipline of works (कर्मयोग)…. (for) the performers of works…the discipline of works may promote life’s ends by endowing the agent with the fitness to adopt the discipline of knowledge, and not independently, by itself, whereas the discipline of knowledge, generated by that of works, is totally independent means to life’s supreme end." In this Sloka, the word Nishtha means ‘devoted to’, ‘established in’. Faith with trust and dedication is called shraddha; faith with trust and confidence is nishtha, in this sloka, Krishna speaks about the twofold path of faith and confidence. Self-knowledge (atma jnana) can exist when self-knowledge is not fully established; Jnana-nishtha refers to self-knowledge that is fully assimilated and established.

Sanatkumara tells Narada (Chandogya Upanishad VII.xx.1 and VII.xxi.1) that when one serves devotedly, then one becomes endowed with faith; without serving devotedly one does not acquire faith, and that when one acts, then one serves devotedly. The word Nishtha or 'devotion', appearing in the former passage, is used to mean - 'steadiness'. Even though the text says nothing about a teacher, to Sankara it indicates the steadfast seeking of a teacher’s wisdom for acquiring knowledge of Brahman; and to Prabhavananda it indicates gain of faith by attending on a teacher. Sankara states – A distinction has been made between Jnana-nishtha (ज्ञान-निष्ठा) and Karma-nishtha (कर्म-निष्ठा).Vedic works are intended for him only who has desires; the renunciation of these works is enjoined on him who seeks only the Self. To Vivekananda the word Nishtha meant –'singleness of attachment'; he states –" That singleness of attachment (Nishtha) to a loved object, without which no genuine love can grow, is very often also the cause of the denunciation of everything else. "

== Grammatical significance ==
Sutra I.i.26 of Pāṇini in his Ashtadhyayi defines Nishta in Sukta I.i.26 which reads - क्तक्तवतू निष्ठा – that the affixes of the Past Participles - kta and katavatu, are called Nishtha. In this text, Panini in accordance with the context of their use and application expounds and explains many rules relating to the duplication and reduplication of many words. The actual affixes are त, तवत्, the क and उ being indicatory; they being कित् are liable to कित् affixes such as - कृतः, कृतवान्, भुक्तः, भुक्तवान्, in accordance with rule I.i.5, the force of indicatory उ to indicate that in forming the feminine of nouns ending in an affix having an indicatory vowel of uk pratyahara – उ, ऋ, लृ ङीप् (ई) must be added such as – कृतवत् (masculine), कृतवती (feminine).

When the nishta follows (निष्ठावान्) there is vocalization such as in the case of वचिस्वपियजादिनां किति (VI.1.15) – The semivowels of the roots वच्, स्वप् and यजादि verbs are vocalized when followed by an affix having an indicatory क; thus with the Past Participle क्त and क्तवतु, उक्तः, उक्तवान्; सुप्तः, सुप्तवान्; इष्टः, इष्टवान्; or as in the case of सत्यः पूर्वस्य (VI.1.23) – The verb स्त्या (स्त्यै and ष्ठ्यै) when preceded by प्र changes its semivowel to vowel, when a nishtha affix follows, प्रस्तीतः or प्रस्तीतवान् ||, then, त is optionally changed to न as प्रस्तीनः and प्रस्तीनवान् ||.The substitute of the nishtha is considered siddha or 'effective' when applying rules relating to the change of letter to प, to accent, to affix and to the addition of the augment इट्. The rule - श्वीदितः निष्ठायाम् (VII.2.14) states that when following the verbal root श्वि or any root which has ईकारः as a इत्, a निष्ठा does not take the augment इट्.

== Miscellany ==
The logo of Delhi University and Delhi Sarvakalāshālā is - निष्ठा धृतिः सत्यम्, meaning - "Reverent dedication grasps the truth".
