= Para Tattva =

Sanskrit term for Supreme Truth

Para Tattva (Sanskrit: पर तत्त्व) is a Sanskrit phrase meaning “Supreme Truth,” as studied, realised, worshipped and revealed by the saints of India's Vedic tradition.

Presently, two very common conceptions among the students of the Vedas are the Hindu tattva's of Paramatman and Brahman, which may be understood respectively as the witness-consciousness (Self as knower) and the Super soul (super controlling Godhead).

== Name ==
The root "tat" is equivalent to the English word “that,” while the suffix "-tva" is used like suffix “-ness,” giving a sense of “that-ness,” commonly understood as truth or principle. "Para" is simply “supreme,” “transcendental” or “absolute,” in this context describing the principles of truth in a wholesome context.

== Brahmana View ==
Those Brahmanas who tend to be theonomous (governed by god) in nature but who relate to Deity more as the absolute Self in its wise or gnostic capacity may be called Brahma-vadis, meaning practitioners of Brahma-vada and the endorsement of Brahma-tattva.

== Paramatma View ==
Brahmanas and Yogis who are more progressively theolatrous, whether exoterically or esoterically, may be called Paramatma-vadis. Their relationship with the Deity advances beyond theoretical knowledge of Self into the dynamics of absolute civilization. Their practice of cosmic consciousness comprehends ontological relationships between the Witness which is the relatively inferior Self and the super-controlling Godhead, attunement with Whom is the prime requirement for entrance into the Kingdom of Heaven. They are concerned with absolute functionality.

== Vaishnava View ==
The Vaishnava school of Vedic theology emphasizes a third significant phase of Para Tattva beyond Brahman and Paramatma. They claim that the real goal of a theistic saint is the Supreme Personality of Godhead, known as Bhagavan. Where Brahma-tattva tends to be perception oriented and Paramatma-tattva, the tattva of Bhagavan expands into explorations of quality, including and especially the superlative quality of glory which is the feature that reveals the Kingdom of Heaven, known to the Vaishnavas as Vaikuntha.

== Qualities of Bhagavan ==
Once Bhagavan is recognized, reality may be comprehended sixfold, according to six essential qualities of divine personality.

The first quality is glory, represented by Rama.

The second quality is strength, represented by Shiva.

The third quality is wisdom or knowledge is personified by Brahma.

The fourth quality is beauty, represented by Krishna.

The fifth quality of Bhagavan is detachment and is represented by Sudarshana, Vishnu's weapon.

The sixth and final quality is possession, represented by Chaitanya.
