= Vishishtadvaita =

Vedanta school of Hindu philosophy

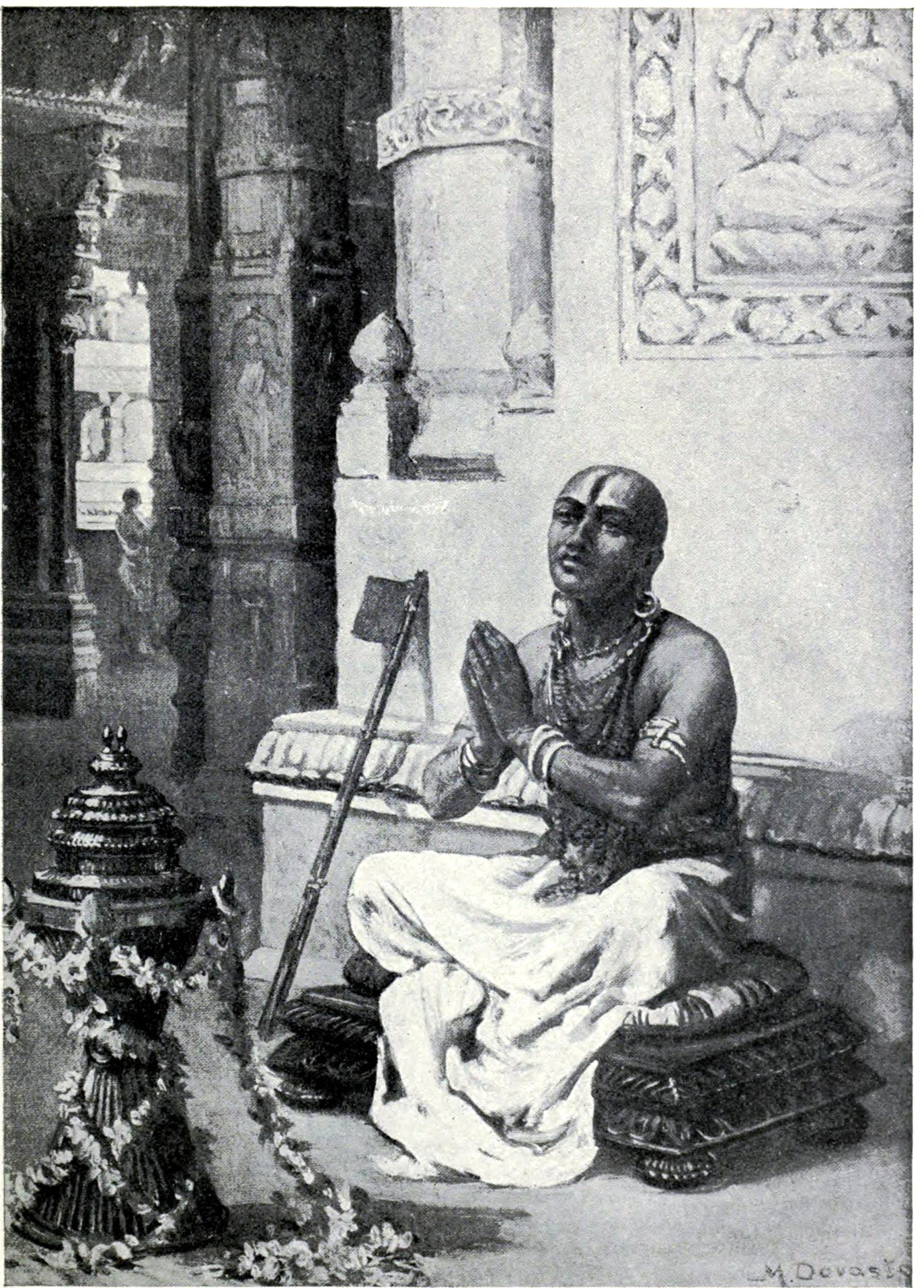
Ramanujacharya, who propounded the philosophy of Vishitadvaita Vedanta

Vishishtadvaita (IAST Viśiṣṭādvaita; Sanskrit: विशिष्टाद्वैत) is a school of Hindu philosophy belonging to the Vedanta tradition. Vishishta Advaita means "non-duality with distinctions" and recognises Brahman (ब्रह्म) as the primordial quality while also acknowledging its existential multiplicity. This philosophy can be characterised as a form of qualified monism, or a qualified non-dualism. It upholds the belief that all diversity ultimately stems from a fundamental underlying unity.

According to Vishishtadvaita vedanta, Vishnu (Narayana) is Brahman (Param Brahman), Supreme Lord (Ishvara), Supreme Person (Paramatman) and has noble attributes such as omniscience, omnipotence, omnipresence, and omnibenevolence. The universe depends upon God (Ishvara) for its being as well as for its qualities.

Ramanuja, the 11–12th century philosopher and the main proponent of Vishishtadvaita philosophy, contends that the Prasthanatrayi ("The three sources"), namely the Upanishads, the Bhagavad Gita, and the Brahma Sutras are to be interpreted in a way that shows this unity in diversity, for any other way would violate their consistency. Vedanta Desika, another major scholar who significantly helped expand the philosophy of Vishishtadvaita, defines Vishishtadvaita using the statement, Aseṣa Chit-Achit Prakāram Brahmaikameva Tatvam: Brahman, as qualified by the sentient and insentient modes (or attributes), is the Ultimate reality.

== History ==
The earliest Vishishtadvaita works are no longer available. However, the earliest philosophers who are thought to have developed the system are named in Ramanuja's Vedarthasamgraha: Bodhayana, Dramida, Tanka, Guhadeva, Kapardi, and Bharuci.

Bodhayana is considered to have written an extensive vritti (commentary) on the Purva and Uttara Mimamsas. Tanka is attributed with having written commentaries on Chandogya Upanishad and Brahma Sutras. Nathamuni of the ninth century AD, the foremost acharya of the Sri Vaishnavas, compiled the Naalayira Divya Prabandham which were the divine songs of alwars sung on the Supreme Lord Srimannarayana. Yamunacharya renounced kingship and spent his last days in the service of the deity at Srirangam. He lay the fundamentals of Vishishtadvaita by writing four basic works on the subject.

Ramanuja is the main proponent of Vishishtadvaita. He continues along the line of thought of his predecessors while expounding the knowledge expressed in the Upanishads, the Brahma Sutras, and the Bhagavad Gita. Vedanta Desika and Pillai Lokacharya, disciples in the tradition of Ramanuja, had minor disagreements not on the philosophy, but on some aspects of the theology, giving rise to the Vadakalai and Tenkalai schools of thought. The traditional lineage of teachers of Vishishtadvaita all have direct links to the view Vedanta Desika established.

== Etymology ==
The word vishishtadvaita is formed from two elements: viśiṣṭa (विशिष्ट), meaning "qualified" or "distinguished", and advaita (अद्वैत), meaning "non-duality". Grammatically, the term is analyzed as a tatpurusha (determinative) compound that embeds an itaretara dvandva (coordinative compound) as its prior member. In this interpretation, two qualified principles, Brahman and the universe of chit (sentient beings) and achit (insentient matter), are first paired in a dvandva compound (viśiṣṭe) derived from viśiṣṭaṃ ca viśiṣṭaṃ ca ("the qualified and the qualified"). This compound then forms the first member of a ṣaṣṭhī-tatpuruṣa compound with advaita, expressing the relationship "the non-duality of those two" (tayoḥ advaitam). Thus, Viśiṣṭādvaita literally means "the non-duality of the two qualified principles", signifying the philosophical doctrine that a single, non-dual reality, Brahman, exists but is internally qualified by the distinct and real modes of chit and achit.

== Key principles ==
According to P. N. Srinivasachari, there are three key principles of Vishishtadvaita which are laid out in the Vedarthasangraha by Ramanuja:

- Tattva: The knowledge of the three real entities, namely jiva (living souls, the sentient), ajiva (the nonsentient) and Ishvara (Vishnu-Narayana or Parabrahman, Supreme-self and the cause of all manifestations and in-dwelling giver of grace based on Karma).
- Hita: The identification of the means of attaining Brahman. Srinivasachari further adds that 'hita' is the performance of 'one's duty as a Brahmarpana'.
- Purushartha: The goal to be attained, as moksha or liberation from bondage.

== Epistemology ==
=== Pramanas ===
Pramana ("sources of knowledge", Sanskrit) refers to factual knowledge obtained through reasoning of any object.

In Vishishtadvaita Vedanta, only the following three pramanas are accepted as valid means of knowledge:

- Pratyaksa – knowledge gained through perception. Perception in this context generally refers to sensory perception. In modern-day usage, this will also include knowledge obtained by means of observation through scientific instruments, since they are considered an extension of perception.
- Anumana – knowledge gained through inference. Inference refers to deductive reasoning and analysis.
- Shabda – knowledge gained by means of shruti and smriti. Shruti refers to knowledge gained from scriptures—primarily the Upanishads, the Brahma Sutras, and smriti refers to the Bhagavad Gita, Bhagavatam, Mahabharatam and Ramayana.

== Metaphysics ==
=== Ontology ===
Vishishtadvaita ontology outlines three entities: Chit (sentient beings), achit (insentient entities), and Ishvara (Parabrahman):

==== Chit ====
In Vishishtadvaita, chit is synonymous with jiva and atman. Chit includes all beings with sentience, consciousness, and individual self-awareness. A jiva has both knowledge as its nature and is a knower. This is likened to a flame which illuminates itself and other objects It is similar to the Purusha of Samkhya system.

There are three types of jivas:

1. Nitya: eternally free jivas who were never bound in samsara
2. Mukta: jivas previously in samsara, but now free
3. Baddha: jivas bound in samsara

Characteristics of the jiva include:

- Being indivisible.
- Being the agent of action and enjoyer of its results
- Being infinite in number and different from each other

==== Achit ====
Achit is the world of insentient entities as denoted by matter or, more specifically, the non-conscious Universe. It is similar to the Prakriti of the Samkhya system.

There are three achit entities.

1. Prakrti: primordial cosmic matter and everything that evolves from it. For example, the material world.
2. Nitya-vibhuti: transcendental spiritual universe
3. Kala: time

==== Ishvara ====
Ishvara is identified with Vishnu (Narayana). According to the tradition, Ishvara maintains control over the universe and all sentient beings, which together form the pan-organistic body of Ishvara. The triad of Ishvara, the universe, and the sentient beings constitutes Brahman, signifying the completeness of existence. Ishvara is described as Parabrahman endowed with numerous auspicious qualities (Kalyana Gunas). According to Ramanuja's theology, Ishvara is perfect, omniscient, omnipresent, incorporeal, independent, the creator of the universe, its active ruler, and its eventual destroyer. He is causeless, eternal, and unchangeable, yet serves as both the material and efficient cause of the universe and sentient beings. He is both immanent, like whiteness in milk, and transcendent, like a watch-maker independent of a watch. He is the subject of worship, the basis of morality and the giver of the fruits of karma. He rules the world with Maya, his divine power.

===== Antaryamin =====
The inner controller (antar-yāmin) is the thread connecting everything, governing this world, the next, and all beings from within (Brihadaranyaka Upanishad 3.7.3-23).

"He who inhabits water, yet is within water, whom water does not know, whose body water is and who controls water from within – He is your Self, the Inner Controller, the Immortal."

"He who inhabits the sun, yet is within the sun, whom the sun does not know, whose body the sun is and who controls the sun from within – He is your Self, the Inner Controller, the Immortal" – Brihadaranyaka Upanishad 3.7.4–14

===== Brahman =====
There is a subtle difference between Ishvara and Brahman. Ishvara is the substantive part of Brahman, while Jivas and jagat are its modes (also secondary attributes), and kalyana-gunas (auspicious attributes) are the primary attributes. The secondary attributes become manifested in the effect state when the world is differentiated by name and form. The kalyana-gunas are eternally manifest.

Brahman is the description of Ishvara when comprehended in fullness—i.e., a simultaneous vision of Ishvara with all his modes and attributes.

Cit and acit are completely dependent on Brahman. The following examples illustrate the relationship between Brahman and jivas:

- shariri/sharira (soul/body);
- dravya/guna (substance/attribute);
- aṃsi/aṃsa (whole/part);
- visayi/visaya (subject/object);
- angi/angā (organism/organs);

These relationships can be experienced holding Brahman as the father, son, mother, sister, wife, husband, friend, lover and lord. Hence, Brahman is a personal being.

- What does Nirguna Brahman mean?

Ramanuja argues vehemently against understanding Brahman as one without attributes. Brahman is Nirguna in the sense that impure qualities do not touch it. He provides three valid reasons for making such a claim:

Shabda Pramana: All shrutis, smritis and shabdas denoting Brahman always list either attributes inherent to Brahman or not inherent to Brahman. The shrutis only seek to deny Brahman from possessing impure and defective qualities, which affect the world of beings. There is evidence in the shrutis in this regard. The shrutis proclaim Brahman to be beyond the tri-gunas, which are observed. However, Brahman possesses an infinite number of transcendental attributes, the evidence of which is given in vakhyas like "satyam jnanam anantam Brahma" (Taittiriya Upanishad).

Pratyaksha Pramana: Ramanuja states that "a contentless cognition is impossible". And all cognition must necessarily involve knowing Brahman through the attributes of Brahman.

Anumana Pramana: Ramanuja states that "Nirgunatva" itself becomes an attribute of Brahman on account of the uniqueness of no other entity being Nirguna. Ramanuja had simplified the relationship between Brahman and soul. According to him, though the soul (Atman) is an integral part of Brahman, it has independent existence.

=== Causality ===
Like the Samkhya system, Vishishtadvaita upholds the theory of Satkaryavada as opposed to Asatkaryavada. Per satkaryavada, effects are not new entities, but modifications of the cause.

The Vishishtadvaita theory is called Brahma-parinama-vada, with "parinama-vada" meaning the evolution of the effect from the cause. Brahman is both the cause and the effect, but the underlying entity is the same in all forms.

Brahman is a cause in two ways:

1. Instrumental (nimitta) cause: For example, a goldsmith is the instrumental cause of the jewelery they make.
2. Material cause (upādāna): For example, gold is the material cause of the jewelery.

According to Vishishtadvaita, the Universe and sentient beings always exist. However, they begin from a subtle state and transform. The subtle state is called a causal state, while the transformed state is called the effect state. The causal state is when Brahman is internally not distinguishable by name and form.

It can be said that Vishishtadvaita follows Brahma-Prakara-Parinama Vada. That is to say, it is the modes (Jivas and Jagat) of Brahman which is under evolution. The cause and effect only refer to the pan-organistic body transformation. Brahman, as the Universal Self, is unchanging and eternal.

Brahman, having the subtle (sūkṣma) chit and achit entities as his Śarīra/Prakāra(body/mode) before manifestation, is the same Brahman having the expanded (sthūla) chit and achit entities as Śarīra/Prakāra(body/mode) after manifestation.

== Soteriology ==
The purpose or goal of human existence is called purushartha. According to the Vedas, there are four goals namely artha (wealth), kama (pleasure), dharma (righteousness) and moksha (permanent freedom from worldly bondage). According to this philosophy, the first three goals are not an end by themselves but need to be pursued with the ideal of attaining moksha.

=== Moksha (Liberation) ===
Moksha means liberation or release from samsara, the cycle of rebirth. According to this tradition, the baddha (bounded) jiva is self-aware but exists in a state of ignorance regarding the sharira-shariri relationship. Karma, accumulated over countless births and deaths in samsara, prevents the jiva from attaining dharma-bhuta-jnana (attributive consciousness) of God. Through the process of creation by Isvara, the jiva evolves through different bodies until it attains a human form. In this form, the jiva can strive to understand its true nature and gain knowledge of God through bhakti. With divine grace, the jiva then attains a liberated state. Liberation means gaining true knowledge of God and serving God in Vaikuntha (God's abode). The liberated jiva retains its individuality and possesses infinite knowledge and bliss comaparable to Brahman, but doesn't become one with Brahman. Unlike Advaita, liberation in Vishishtadvaita is only after death (videhamukti). There is no concept of jivanmukti, or liberation while living.

The Vadakalai school accepts the importance of God's grace in gaining liberation alongside individual effort, similar to how a baby monkey must hold onto its mother. The Tenkalai school sees God's grace as the only requirement for liberation, similar to how a cat will carry a kitten without any effort from the kitten.

=== Bhakti as the means of attaining moksha ===
Bhakti is the sole means of liberation in Vishishtadvaita. Through Bhakti (devotion), a Jiva ascends to Vaikuntha, where it continues to delight in His service in a body which is sat-cit-ananda. Karma Yoga and Jnana Yoga are sub-processes of Bhakti, total surrender, as the devotee acquires the knowledge that the deity is the inner self. A devotee realises his own state as dependent on, supported by, and led by the deity, who is the Master. One is to lead a life as an instrument of the deity, offering all his thought, word, and deed to the feet of the deity. One is to see the deity in everything and everything in Him. This is the unity in diversity achieved through devotion.

Ramanuja accepts Sharanagati, total surrender at the Lord's lotus feet, as the sole means to moksha. Wherein, moksha is defined as liberation from samsara and going to Vaikuntha to serve Narayana (Balaji) in a spiritual body. This is a distinguishing feature of this school of philosophy, as both Adi Shankara's Advaita and Madhvacharya's Dvaita accept bhakti for two different concepts of moksha. Ramanuja has supported this opinion with various citations directly from the Vedas, and various incidents that highlight sharanagati as a means to attain personal stay in the realm of Vaikuntha. Observing total surrender at the Lord's feet guarantees moksha at the end of this birth, and in the time between sharanagati and death, the surrendered soul must spend his time performing the nine forms of devotion.

== Traditions following Vishishtadvaita ==
- Sri Vaishnava Sampradaya of southern India
- Sri Ramanandi Sect of Northern India, it has the largest monastic order in whole India
- Dāmodariya Vaiśņava sampradaya of Assam
- Swaminarayan sampradaya of Gujarat

== Relationship with other traditions ==
=== Lakshmivishishtadvaita ===
Vishishtadvaita and Lakshmivishishtadvaita share core foundational elements as both are prominent schools of qualified non-dualism within the Vaishnava tradition. Lakshmivishishtadvaita is the primary philosophy of the Vaikhanasa school authored by sages like Srinivasa Dikshitar. Both systems identify the Supreme Brahman as a personal God endowed with infinite auspicious attributes. This Supreme Being is worshipped as Sriman Narayana (Lord Vishnu). Both Vishishtadvaita and Lakshmivishishtadvaita strongly agree that Purvamimamsa and Uttaramimamsa constitute a single, unified text (Ekashastra).

=== Shuddhadvaita ===
Vishishtadvaita and Shuddhadvaita are both crucial monistic, yet highly devotional, schools of Vedanta within the Vaishnava tradition. Shuddhadvaita was propounded by Sri Vallabhacharya. Both systems define the highest reality as a Personal God possessed of infinite auspicious attributes. Vishishtadvaita worships this Supreme Lord as Sriman Narayana (Vishnu), while Shuddhadvaita focuses on His absolute form as Lord Krishna (Purushottama).Both Vishishtadvaita and Shuddhadvaita share a deeply integrated approach toward the Vedas, firmly holding that purvamimamsa and Uttaramimamsa constitute a single, continuous, and unified scripture (Ekashastra)

=== Advaita Vedanta ===
Vishishtadvaita developed in critical dialogue with Advaita Vedanta, the non-dualistic school systematized by Adi Shankara. While both traditions accept the authority of the Upanishads, Brahma Sutras, and Bhagavad Gita, they differ fundamentally in their interpretation. Ramanuja critiqued Advaita's concept of nirguna Brahman (Brahman without attributes), arguing that a contentless cognition is impossible and that the Upanishads describe Brahman as possessing infinite auspicious qualities (kalyana gunas). He also rejected the Advaita doctrine of maya as an inexplicable cosmic illusion, maintaining instead that the world of sentient and insentient beings is real and constitutes the body of Brahman. While Advaita posits ultimate liberation as the realization of identity with Brahman (jivanmukti), Vishishtadvaita upholds liberation as the soul's eternal service to God in Vaikuntha after death (videhamukti).

=== Dvaita Vedanta ===
Madhvacharya's Dvaita (dualistic) school, which emerged after Ramanuja, similarly rejected Advaita but adopted a stronger ontological separation between God, soul, and world. While Vishishtadvaita maintains a qualified non-dualism where souls and matter are real but inseparable modes of Brahman, Dvaita asserts five eternal and real distinctions (bheda): between God and the soul, God and matter, soul and matter, one soul and another, and one material entity and another. Both traditions share a personalistic theism centered on Vishnu as the supreme being, acceptance of bhakti as the means to liberation, and belief in a distinct afterlife in Vaikuntha. Vishishtadvaita's doctrine of the soul as sharira (body) of Brahman represents a relationship between God and the individual than Dvaita's dualistic framework permits.

=== Shaiva Siddhanta ===
Vishishtadvaita shares structural similarities with Shaiva Siddhanta, a school of Shaiva theology from South India. Both are realist, pluralistic Vedanta traditions that accept the reality of God, souls, and the world while maintaining God's supreme independence. Both traditions articulate a "body-soul" (sharira-shariri bhav) relationship between God and souls, and both emphasize grace as essential for liberation. However, Shaiva Siddhanta identifies the supreme reality with Shiva rather than Vishnu, and its metaphysical framework draws more directly from Shaiva Agamas than from the Vedanta Sutras.

=== Vaishnava traditions ===
Within Vaishnavism, Vishishtadvaita forms the philosophical foundation of the Sri Vaishnava Sampradaya. It has also influenced the Ramanandi (Ramavat) tradition of North India, which adopts qualified non-dualistic metaphysics in its understanding of Rama as the supreme Brahman. The Swaminarayan Sampradaya of Gujarat similarly traces its philosophical lineage to Vishishtadvaita, though it incorporates distinctive theological emphases. While these traditions share the qualified non-dualistic framework, they differ in their chosen deity (Rama or Krishna versus Vishnu), scriptural canons, and ritual practices.

=== Buddhism and Jainism ===
Ramanuja's commentaries contain sustained polemics against Buddhist and Jain schools. He rejected the Buddhist doctrine of momentariness (kshanikavada), arguing that it undermines moral responsibility and the continuity required for liberation. Against the Jain theory of anekantavada (many-sidedness), Ramanuja maintained that scripture provides determinate knowledge of a single supreme reality. These critiques established Vishishtadvaita's position within the broader Vedantic defense against non-Vedic traditions in medieval India.

== See also ==
- Turiya
- Achintya Bheda Abheda
- Virashaivism
- Shiva Advaita
- Suddhadvaita
- Dvaitadvaita

== Sources ==
- Chari, S. M. Srinivasa (2000). Vaiṣṇavism: Its Philosophy, Theology, and Religious Discipline. Motilal Banarsidass Publishing House. ISBN 81-208-1098-8.
