= Satani (caste) =

Temple servant community in south India

- Two members of the Satani community in Pondichéry, c. 1890–1902

Regions with significant populations
- South India; Andhra Pradesh, Telangana, Tamil Nadu, Karnataka, Maharashtra, Odisha, Gujarat

Languages
- Telugu, Tamil, Kannada, Odia, Marathi, Gujarati

Satani is a community that renders temple services in the states of Andhra Pradesh, Karnataka, Gujarat, Maharashtra, Odisha, Tamil Nadu and Telangana in India. Traditionally, they rendered a variety of services as supervisors and purohits of temples, guardians of temple properties, heralds, singers and torch-bearers at festivals, bodyguards of Jiyars, and providers of umbrellas, flower garlands, and namam clay. They have claimed Brahmin status, although this has been contested by Brahmins as they do not wear the sacred thread and they do not study or chant/recite Sanskrit Vedas or Gayatri Mantra, but they study and recite only Naalayira Divya Prabandham written by Alvars. They are currently included in the Other Backward Classes (OBC) list by the central and state governments.

== Etymology ==
The name 'Satani' may be a corruption of 'chyatani' or 'chyati' which means "acting according to prescribed rites". Satani is also said to be the shortened form of Sattadavan/Satanivadu, meaning the uncovered man or the one who does not wear the sacred thread. They are prohibited from covering three different parts of their bodies, viz., the head with Sikha, the body with the sacred thread, and the waist with the customary strip of cloth.

== History ==
In social and religious customs, the Satani community is associated with the Tenkalai movement and have a long history from the time of Ramanuja and Guru-lineages and literature dating, from, at least the 15th century. They follow the egalitarian anti-caste Alvars/Bhagavata Vaishnavism formalized by Pillai Lokacharya and Manavala Mamunigal. Many follow a lifestyle (diet, dress, household appointments, and marriage considerations) that are strongly similar to that of the Tenkalai Iyengars. Their names have the honorary suffix Ayyangar, the title acharya, swamy, alwar, alvar, iah, iyya and the ayya honorific. They give special honour to the servants and insignia of Vishnu; considering themselves "servants of the servants" (Dasanudasa) of the lord and revere Hanuman, Garuda, Chakra, Panchajanya and Naamam. Above all, they honour the Alvars, especially Nammalvar, and recite the Alvar's hymns for domestic rituals. Most have received their initiation (Panca-samskara) from the Koil Annan Acharya lineage of Kantatai Ramauja mutt at Srirangam, Vanamamalai Mutt at Nanguneri and Paravastu Mutt at Tirupati.

From the eleventh through the sixteenth centuries, Satanis enjoyed a supervisory status in many of the most important temples at Srirangam, Kanchipuram, Tirumala-Tirupati, and Melkote. In the sixteenth century during Saluva Narasimha Deva Raya's time, they were attached to Kandadai Ramanuja Ayyangar, a powerful acharyapurusha whose influence extended to the different temple centers and controlled the feeding houses or Ramanujakutam at Venkateswara Temple, Tirumala. They enjoyed numerous privileges and made donations in the name of their preceptor. Nevertheless, in the later period, when the influence of Kandadai was diminished, the Satanis do not appear to have enjoyed the same status.

== Origin ==
Their origin is unclear. According to one of the hagiographies, their guru lineage is from Nammalvar to Ramanuja to Manavala Mamunigal to Srimat Paravastu Kantopayantru Munindra Jiyar who firmly established their order. They were Vadama Brahmins who accepted the Divya Prabandham and stood in the ancient Parama Ekanta tradition of those who have renounced all associations by giving up their Sikha and sacred thread. Ramanuja assigned Satanis to teach the Tamil Vedas to non-Brahmins and to take care of the worship of the lord in shrines and temples. Hence, the term 'Satani' arose as a battle for temple control between vaidika and non-vaidika traditions. Other sources indicate that they are descendants of mixed origin of both Brahmins and non-Brahmins while some others indicate that they were shudras since they do not wear the sacred thread nor do they have Sanskrit Vedas. Some sources indicate them to be followers of Chaitanya Mahaprabhu of Gaudiya Sampradaya and his discipline Sanatana Goswami.

== Variations ==
In the past, they were called Sattadamudhali's at Srirangam, and Sattada Ekaki at Tirupati. In recent times, they are called Ayyawar, Chatani, Chatali, Chattada, Sattadavar purohitar, Vighas, Vira and Vishnu archaka in Andhra Pradesh, Satvik Vaishnava in Karnataka, Satani Vaishnavulu in Maharashtra and Dasa-Nambi, Kovil Padagar, Kovil Thurayar, Sathata aiyyar, Satanaiah, Chattadi Sathtavar and Sattadas in Tamil Nadu. But, these names seem to have irritated them and they took pains to cast them off and preferred to be called as Prathama (First/Original) or Nambi Venkatapura Vaishnavas, latter name associating them with Tirupati and according to present day Venkatapura Sri Vaishnavas at Melkote, a Brahmin community.

== Social status ==
Satanis enjoyed greater status in temple service in the times past than they do today. In the course of time, given the weight of vaidika traditions and the slackening of Vijayanagara Empire patronage, Satanis who were never considered the equal of vaidika Brahmins lost ground. However, they protected themselves from total annihilation by becoming a caste along with all the others, albeit relatively prestigious. Privileges have been canceled or at least eroded. Srirangam Sattadas recited alongside others in the Iyal Gosti up to 1942 when the privilege was cut off by legal action. The number of temples served by them has significantly declined in recent times. Their population in Srirangam was much larger in the past as some have left to serve other temples and some have sought a livelihood outside of temple service. Till the 16th century, Satanis had a significant share in the temple authorities, however, it was almost erased from the delineation of the past when histories were written.

In a few major temples, Satanis receive prasada ahead of certain Brahmins. They also receive high honors on special occasions such as Vaikuntha Ekadashi at major temples. In the 1931 Census Report for Mysore stated that "the request that the name Satani to be changed to Sattada Sri Vaishnava could not be accepted because Sri Vaishnava is the name of a distinctive group of Brahmins and Satani community is not generally treated as a Brahmin community. The adoption of the new name could be misleading." They are currently included in the Other Backward Classes (OBC) list by the central and state governments.

== See also ==
- Divya Prabhandham
- Manavala Mamunigal
- Hindu reform movements
