= Chinna Jeeyar =

Indian religious guru and yogi ascetic

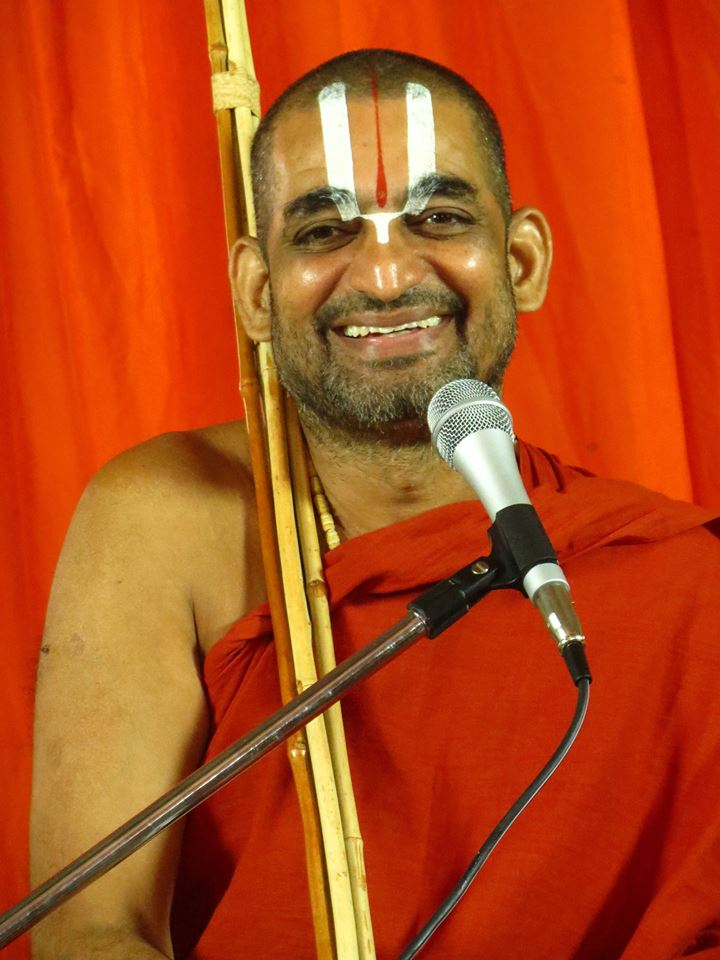

Personal life
- Born: Akulamannada Chilakamarri Sriman Narayana Charyulu; 3 November 1956 (age 69) Arthamuru, East Godavari district, Andhra Pradesh, India
- Parents: Akulamannada Chilakamarri Venkatacharyulu (father); Akulamannada Chilakamarri Alivelu Manga Thayaru (mother)
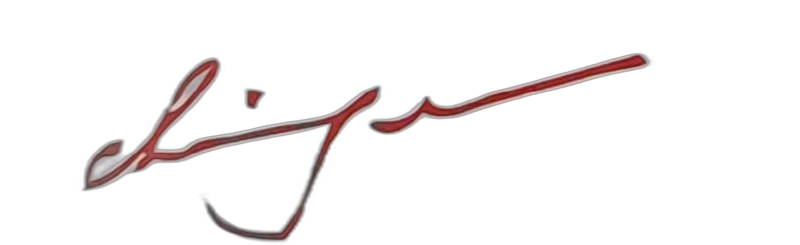
- Signature
- Website: chinnajeeyar.org

Religious life
- Religion: Hinduism
- Denomination: Vaishnavism
- Order: Jeeyar (Lion)
- Philosophy: Vishishtadvaita
- School: Vedanta
- Sect: Andhra Vaishnavas, Sri Vaishnavism; Thenkalai

Religious career
- Teacher: Pedda Jeeyar
- Awards: Padma Bhushan

Chinna Jeeyar (born 3 November 1956), more formally known as Sri Tridandi Srimannarayana Ramanuja Chinna Jeeyar Swami, is a Thenkalai Sri Vaishnava Indian religious guru and yogi ascetic known for his spiritual discourses and the propagation of Ramanuja Vishishtadvaita darshana. He operates spiritual centers in India and the US. He is the designer and planner of the Statue of Equality, a statue dedicated to Ramanujacharya, in Hyderabad, India. Recently, he has also unveiled the Statue of Union, a 90 ft statue of Hanuman, located in Sugar Land, Texas, in the United States. He has also guided the Telangana State Government in the renovation of Yadadri Temple. He is one of the few Jiyars who accepts disciples irrespective of their castes.

== Early life ==
Chinna Jeeyar Swami was born in Arthmuru near Rajahmundry, Andhra Pradesh, in a traditional Telugu Vedic family. His grandfather, Tridandi Srimannarayana Ramanuja Jeeyar, also known as Pedda Jeeyar Swami, mentored him and he was educated and trained by several scholars in Sri Vaishnava Sampradaya. He mastered many Telugu language, Sanskrit and Tamil works and other Hindu scriptures, including Vedas, Puranas, Itihasa and Naalayira Divya Prabandham. At the age of 23, he took the oath to become a Sannyasi. In 1981, after the death of H. H. Pedda Jeeyar Swamiji, he assumed leadership and became the head of Srimad Ubhaya Vedantha Acharya Peetam, Nadigaddapalem.

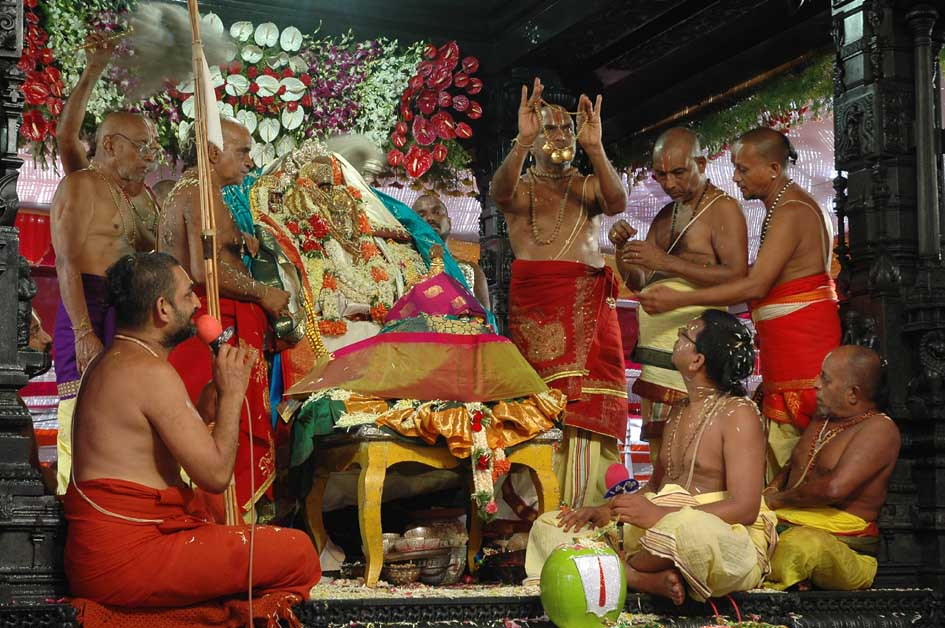
Chinna Jeeyar at Sri Sitarama Thirukalyana Mahotsavam Celebrations at Sita Ramachandraswamy temple, Bhadrachalam (Telangana) in 2011

== Later life ==
Chinna Jeeyar Swami founded the Jeeyar Educational Trust (JET), with branches in places such as Hyderabad, Chennai, and the United States, to help educate students in Vedic tradition. His schools are open to everyone. In addition, he is known for his performance of Vedic rituals of peace and harmony. He speaks multiple languages and provides religious discourses in simple words. He has performed thousands of Samashrayana. His understanding of kainkarya includes modern social services such as schools for tribals and homes for the elderly, orphans, handicapped and destitute. Further, he supports rural development, science and technology schools as well as the introduction of computers for the study of Vedas. He has been visiting the United States since 1994, where he taught a large number of people and spread the teachings of Sri Vaishnavism. He has also performed Yajnas in United States, London, Singapore, Hong Kong, and Canada.

In December 2013, Jeeyar endorsed the Akhil Bhartiya Vidyarthi Parishad (ABVP) student organization for instilling patriotism in students and encouraging them to learn about Indian culture. He claimed Indian culture would remain unchanged if students are acquainted with a comprehensive understanding of the country's history. He expressed the view that students play a critical role in a country's development. Jeeyar was invited by the Government of Andhra Pradesh to assist in organizing the Godavari Maha Pushkaram (river festivals) in July 2015. He has spoken at the United Nations about Sustainable Development Goals.

== Awards ==
- 2023 – Padma Bhushan by Government of India
