= Andhra Vaishnavas =

Hindu Brahmin Community in south India

Andhra Vaishnavas is a Brahmin community in the Indian states of Andhra Pradesh and Telangana who follow Ramanuja Vishishtadvaita Vedanta Darshana and profess Sri Vaishnavism.

== History ==
Andhra Vaishnavas were formerly Smarta Brahmins who converted under the influence of Ramanujacharya and later Sri Vaishnava acharyas. Sri Vaishnavas generally speak Tamil, however, Andhra Vaishnavas are Telugu-speaking.

Orthodox Sri Vaishnavas are exclusive and hold that they co-existed as a separate caste of Brahmins with the Smarthas. They seceded from Smarthas only after Ramanuja's teachings. Their ranks were swollen by frequent additions from others. Andhra Vaishnavas form a single distinct sect and are not divided into the Vadakalai and Tenkalai denominations, unlike the Tamil Iyengars coreligionists. Their practices are similar to Tenkalai denomination as they follow Tenkalai Sri Vaishnava mutts of Tirukoilur Emperumanar Jiyar mutt, Yathiraja Jiyar mutt and Tirupati Ramanuja Jiyar mutt.

== Subsects ==
Andhra Vaishnavas are sub-divided into two subsects, one entirely following the acharams of Tamil Iyengars and the other retaining those of the Telugu Smarthas. They are also called Pancharatra Sri Vaishnava as they follow Pancharatra agama.

== Sri Vaishnavism in Andhra Desa ==
Inscriptions, coins, and literary works suggest Vishnu worship date to at least 230 BC. It extended its domain to Andhra Desa in early 1000 AD, under the patronage of early local rulers such as Telugu Chodas. It received an impetus in the Palnadu region during the Haihayas regime, and its Chief Minister, Brahmanayudu. Vaishnavism underwent a significant change in the post-Ramanuja period as it won substantial royal patronage, largely due to the influence of Sri Vaishnava acharyas such as Vedanta Desika, Nainaracharya, and Parasara Bhattar during the regimes of Padmanayakas of Telangana, the Rayas of Vijayanagara, and the Reddis of Coastal Andhra in the 14th century.

Some other Sri Vaishnava families that moved from Tamil Nadu to Andhra Pradesh were Bhattars, Kandadais, Tirumalas, and Nallan Chakravatulas. Annamacharya, who was born in Nandavarika Smarta Brahmin family, took initiation into Sri Vaishnavism and composed 32,000 sankeertanas (songs) on the praise of lord Venkateswara and played a significant role in popularizing the Ramanuja Sri Vaishnava Sampradaya which is still popular in the region of Andhra till date.

== Culture ==
Andhra Vaishnavas do not mix with Tamil-speaking Vaishnavas and retain some Telugu customs. They form an exclusive group adopting certain customs based on beliefs in which they have implicit faith, but in most of their general ritualistic observances, they do not differ from the other Brahmin groups. As a matter of fact all brahmins, to whatever section they belong, follow one of the Vedas and in the ceremonies, they adopt the rituals as laid down in the sutras pertaining to their Vedas.

They wear the Srivaishnava Urdhva Pundra and are expected to undergo a ceremony of initiation into Sri Vaishnavism after the Upanayanam ceremony. At the time of initiation, they are branded with the marks of chakram and panchajanya on the right and left shoulders respectively. The ceremony of initiation (Panca-samskara) is usually performed by the head of a mutt. Sometimes it is carried out by an elderly member of the family. Such families go by the name of Swayam Acharya Purushas (those who have their own men as acharyas).
