= Ranganathaswamy Temple, Jiyaguda =

Temple in India dedicated to Lord Ranganatha

Sri Ranganathaswamy Temple Jiyaguda Temple
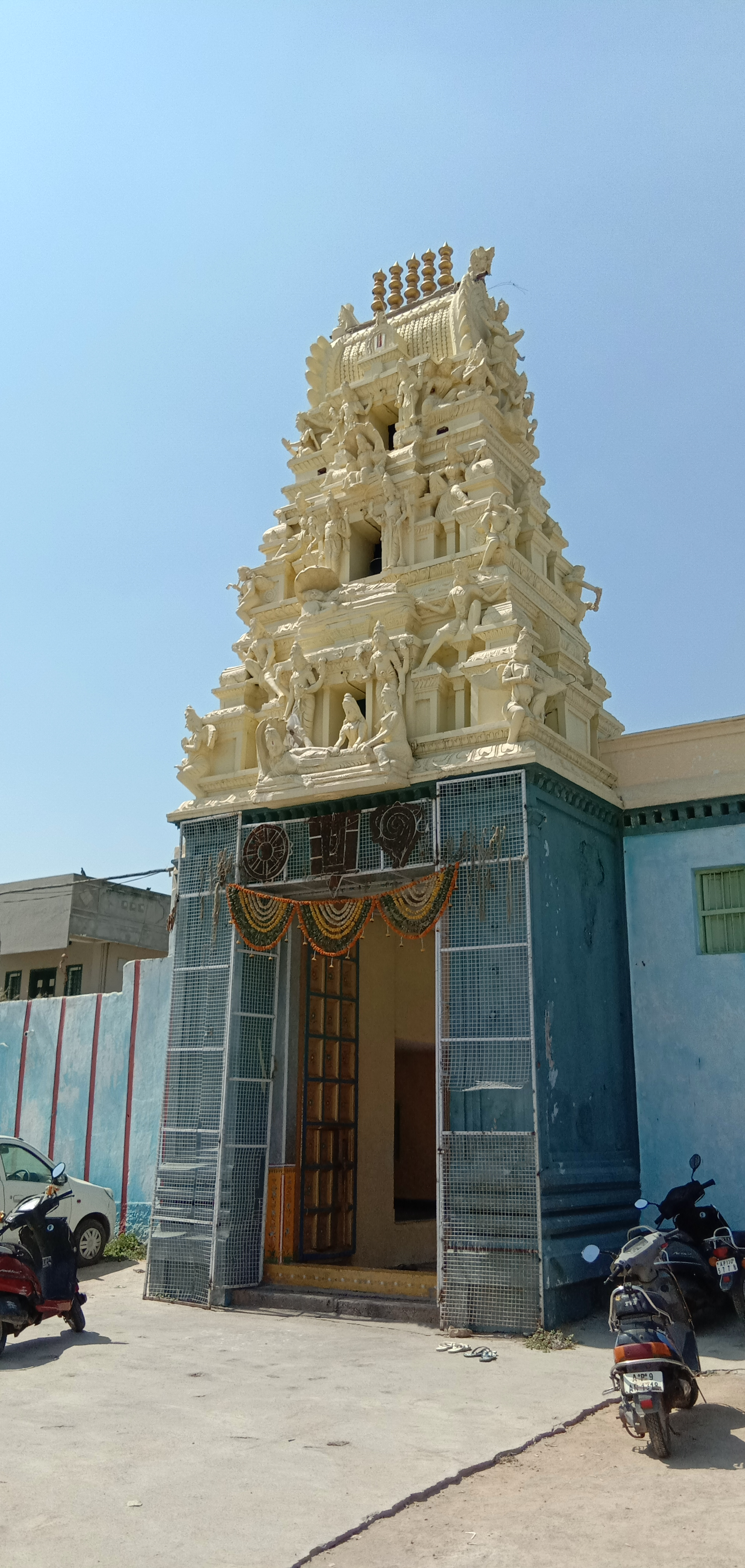
- The temple's rajagopuram

Religion
- Affiliation: Hinduism
- District: Hyderabad
- Deity: Ranganatha (Vishnu), Ranganayaki (Lakshmi)
- Festival: Vaikuntha Ekadasi

Location
- Location: Jiyaguda
- State: Telangana
- Country: India
- Interactive map of Sri Ranganathaswamy Temple; Jiyaguda Temple

Architecture
- Type: Dravidian

Sri Ranganathaswamy temple is a 400 year old Vaishnavite temple dedicated to Lord Ranganatha, a form of the Hindu god Vishnu, which is located at Jiyaguda in Hyderabad, Telangana, India. Situated on the banks of the Musi River, the temple was built by the Nanganur Prathama Peetham and is administered by the Endowments Department of the Telangana state. It initially followed the Thenkalai tradition, but later adopted the more specific Vanamamalai sampradayam. Vaikuntha Ekadashi is the major festival celebrated here, attracting lakhs of devotees every year.

== Etymology ==
During the reign of the Qutb Shahi Dynasty, the area where the temple is currently located was referred to as Shaukar Karvaan (present day Karwan), as the majority of the population who lived back then belonged to the Vaishya and Munnuru Kapu castes. They followed the school of Srivaishnava sampradaya. As Kalyana Vanamamalai Ramanuja Jeeyar, the head of the Vaishnavite Nanganur Prathama Peetham, stayed here for a while and conducted Vishnu worship, the place was later named Jeeyarguda after him. As the local Muslims found it difficult to pronounce Jeeyarguda, the name was altered to Jiyaguda. However, in Sanskrit, the place is still referred to with its previous name.

== History and architecture ==
The temple is estimated to be more than 400 years old, and is the first in Hyderabad which is established by the Nanganur Prathama Peetham. Due to unavailability of priests who knew the Srivaishnava sampradayam within the Nanganur Peetham, priests from the Vanamamalai Peetham of Srirangam came to Hyderabad for conducting the regular worship. With the help of the devotees, the temple was renovated later. In February 2015, the temple has been exempted by the secretary of the Telangana Endowments Department under section 15 and 29 of the Religious and Charitable Endowments act for a period of three years.

The temple is built in an area of two and a half acres following Dravidian style, and is located on the banks of the Musi river. It has a three tier rajagopuram (main temple tower). The central shrine houses a stone image of Ranganatha, a form of Vishnu reclining on a snake bed. There are separate shrines for Lakshmi (worshipped as Ranganayaki) and Andal, apart from Hanuman and Garuda. The dwajasthambam lies behind Garuda's shrine and is made of panchaloha. On the sanctum, images of Vishnu's Dashavatara can be seen.

== Worship and festivals ==
The temple initially followed the Thenkalai tradition in the regular worship, but later switched to the more specific Vanamamalai sampradayam upon the Vaishnavite seer Chinna Jeeyar's recommendation. The temple's affairs are managed by the hereditary temple committee, headed by Srungaram Tiruvengalacharyulu. Seshacharyulu, Rajagopalacharyulu, Badrinath and Srinivasa Ramanuja currently serve as the temple's priests; all of them belong to the Srungaram family who live in the temple's premises.

The temple attracts maximum number of its visitors in the Dhanu month. From 2005, the temple has been celebrating Vaikuntha Ekadashi as its major festival, with lakhs of devotees attending the event from various districts. On Bhogi, the temple authorities perform the Kalyanam (marriage) of Andal with Ranganatha. And, on the third day of Makar Sankranti, they conduct the Vishesha Utsavam. During Chaturmas, Sahasranaman Archana and Revathi Nakshatra Abhishekam are performed apart from the regular worship activities.

== Gallery ==
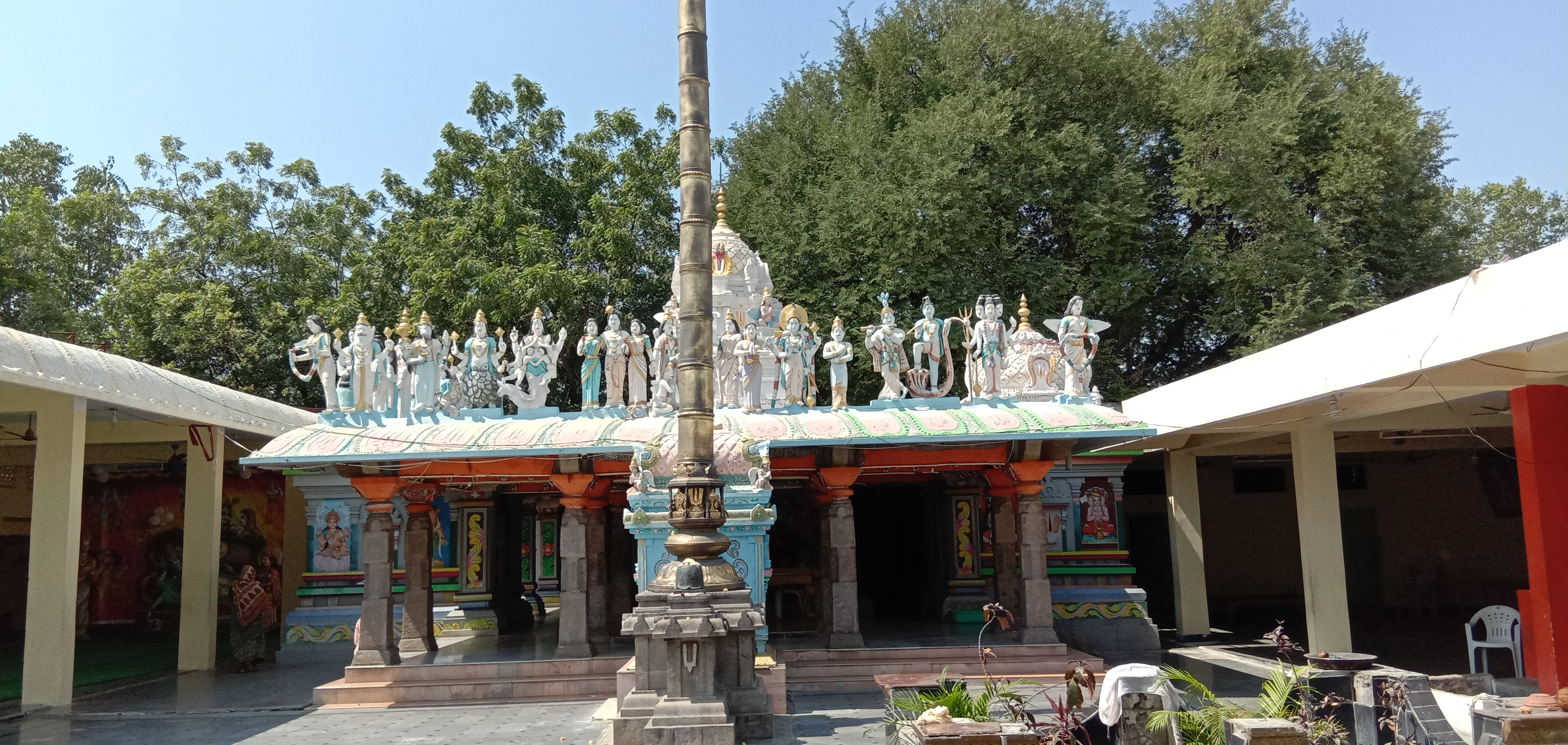
The dhwaja sthamba (flagpost) and garbhagriha (sanctum) of the Sriranganathaswamy temple at Jiyaguda, Hyderabad.

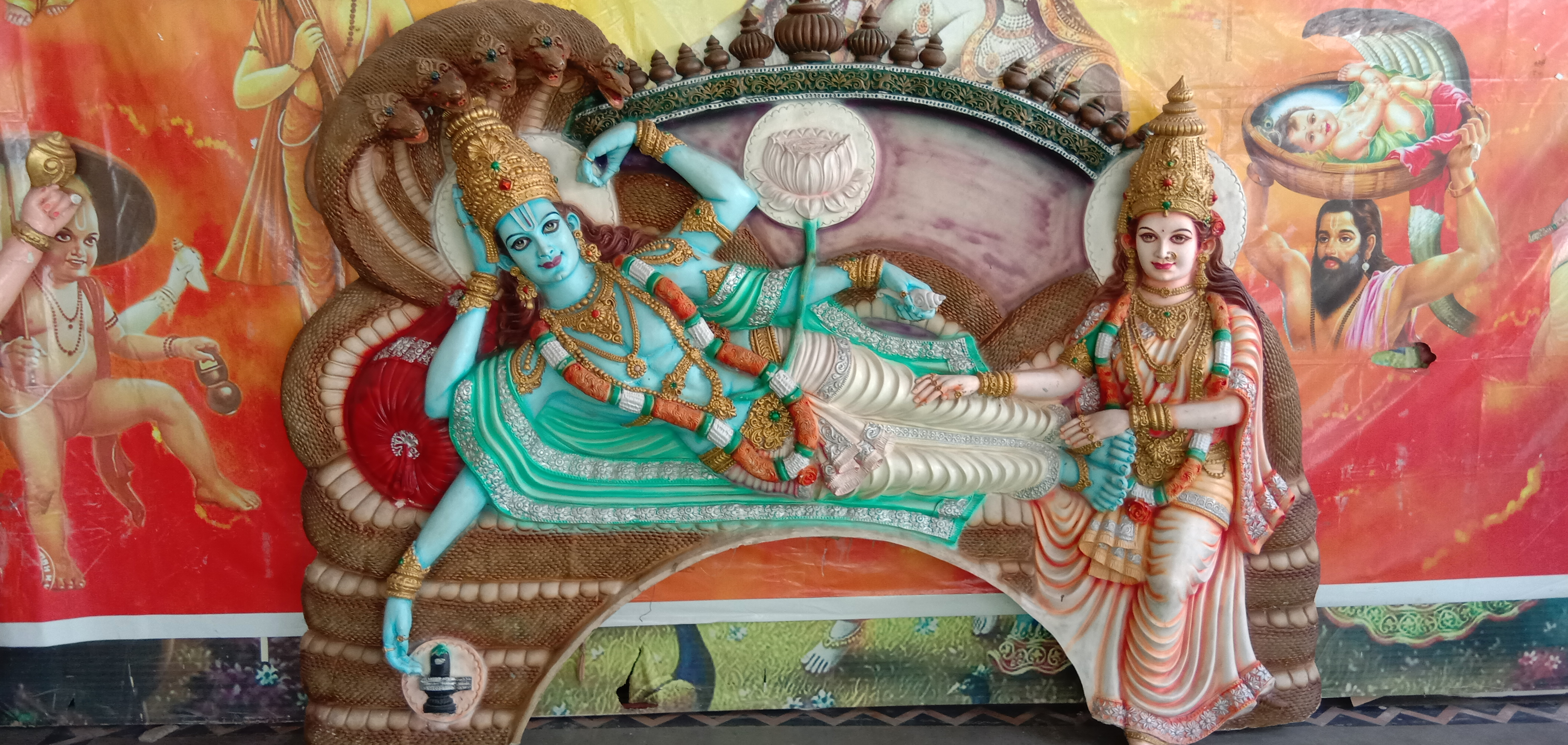
A relic of Lord Ranganatha, a form of Vishnu reclining on the snake bed, along with his consort Lakshmi at the Sriranganathaswamy temple in Jiyaguda, Hyderabad

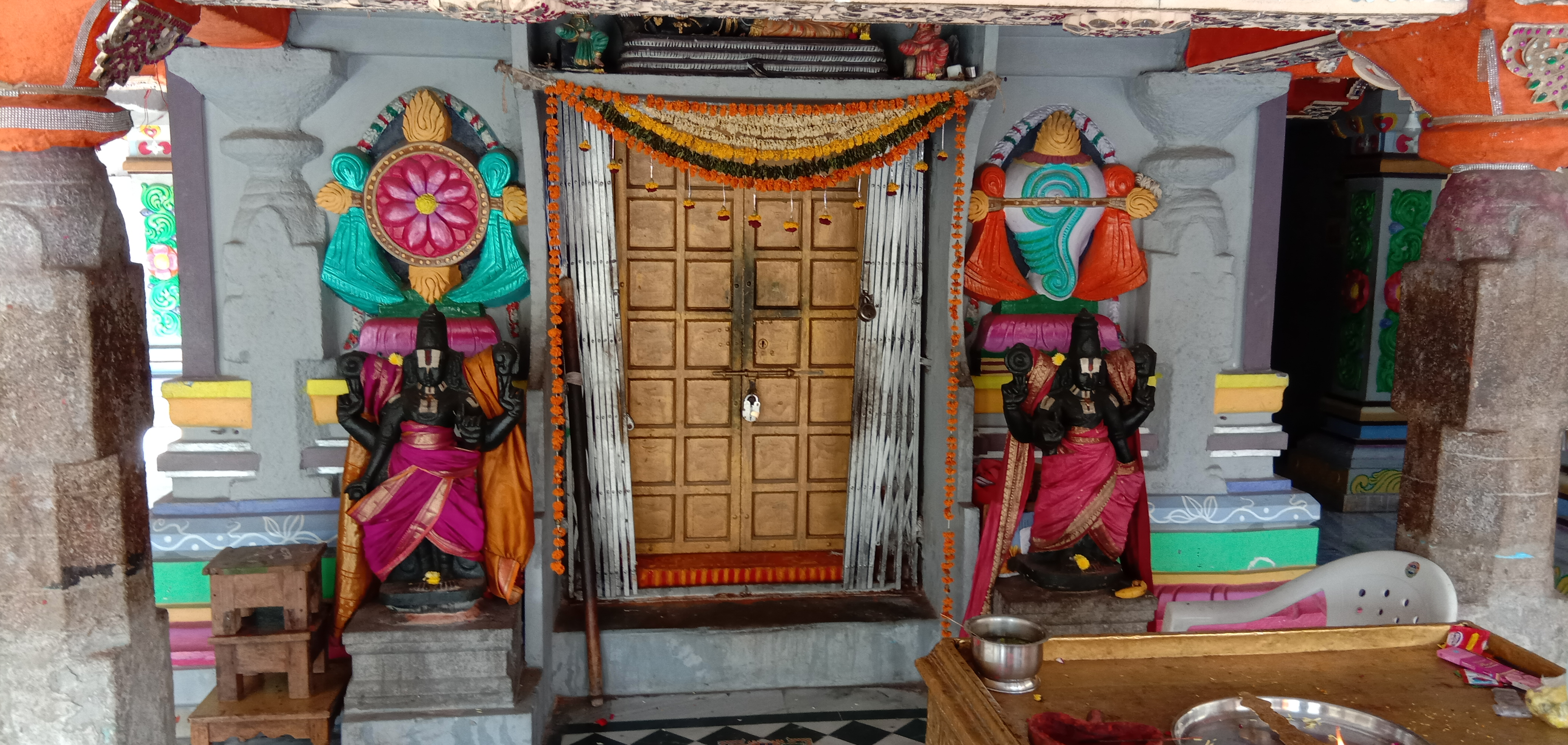
The main door of the sanctum sanctorum of the Sriranganathaswamy temple in Jiyaguda, Hyderabad.
