= Vasudeva Upanishad =

Vaishnava Hindu text

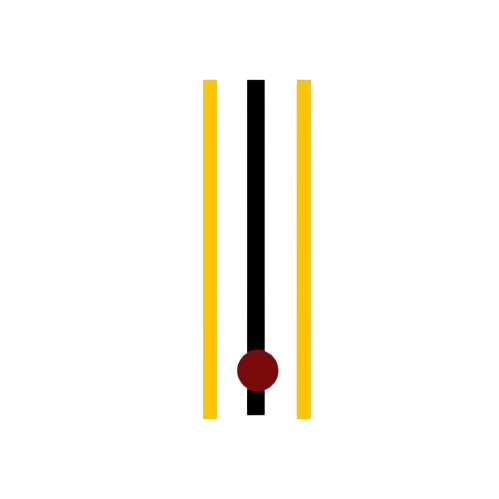
- Urdhva Pundra
- Devanagari: वासुदेव
- IAST: Vāsudeva
- Title means: Vāsudeva or Krishna
- Type: Vaishnava
- Linked Veda: Samaveda

Vasudeva Upanishad (Vāsudeva Upaniṣat) (Sanskrit: वासुदेव उपनिषत्, or Vasudevopanishad is one of 108 Upanishadic Hindu texts, written in Sanskrit language. It belongs to the Vaishnava sect, which worships Vishnu and his avatar Krishna, and this late medieval era minor Upanishad is attached to the Samaveda. It is one of the 14 Vaishnava Upanishads dedicated to Vaishnava sacred marks, including the Urdhva Pundra - the Vaishnava tilaka. It is described in a sermon by Krishna to the sage Narada.

== Date ==
The composition date or author of the text is unknown, and is generally regarded as a "late Upanishad", in terms of dating.

== Contents ==
The sage Narada visited the god Krishna, who is called by his patronymic Vasudeva in the text, and asked Krishna about the rules of Urdhva Pundra, the Vaishnava tilaka. The Upanishad calls the mark Urdhva Tripundra, the upward (Urdhva) three lines.

=== Philosophy ===
Vishnu-Krishna is compared to Brahman, who is non-dual and infinite, without a beginning, middle or end. His form is said to be satchidananda, "being, Consciousness, Bliss". Its indestructibility only comprehended by devotion.

=== Symbolism ===
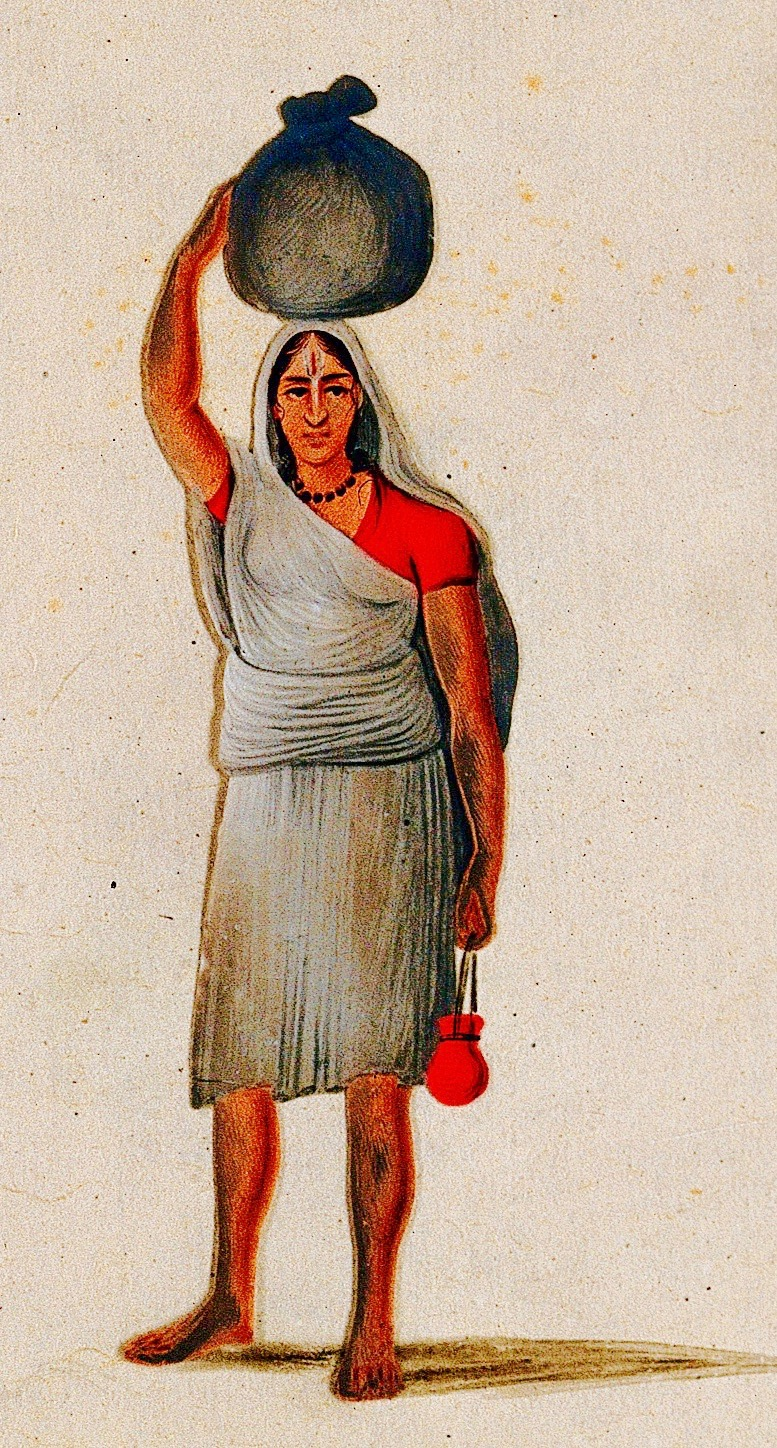
A female sannyasi monk with a Urdhva Pundra mark on forehead (19th century painting).

Krishna extols the Gopichandana (Sanskrit: गोपीचन्दन), also known as Vishnu-chandana, a type of clay and describes the symbol of Urdhva Pundra as well as its application. Chandana is clay mud described to originate from Vaikuntha, Vishnu's abode. The paste was washed off Krishna with milk by the gopis (the milk-maid) devotees and lovers of Krishna, on his body, and therefore states the text, it is called as Gopi-chandana. This yellowish coloured substance is regarded to grant salvation to the devotee.

The Urdhva Pundra symbol, asserts the text, should be created on the forehead with the Gopichandana. If clay is unavailable, a paste made from the roots of the sacred Tulasi plant or sandal may be used. The Smritimuktaphala by Vaidyanatha Dikshita (15th century) quotes the Vasudeva Upanishad about the Gopichandana usage in Urdhva Pundra.

Krishna replies a Brahmachari (student, bachelor) and Grihastha (householder) should apply the tilaka on the forehead after reciting the hymn told in the Vasudeva Upanishad. The hymn dedicated to Vishnu-Krishna, praising Achyuta (the indestructible), Govinda (the protector of cows), one who holds the discus, mace and conch, the Lotus-eyed one who resides in Dwarka, the capital of Krishna. The text suggests that a Vanaprastha may mark the tilaka on 12 other parts of his body after reciting the Vishnu gayatri hymn or the 12 names of Vishnu, namely Keshava, Narayana, Madhava, Govinda, Vishnu, Madhusudana, Trivikrama, Vamana, Sridhara, Hrishikesha, Padmanabha and Damodara. The Sannyasi (renouncer) should anoint the Urdhava Pundra on his forehead with his ring finger chanting Om.

Significance

The three lines of the Urdhva Pundra are related to the Hindu Trinity (Trimurti) of deities - Brahma, Vishnu, Shiva; the first three Vedic scriptures - Rigveda, Yajurveda and Samaveda; three upper worlds Bhu, Bhuva, Svar, the three syllables of Om - Aa, Uu, Ma; three states of existence - awakening, dreaming, asleep and the three bodies - Sthula, Sukshma, and Karana. Thus, one should wear the Urdhva tilaka, as sign of the Lord of Om.

The text declares that a sage should wear four things Urdhva (upward) - "stick, bravery, yoga and Urdhva Pundra". He would attain emancipation.

=== Meditation ===
The later verses of Vasudeva Upanisad describe meditation on Vasudeva, as a form of Yoga. The yogin, asserts the text, should look at his inner most self, Atman as Vasudeva. This goal of meditation, and methodology of worship, is found in Pancaratra Agamas, Puranas and other texts of the Vaishnavism tradition. These texts, states Srinivaschari, assert that Sat (Truth), Atman and Upanishadic concept of Brahman denote the Vedantic metaphysics of Ultimate Reality, and declare all three to be synonymous with Vasudeva. The term Vasudeva itself is synonymous with Vishnu and Vasudeva.

=== Closing ===
The Vasudeva Upanishad ends with a hymn from section 1.22 of the Rigveda:

And the highest step of Vishnu
The patrons see for ever
Like an eye, stationed in heaven.
And wondering over this highest step
Of Vishnu, the priests, wide-awake,
Enkindle the sacrificial fire.

This hymn also appears at the closing of Nrisimha Tapaniya Upanishad, Skanda Upanishad, Muktika Upanishad, as well as in the last chapter of the Aruni Upanishad, an ancient Sannyasa Upanishad.
