= Pingali Lakshmikantam =

Indian poet and writer (1894–1972)

- Born: 10 January 1894; British India
- Died: 1972 (aged 78)
- Occupation: Poet
- Writing career
- Period: 1910–1970

Pingali Lakshmikantam (10 January 1894 in Arthamuru, Krishna district, British India – 1972) was an Indian poet and writer.

== Early life ==
Lakshmikantam was born in Arthamuru, Krishna district, British India. His father was Venkataratnamu, his mother was Kutumbamma. Ancestors of Pingali family were Tikkana and Pingali Suranna.

He studied up to fifth grade in Guduru, 6th and 7th grades in Repalle, and from 8th grade through his BA in Bandar. After finishing the Secondary School Leaving Certificate,

== Career ==
Lakshmikantam worked as a copyist for 2.5 years in the sub-court of Vijayawada. After finishing his BA, he taught at Bandaru Noble School and later at Bandaru Noble College until 1926. After a brief stint at Madras Oriental Manuscript Library as a researcher in 1927. Laksmikantam served as the Head of Telugu department, a division of Andhra University College of Arts and Commerce from 1931 through 1949. He began this new career by preparing syllabus for Telugu and Sanskrit literature courses. He taught history and criticism of Telugu literature to BA (honors) and MA students.

Later, he served as a Literary Adviser to All India Radio and directed several Sanskrit rupakas (dramas). He was appointed in 1954 as a member of working committee of Central Academy of Literature. In 1961, he was appointed as a professor at Sri Venkateswara University, Tirupati. From 1968 till his death, he served as a member of Board of Governors of Telugu Academy and Chairman of Academic Council. He was the Head of the Department of Telugu at Madras Christian College.

In the beginning of the 20th century, drama was very popular in Andhra. Lakshmikantam proficiently played several roles with his brother Narsayya. His roles included Arjuna in "Gayopakhayanam," Krishna in "Narakasuravadha," Rakshasa in "Mudrarakshasam", and Dharmaraju in "Pandavodyogavijayalu." He also participated in another popular literary tradition called Avadhanam.

It was a fashion to write poetry as a pair. Pingali Lakshmikantam paired up with Katuri Venkateswarrao and became known as Pingali- Katuri Poets. Their joint ventures were tolakari and soundaranandnam.

== Bibliography ==
1. Andhra Sahitya Charitra
2. Saahitya Silpa Sameeksha
3. Madhurapanditarajamu
4. Gangalahari
5. Tejolahari
6. Atmalahari
7. Andhravajnmaya charitra
8. Goutama Vyasalu
9. Na Radio Prasangalu (compilation of his All India Radio speeches)
10. All Men are Brothers
11. Tolakari
12. Soundaranandam
