= Sri Andal Jeeyar Mutt Srivilliputtur =

Sri Pillailokachariyar with Sri Manavala Mamunigal, Sri Manavala Mamunigal Jeeyar Mutt, Srivilliputtur

Sri Manavala Mamunigal Jeeyar Mutt is a religious centre in the temple town of Srivilliputtur. The Mutt follows the Thenkalai tradition of Sri Vaishnava culture. The Mutt has Manavala Mamunigal as the torch bearer of the tradition of Vishistadvaita and Emberumanar Darsanam, which is known to be the way as propagated by sants Ramanuja. The Mutt houses seers who have the title of Sri Satagopa Ramanuja Jeeyar. The present pontiff of the Mutt is the 23rd Peetam Paramahamsethyathi Sri Sri Sri Satagopa Ramanuja Jeeyar Swami. The Mutt has an unbroken lineage from its founder Manavala Mamunigal.

== History ==
Sri Manavala Mamunigal visited Srivilliputtur, the birthplace of Andal and Sri Periyalwar the greatest Vaishnavaitic Sants during the Pandya Kingdom period. Legends say that Sri Mamunigal (seer of Sri Rangam) attended the darshan of Thayar Sri Andal during her most celebrated Maargali Ennaikaapu Festival. This festival is celebrated annually in December–January.

Sri Andal appeared in the dreams of the Archakas (temple priests) and Athyapakas (people of the town) and extended the festival for one more day so that Sri Manavala Mamunigal would have a chance to attend.

As per the orders of the presiding deity of the temple Sri Andal, arrangements were made for Sri Manavala Mamunigal to witness the festival for one more day. Sri Andal appeared before Sri Mamunigal and asked him whether he had any other grievances. After observing Sri Andal from her crown to lotus feet he said that she looked very graceful and offered her a kunjam (ornament used to decorate women's hair plaits). Legends say that the kunjam was offered by Tamil poet Kamban when he visited Srivilliputtur. Hence, the kunjam is known as ‘Kamban Kunjam’.

On Maharasankarathi day (first day of Tamil month ‘Thai’, usually 14 or 15 January) Sri Andal blesses for the sake of Sri Manavala Mamunigal and after taking a bath in the temple pond ‘Thirumukkulam – Sri Sudharsana Chakkra Theertham’. She arrived at the entrance of this Mutt and Manavala Mamunigal processional deity brought near her to observe her maternal divine beauty.

== Tradition ==
This Mutt is an independent mutt and is the only mutt established by Sri Manavala Mamunigal on the request of Srivilliputtur people to give them discourses on philosophical values and Sri Vaishnava tradition. To continue this divine duty, Sri Manavala Mamunigal established the aacharya peetam and appointed seers to succeed him. This mutt holds a continuous history with the Seers known as Jeeyars for 600 years. Despite interruptions due to invasions, the mutt holds records of grants given by various rulers such as the King of Mysore. The 23rd peetam is Sri Sri Sri Satakopa Ramanuja. Jeeyar Swamy was the pontiff of this mutt as of 2014.

== Sri Thiruvalmarbhan ==
The divinity deemed to be in the mutt is Sri Thiruvalmarbhan ("The Lord Who has His chest as a divine residence of His Consort Sri Lakshmi Devi known as Thayar"). Sri Thiruvalmarbhan in this mutt holds a special history. The Lord was among the 'Pancha Berars' (the important five forms of Lord residing in every temple that follows an aagama way of worship) of the Divya Desam of Thiruvalla. A magician stole the idol and was travelling towards his home via the foothills of Western Ghats. The magician hid the idol in a cave. The Lord appeared in Manavala Mamunigal's dreams and ordered him to fetch the idol from the cave. The idol is seated at the immediate left of Manavala Mamunigal's processional deity.
