= Sri Vaishnavism =

One of the major Vaishnava traditions

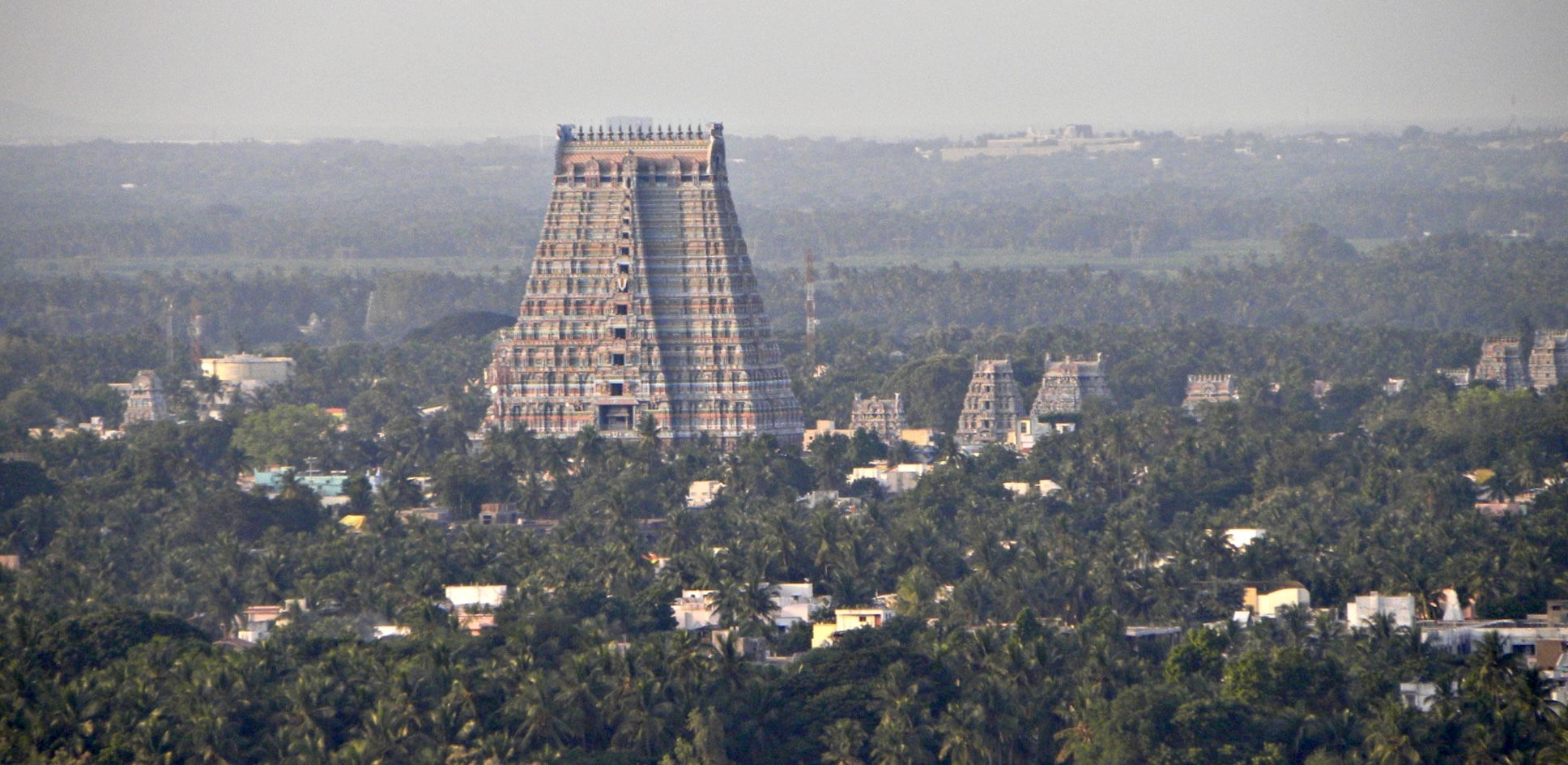
- The Ranganathaswamy Temple of Srirangam is the largest Hindu temple in India.

Regions with significant populations
- India, Nepal

Religions
- Vaishnavism (Hinduism)

Scriptures
- Vedas, Upanishads, Bhagavad Gita, Brahma Sutra, Pancharatra, Prabandham

Languages
- Tamil, Sanskrit

Sri Vaishnavism (Sanskrit: श्रीवैष्णवसम्प्रदाय, romanized: Śrīvaiṣṇavasampradāya) is a denomination within the Vaishnavism tradition of Hinduism, predominantly practiced in South India. The name refers to goddess Lakshmi (also known as Sri), as well as a prefix that means "sacred, revered", and the god Vishnu, who are together revered in this tradition.

The tradition traces its roots to the ancient Vedas and Pancharatra texts, popularised by the Alvars and their canon, the Naalayira Divya Prabandham. The founding of Sri Vaishnavism is traditionally attributed to Nathamuni of the 10th century CE; its central philosopher has been Ramanuja of the 11th century, who developed the Vishishtadvaita ("qualified non-dualism") Vedanta sub-school of Hindu philosophy. The tradition split into two denominations around the 16th century. The Vadakalai or uttarakalārya sect emphasize the Vedas and follow the doctrine of Vedanta Desika, whereas the Tenkalai or dakṣiṇakalārya sect emphasize the Naalayira Divya Prabandham follow the principles of Manavala Mamunigal. The Telugu Brahmins of the Sri Vaishnava tradition form a single distinct sect called the Andhra Vaishnavas, and are not divided into the Vadakalai and Tenkalai denominations, unlike the Tamil Iyengars.

== Etymology ==
The name Sri Vaishnavism (IAST: Śrīvaiṣṇavism) is derived from two words, Sri and Vaishnavism. In Sanskrit, the word Sri refers to goddess Lakshmi as well as a prefix that means "sacred, revered", and god Vishnu who are together revered in this tradition. The word Vaishnavism refers to a tradition that reveres god Vishnu as the supreme god. The followers of Sri Vaishnavism are known as the Sri Vaishnavas (IAST: Śrīvaiṣṇava, श्रीवैष्णव).

== History ==
=== Theological origins ===
The tradition traces its roots to the primordial start of the world through Vishnu, and to the texts of the Vedic era with both Sri and Vishnu found in ancient texts of the 1st millennium BCE particularly in the Puranas, Upanishads, and the Bhagavad Gita.

=== Historical origins ===
The historical basis of Sri Vaishnavism is in the syncretism of two developments. The first is Sanskrit traditions found in ancient texts such as the Vedas and the Agama (Pancaratra, Vaikhanasa), and the second is the Tamil traditions found in early medieval texts (Tamil Prabandham) and practices such as the emotional songs and music of Alvars that expressed spiritual ideas, ethics and devotion to Vishnu. The Sanskrit traditions likely represent the ideas shared in ancient times, from the Ganges river plains of the northern Indian subcontinent, while the Tamil traditions likely have roots in the Kaveri river plains of southern India, particularly what in modern times are the coastal Andhra Pradesh, Karnataka and Tamil Nadu region.

The tradition was founded by Nathamuni (10th century), who combined the two traditions, by drawing on Sanskrit philosophical tradition and combining it with the aesthetic and emotional appeal of the bhakti movement pioneers called the Alvars. Sri Vaishnavism developed in Tamil Nadu after Nathamuni returned from a pilgrimage to Vrindavan in north India (modern Uttar Pradesh).

Nathamuni's ideas were continued by Yamunacharya, who maintained that the Vedas and Pancaratras are equal, devotional rituals and bhakti are important practices. The legacy of Yamunacharya was continued by Ramanuja, but they never met. Legend goes that Ramanuja saw Yamunacharya's corpse, which had three fingers curled. Ramanuja was told that they represented the three wishes that Yamunacharya had revealed before he died. One of the wishes was that Ramanuja should write a commentary on the Brahma Sutras. Ramanuja, a scholar who studied in an Advaita Vedanta monastery and disagreed with some of the ideas of Advaita, became the most influential leader of Sri Vaishnavism. He developed the Visistadvaita ("qualified non-dualism") philosophy.

Around 14th century, Ramanandi Sampradaya split from Sri Vaishnavism. Around the 18th century, the Sri Vaishnava tradition split into the Vadakalai ("northern culture", Vedic) and Tenkalai ("southern culture", bhakti). The Vadakalai placed more emphasis on the Sanskrit traditions, while the Tenkalai relied more on the Tamil traditions. This theological dispute between the Vedic and bhakti traditions traces it roots to the debate between Srirangam and Kanchipuram monasteries between the 13th and 15th centuries. The debate then was on the nature of salvation and the role of grace. According to Patricia Mumme, the bhakti-favouring Tenkalai tradition asserted that Vishnu saves the soul like "a mother cat carries her kitten", where the kitten just accepts the mother while she picks her up and carries. In contrast the karma-favouring Vadakalai tradition asserted that Vishnu saves the soul like "a mother monkey carries her baby", where the baby has to make an effort and hold on while the mother carries it. This metaphorical description of the disagreement between the two sub-traditions first appears in 18th-century Tamil texts, but historically refers to the foundational ideas behind the karma-marga versus bhakti-marga traditions of Hinduism.

=== Reverence for Vishnu and Lakshmi ===
Along with Vishnu, and like Shaivism, the ultimate reality and truth is considered in Sri Vaishnavism to be the divine sharing of the feminine and the masculine, the goddess and the god. Sri (Lakshmi) is regarded as the preceptor of the Sri Vaishnava sampradaya. Goddess Sri has been considered inseparable from god Vishnu, and essential to each other, and to the act of mutual loving devotion. Sri and Vishnu act and cooperate in the creation of everything that exists, and redemption. According to some medieval scholars of Sri Vaishnava theology, states John Carman, Sri and Vishnu do so using "divine knowledge that is unsurpassed" and through "love that is an erotic union". But Sri Vaishnavism differs from Shaivism, in that Vishnu is ultimately the sole creator, preserver and destroyer of the universe while Sri Lakshmi is the medium for salvation, the kind mother who recommends to Vishnu and thereby helps living beings in their desire for redemption and salvation. In contrast, in Shaivism, the goddess (Shakti) is the energy and power of Shiva and she is the equal with different roles, supreme in the role of creator and destroyer.

The prefix Sri is used for this sect because they give special importance to the worship of the Goddess Lakshmi, the consort of Vishnu, who they believe to act as a mediator between God Vishnu and man.

== Philosophy ==
=== Vishishtadvaita ===
Sri Vaishnavism's philosophical foundation was systematized by Ramanuja. Ramanuja developed the doctrine of qualified monism, called Vishishtadvaita in Hindu philosophy, which became the central philosophical system of Sri Vaishnavism.

Vishishtadvaita asserts that Atman (souls) and Brahman (Note: Brahman is the metaphysical ultimate unchanging reality in Vedic and post-Vedic Hinduism, and is Vishnu in Sri Vaishnavism.) are different, a difference that is never transcended. God Vishnu alone is independent, all other gods and beings depend on him. However, in contrast to Dvaita Vedanta philosophy of Madhvacharya, Ramanuja asserts "qualified non-dualism", arguing that souls share the same essential nature of Brahman, and that the quality and degree of bliss possible for human souls are universally the same, and every soul can reach the bliss state of God himself. While the 13th- to 14th-century Madhvacharya asserted both "qualitative and quantitative pluralism of souls", Ramanuja asserted "qualitative monism and quantitative pluralism of souls", states Sharma. Another philosophical difference between Madhvacharya's Vaishnavism sampradaya and Ramanuja's Vaishnavism sampradaya, (Note: These two Vaishnavism traditions are respectively called the Sri Vaishnava sampradaya and the Brahma sampradaya.) has been on the idea of eternal damnation; Madhvacharya believed that some souls are eternally doomed and damned, while Ramanuja disagreed and accepted the Advaita Vedanta view that everyone can, with effort, achieve inner liberation and spiritual freedom (moksha).

Theology

Śrīvaiṣṇava theologians state that the poems of
the Alvars contain the essential meaning of
the Sanskrit Vedas.

— John Carman and Vasudha Narayanan

According to Sri Vaishnavism theology, moksha can be reached by devotion and service to the Lord and detachment from the world. When moksha is reached, the cycle of reincarnation is broken and the soul is united with Vishnu, though maintaining their distinctions, in Vaikuntha, Vishnu's heaven. Moksha can also be reached by total surrender (saranagati), an act of grace by the Lord.

God, according to Ramanuja's Sri Vaishnavism philosophy, has both soul and body; all of life and the world of matter is the glory of God's body. The path to Brahman (Vishnu), asserted Ramanuja, is devotion to godliness and constant remembrance of the beauty and love of personal god (saguna Brahman, Vishnu). Ramanuja's theory posits that both Brahman and the world of matter are two different absolutes, both metaphysically real, neither one false or illusory, and saguna Brahman with attributes is also real.

=== Comparisons with Advaita Vedanta ===
Ramanuja accepted that the Vedas are a reliable source of knowledge, then critiqued other schools of Hindu philosophy, including Advaita Vedanta, as having failed in interpreting all of the Vedic texts. He asserted, in his Sri Bhashya, that purvapaksin (previous schools) selectively interpret those Upanishadic passages that support their monistic interpretation, and ignore those passages that support the pluralism interpretation. There is no reason, stated Ramanuja, to prefer one part of a scripture and not other, the whole of the scripture must be considered on par. One cannot, according to Ramanuja, attempt to give interpretations of isolated portions of any scripture. Rather, the scripture must be considered one integrated corpus, expressing a consistent doctrine. The Vedic literature, asserted Ramanuja, mentions both plurality and oneness, therefore the truth must incorporate pluralism and monism, or qualified monism.

=== Comparisons with Protestant Christianity and Buddhism ===
John Carman, a professor at the Harvard Divinity School, states that some of the similarities in salvation ideas in Sri Vaishnavism and Protestant Christian doctrines of divine grace are striking. Both accept God as a personal concept, accept devotee's ability to relate to this God without human intermediaries, and accept the idea of sola gratia – salvation through faith by the grace of God alone, such as those found in Martin Luther's teachings. While both Sri Vaishnavism and Protestant Christianity accept a supreme God and shares ideas on the nature of salvation, they differ in their specifics about incarnation such as Jesus Christ being the only incarnation in Christianity, while Sri Vaishnavism accepts many incarnations (avatar) of Vishnu. Christian missionaries in 19th century colonial British India, noted the many similarities and attempted to express the theology of Christianity as a bhakti marga to Hindus, along the lines of Sri Vaishnavism, in their mission to convert them from Hinduism to Christianity.

Similar teachings on the nature of salvation through grace and compassion, adds Carman, are found in the Japanese scholar Shinran's text on Jodo Shinshu sect of Buddhism, even though non-theistic Buddhism and theistic Sri Vaishnavism do differ in their views on God. Similarly, Pure Land Buddhists also maintain a desire to be reborn in the highest heaven where one may learn the purest form of moksha from buddhas and bodhisattvas such as Avalokiteśvara; this reflects the desire of all Vaishnava to be born in Vaikuntha where the highest form of meditation on Narayana occurs.

== Texts and scholarship ==
Sri Vaishnavism philosophy is primarily based on interpreting Vedanta, particularly the Upanishads, the Bhagavad Gita, the Brahma Sutras and the Narayaniya section of the Mahabharata. The Vaishnava Agama texts, also called the Pancaratra, has been an important part of Sri Vaishnava tradition. Another theological textual foundation of the tradition are the Tamil bhakti songs of the Alvars (7th to 10th century). The syncretic fusion of the two textual traditions is sometimes referred to as the Ubhaya Vedanta, or dual Vedanta. The relative emphasis between the two has been a historic debate within the Sri Vaishnavism tradition, which ultimately led to the schism into the Vatakalai and Tenkalai sub-traditions around the 18th century.

=== Nathamuni ===
Nathamuni collected the poems of Nammalvar, in the form of Divya Prabandham, likely in the 9th century CE, or the 10th century. One of his lasting contributions was to apply the Vedic theory of music on all the Alvar songs using Sanskrit prosody, calling the resulting choreography as divine music, and teaching his nephews the art of resonant bhakti singing of the Alvar songs. This precedence set the guru-śiṣya-parampara (teacher-student-tradition) in Sri Vaishnavism. This style of education from one generation to the next, is a tradition called Araiyars, states Guy Beck, which preserved "the art of singing and dancing the verses of the Divya Prabandham" set in the sacred melodies and rhythms described in the Vedic texts.

Nathamuni's efforts to syncretically combine the Vedic knowledge and Alvar compositions, also set the precedence of reverence for both the Vedas and the Alvar bhakti ideas. Nathamuni's scholarship that set Alvar songs in Vedic meter set a historic momentum, and the liturgical and meditational songs continue to be sung in the modern era temples of Sri Vaishnavism, which is part of the service called sevai (Sanskrit: Seva).

=== Yamunacharya ===
Yamunacharya was the grandson of Nathamuni, also known in Sri Vaishnava tradition as Alavandar, whose scholarship is remembered for correlating Alvar bhakti theology and Pancaratra Agama texts to Vedic ideas. He was the acharya (chief teacher) of Sri Vaishnavism monastery at Srirangam, and was followed by Ramanuja, even though they never met. Yamunacharya composed a number of works important in Sri Vaishnavism, particularly Siddhitrayam (about the nature of Atman, God, universe), Gitarthasangraha (analysis of the Bhagavad Gita), Agamapramanya (epistemological basis of Agamas, mapping them to the Vedas), Maha Purushanirnayam (extension of Nathamuni's treatise), Stotraratnam and Chathuh shloki (bhakti strota texts).

Yamunacharya is also credited with Nitya Grantha and Mayavada Khandana. The Nitya Grantha is a ritual text and suggests methods of daily worship of Narayana (Vishnu). The Mayavada Khandana text, together with Siddhitrayam critiques the philosophy of Advaita Vedanta and other non-Vedic traditions.

=== Ramanuja ===
The Sri Vaishnava tradition attributes nine Sanskrit texts to Ramanuja – Vedarthasamgraha (literally, "Summary of the Vedas meaning" (Note: This work is predominantly about the Hindu scriptures called the Upanishads which Ramanuja held as the essence of the Vedas.)) Sri Bhasya (a review and commentary on the Brahma Sutras), Bhagavad Gita Bhashya (a review and commentary on the Bhagavad Gita), and the minor works titled Vedantadipa, Vedantasara, Gadya Traya (which is a compilation of three texts called the Sharanagati Gadyam, Sriranga Gadyam and the Vaikuntha Gadyam), and Nitya Grantham.

Some modern scholars have questioned the authenticity of all but three major works; Sri Bhasya, Vedarthasamgraha, and Bhagavad Gita Bhasya.

Ramanuja's scholarship is predominantly founded on Vedanta, Upanishads in particular. He never claims that his ideas were original, but his method of synthesis that combined the Vedic ideas with popular spirituality, states Anne Overzee, is original. According to his biographer Ramakrishnananda, Ramanuja was "the culmination of the movement started from the Vedas, nourished by the Alvars, Nathamuni and Yamuncharya".

Ramunaja himself credits the theories he presents, in Vedarthasamgraha, to the ideas of ancient Hindu scholars such as "Bodhyana, Tanka (Brahmanandin), Dramida (Dravidacarya), Guhadeva, Kapardin and Bharuci". (Note: The texts of most of these scholars is lost to history.) The 11th-century scholarship of Ramanuja emphasized the concept of Sarira-Saririn, that is the world of matter and the empirical reality of living beings is the "body of Brahman", (Note: Brahman is the Vedic concept of metaphysical unchanging reality.) everything observed is God, one lives in this body of God, and the purpose of this body and all of creation is to empower soul in its journey to liberating salvation.

=== Post Ramanuja period authors ===
After Ramanuja several authors composed important theological and exegetical works on Sri Vaishnavism. Such authors include Parsara Bhattar, Nadadoor Ammal, Sudarshan Suri, Pillai Lokacharya, Vedanta Desika, Manavala Mamunigal, Periyavachan Pillai and Rangaramanuja Muni.

== Organisation ==
The Sri Vaishnavism tradition has nurtured an institutional organization of mathas (monasteries) since its earliest days, particularly from the time of Ramanuja. After the death of Yamunacharya, Ramanuja was nominated as the leader of the Srirangam matha, though Yamunacharya and Ramanuja never met. Amongst other things, Ramanuja is remembered in the Sri Vaishnavism tradition for his organizational skills and the lasting institutional reforms he introduced at Srirangam, a system paralleling those at Advaita monasteries of his time and where he studied before joining Srirangam matha. Ramanuja travelled and founded many Sri Vaishnavism mathas across India, such as the one in Melukote. The Sri Vaishnavism tradition believes that Ramanuja started 700 mathas, but historical evidence suggests several of these were started later.

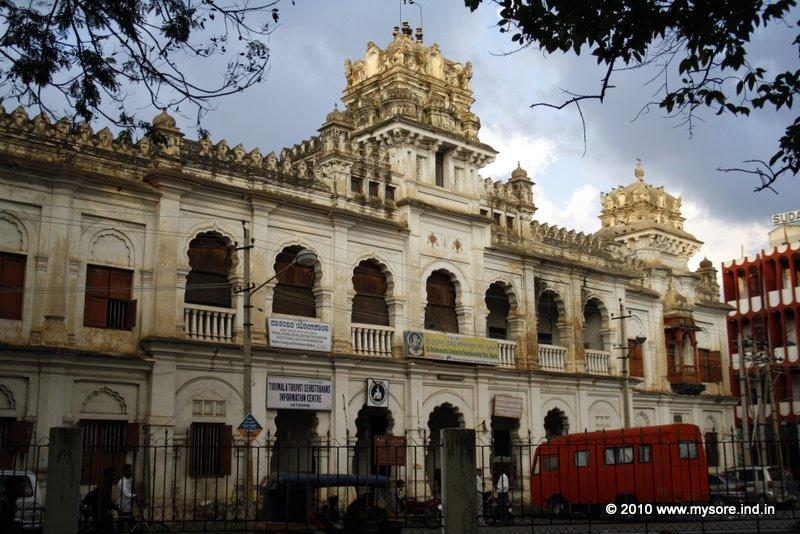
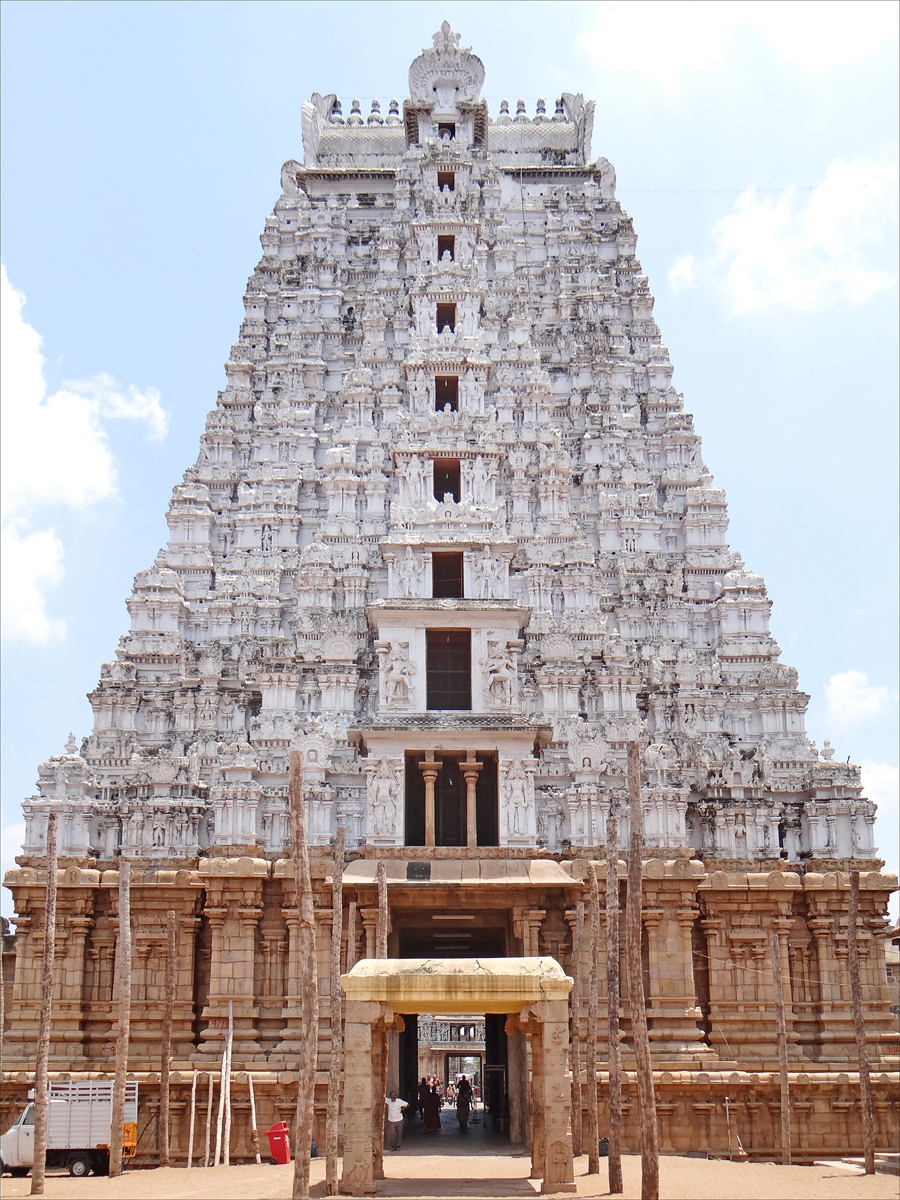
Left: The Parakala monastery of Sri Vaishnavism
Right: A Srirangam temple tower constructed by Ahobila Mutt monastery.

The matha, or a monastery, hosted numerous students and teachers, and maintained an institutionalized structure to sustain daily operations. A matha in Vaishnvaism and other Hindu traditions, like a college, designates teaching, administrative and community interaction functions, with prefix or suffix to names, with titles such as Guru, Acharya, Swami, and Jiyar.

A Guru is someone who is a "teacher, guide or master" of certain knowledge. Traditionally a reverential figure to the student in Hinduism, the guru serves as a "counselor, who helps mold values, shares experiential knowledge as much as literal knowledge, an exemplar in life, an inspirational source and who helps in the spiritual evolution of a student."

An Acharya refers to either a Guru of high rank, or more often to the leader of a regional monastery. This position typically involves a ceremonial initiation called diksha by the monastery, where the earlier leader anoints the successor as Acharya. A Swami is usually those who interact with community on the behalf of the matha. The chief and most revered of all Vaishnava monasteries, are titled as Jeer, Jiyar, Jeeyar, or Ciyar.

Over time, Sri Vaishnavism mathas divided into two traditions: the Tenkalai (southern) tradition and Vadakalai (northern) tradition of Sri Vaishnavism. The Tenkalai-associated mathas are headquartered at Srirangam, while Vadakalai mathas are associated with Kanchipuram. From 10th-century onwards, these mathas served various philanthropic functions, including feeding the poor and devotees who visit, hosting marriages and community festivals, farming temple lands and flower gardens as a source for food and worship ingredients, maintaining rest houses for pilgrims. In the 15th-century, these monasteries expanded by establishing Ramanuja-kuta in major South Indian Sri Vaishnavism locations. The organizationally important Sri Vaishnavism matha are:

- Tenkalai tradition
  - Sriranganarayana Jiyar Matha at Srirangam, Tamil Nadu
  - Vanamamalai Jiyar Matha at Nanguneri, Tamil Nadu
  - Perarulala Yatiraja Ramanuja Jiyar Matha at Thirukkurungudi, Tamil Nadu
  - Yatiraja Matha at Sriperumbudur, Tamil Nadu
  - Udaiyavar Koil Jiyar Matha at Alvar Tirunagari, Tamil Nadu
  - Emperumanar Jiyar Matha at Tirukkovalur, Tamil Nadu
  - Andal Jeeyar Mutt at Srivilliputtur, Tamil Nadu
  - Yadugiri Yathiraja Mutt at Melkote, Karnataka
  - Periya and Cinna Jiyar Matha at Tirupati and Tirumala, Andhra Pradesh
- Vadakalai tradition
  - Brahmatantra Parakala Matha at Mysore, Karnataka
  - Ahobila Jiyar Matha at Ahobila, Andhra Pradesh
  - Andavan Ashramam at Srirangam, Tamil Nadu

== Vadakalai and Tenkalai denominations ==
The Sri Vaishnava tradition is classified into two major denominations called the Vadakalai ("northern art") and Tenkalai ("southern art"). The northern and southern denominations of Sri Vaishnavism refer respectively to Kanchipuram (the northern part of Tamil country) and Srirangam (the southern part of Tamil country and Kaveri river delta area where Ramanuja wrote his Vedanta treatises from). These denominations arose as a result of philosophical and theological divergences in the post-Ramanuja period.

The Vadakalai placed emphasis on the Vedas in its system of worship, while the Tenkalai highlighted the Naalayira Divya Prabandham of the Alvars. Both generally follow the principles of the Pancharatra Agamas for their domestic rituals (like pancha-samskara initiation) and temple worship, but the specific Agama (Pancharatra or Vaikhanasa) followed can vary by temple.

The philosophies of Pillai Lokacharya and Vedanta Desika, which evolved consequently, were stabilized by Manavala Mamunigal and Brahmatantra Svatantra Jiyar respectively. When the schism weakened, Vadakalai tradition split into Munitreyam, Ahobila Matha, and Parakala matha. Similarly, Tenkalai tradition split into Kandadais, Telugu Sri Vaishnavas, Soliyar, and Sikkiliyar.

From the ancient period, the Sri Vaishnavism movement flourished in Tamilakam owing to its social inclusiveness, where devotion to the supreme deity (Vishnu) was open without limitation to gender or caste, a tradition led by Alvars in the 7th and the 8th centuries. Ramanuja philosophy negated caste, states Ramaswamy. Ramanuja, who led from the Srirangam temple, welcomed outcastes into temples and gave them important roles in temple duties. Medieval temple records and inscriptions suggest that the payments and offerings collected by the temple were shared regardless of caste distinctions.

Scholars offer differing views on the relative approach of the two denominations on caste and gender. Raman states that Tenkalai did not recognise caste barriers and were more liberal in assimilating people from all castes, possibly because this had been the tradition at Srirangam from the earliest days of Sri Vaishnavism. In contrast, Sadarangani states that it was Vadakalai who were more liberal and who did not recognise caste barriers, possibly because they were competing with the egalitarian Virashaiva Hindus (Lingayatism) of Karnataka. Both sects believe in initiation through Pancha Samskara. This ceremony or rite of passage is necessary for one to become a Vaishnava. It is performed by both Brahmins and non-Brahmins in order to become Vaishnavas. Some non-Brahmin Vaishnavas include Telugu Naidu, Tamil Vanniyar and Namadhari. Only those Vaishnavas who are of brahmin caste call themselves as Sri Vaishnavas.

Both Vadakalai and Tenkalai Brahmins perform the same Vedic saṃskāras (upanayanam, yajñopavīta, śrāddha, etc.). Neither has ever abandoned the Sanskrit Vedas or the Divya Prabandham. The difference lies in how much Sanskrit recitation and commentary is foregrounded in daily life and temple ritual, not in adherence to Vedic authority itself.

In worship, the Vadakalai school foregrounds Sanskrit study and Dharmaśāstra observance, while the Tenkalai school foregrounds the Tamil Divya Prabandham, as an equally sacred expression of Vedic revelation. Both traditions are fully rooted in Vedic and Smṛti foundations.

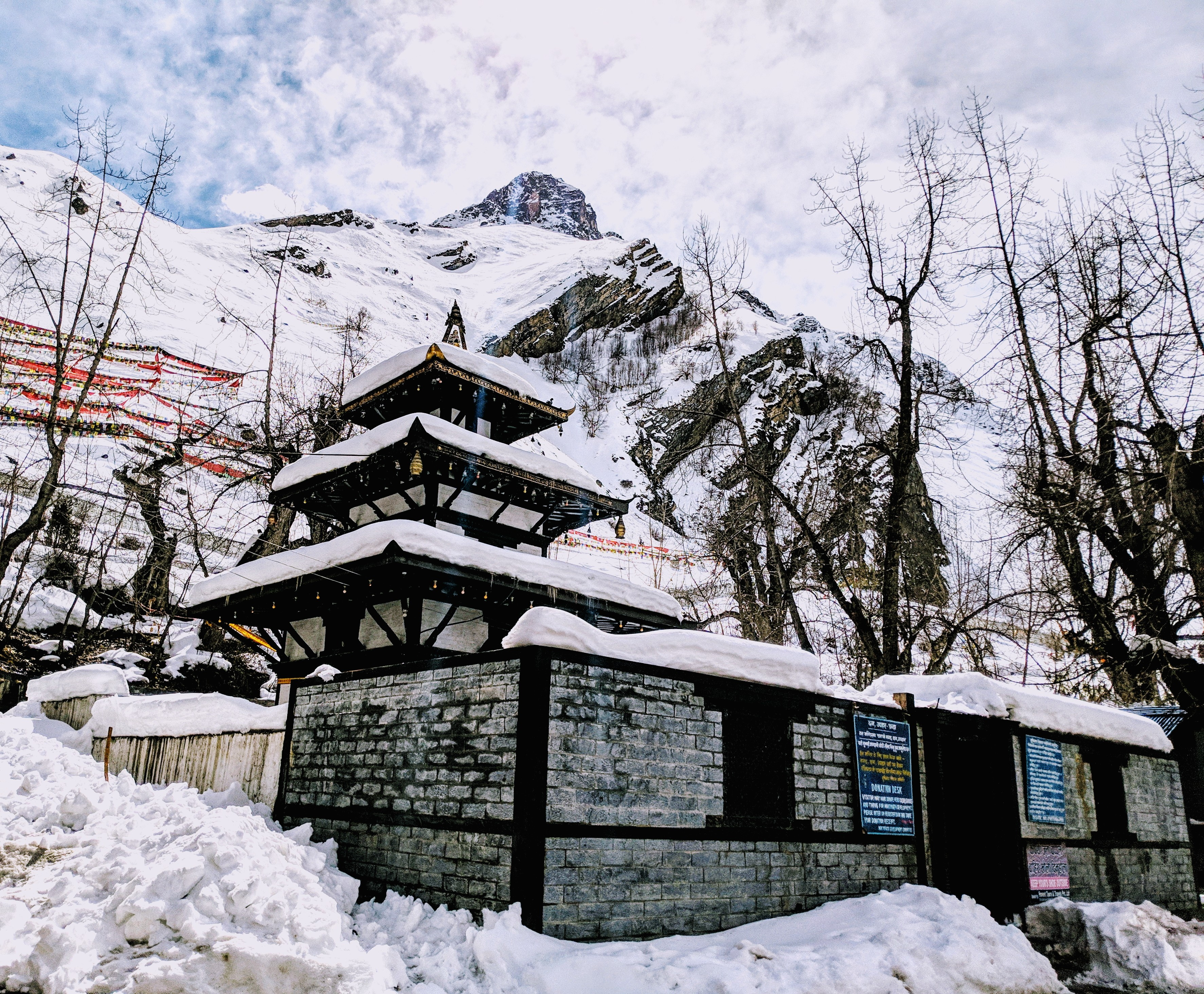
Muktinath Temple, (called Tiru Salakkiramam in Tamil) located in Mustang, Nepal is the only Divya Desams outside India and is one of the world's highest temples. Vishnu is venerated as the lord of liberation (moksha) at Muktinath.

The Tenkalai tradition brought into their fold artisanal castes into community-based devotional movements. Raman states, "it can almost be said that the Tenkalai represented the anti-caste tendencies while the Vadakalai school championed the cause of purity of the Vedic tenets." The Tenkalai held, adds Raman, that anyone can be a spiritual teacher regardless of caste.

The Vadakalai tradition states Sadarangani in contrast to Raman's views, were the liberal cousin of Tenkalai and therefore more successful in gaining devotees, while in southern Tamil lands Shaivism prospered possibly because of "Tenkalai school of Vaishnavism being narrow and orthodox in approach". The Vadakalai school not only succeeded in northern Tamil lands, she adds, but spread widely as it inspired the Bhakti movement in north, west and east India, bringing in Bhakti poet saints from "entire cross-section of class, caste and society".

=== Tenkalai ("southern art") - Manavala Mamunigal ===
The Ranganathaswamy Temple, Srirangam belongs to the Tenkalai/Thennacharya tradition and is considered as the foremost site of the Sri Vaishnava tradition. All the functionaries and priests are the descendants of the 74 disciples appointed by Ramanuja and belong to the Tenkalai line without any exceptions. In Sanskrit, the Tenkalai tradition is referred to as Dakshina Kalārya.

==== Characteristics ====
The Tenkalai place higher importance to Tamil slokas than Sanskrit, and lay more emphasis on the worship of Vishnu. The Tenkalai accept prapatti as the only means to attain salvation. They consider Prapatti as an unconditional surrender. The Thenkalais assert primacy to worship through the Prabandham, while holding the Vedas in equal esteem. They regard kaivalya (detachment, isolation) as an eternal position within the realm of Vaikuntha (Vishnu's 'eternal abode' or heaven), though it only exists at the outer most regions of Vaikuntha. They further say that God's seemingly contradictory nature as both minuscule and immense are examples of God's special powers that enable Him to accomplish the impossible.

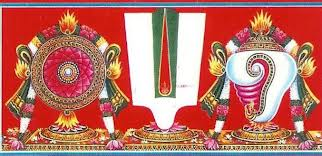
Tenkalai Sri Vaishnava Urdhva Pundram

According to the Tenkalai tradition, spiritually exalted individuals are not obligated to perform rituals such as Sandhyavandanam, as their liberation is already assured. However, they still observe these duties to set a moral example for others, while all other Brahmins are required to perform them. They don't allow the ringing of bells during worship. The Tenkalai forbid widows to shave (tonsure) their head, quoting the Parashara Smriti. while Vadakalais support the tonsure quoting the Manusmriti.

The Tenkalai frontal mark is a symbolic representation of the two feet of Vishnu. The two outer lines denote the soles of Vishnu's feet and the central line represents a lotus throne supporting the feet. The frontal mark is linked with the southern doctrine, denoting complete dependence upon divine grace, and the central line symbolizes Lakshmi.

==== Demographics ====
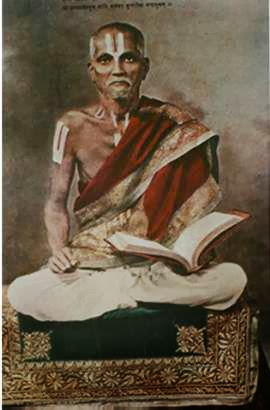
Sri Kanchi Prativadibhayankar Jagadguru Anantacharya Gaddi Swamiji, the spiritual preceptor of Tridandi Swami Vishwaksenacharyaji

The Tenkalai trace their lineage to Mudaliyandan, nephew of Ramanuja The Tenkalai are followers of the philosophy of Pillai Lokacharya, Ramanuja, and Manavala Mamuni, who is considered to be the reincarnation of Ramanuja by the Tenkalai. (Note: He is also known by many other names, such as Azhagiya Manavala Mamunigal, Sundhara Jamatara Muni, Ramya Jamatara Muni, Ramya Jamatara Yogi, Varavaramuni, Yathindhra pravanar, Kanthopayantha, Ramanujan ponnadi, Soumya jamathru yogindhrar, Koil Selva manavala mamunigal etc. He also has the titles Periya Jeeyar, Vellai Jeeyar, Visthavak sikhamani, Poi IllAtha Manavala Mamuni.)

Many of the main preceptors of Sri Vaishnavism and their descendants, before and after Ramanuja, belong to the Tenkalai denomination.

==== Notable Tenkalai people ====
- Srinivasa Ramanujan (1887–1920), Indian mathematician. (Note: Ramanujan's father belongs to Thenkalai sect while his mother belongs to Vadakalai sect)
- K.S. Krishnan (1898–1961), Indian physicist.
- B.K.S Iyengar (1918–2014), Founder of the "Iyengar Yoga" style of Yoga.
- Alasinga Perumal (1865–1909), Disciple of Swami Vivekananda and one of the founders of Brahmavadin which later became Vedanta Kesari.
- Sujatha (1935–2008), Writer, editor and engineer; key person behind development of the Electronic Voting Machine, for which he was awarded the VASVIK Industrial Research Award.
- Ariyakudi Ramanuja Iyengar (1890–1967), Renowned musician and architect of modern Carnatic music.
- J. Jayalalithaa (1948-2016), Renowned actress and six times chief minister of Tamil Nadu.

=== Vadakalai ("northern art") - Vedanta Desika ===
==== Characteristics ====
The Vadakalai are followers of Ramanuja and Vedanta Desika, who is the most important acharya of the Vadakalai sampradaya that foregrounds the recitation of Sanskrit Vedas. They lay more emphasis on the role of Lakshmi i.e. Sri, and uphold Sanskrit Vedas as the ultimate "Pramanam" or authority, although Ubhaya Vedanta (Note: The Sanskrit Vedas and the Dravida Veda, the composition of Alwars, which are held in equal esteem) is used to infer from and establish the doctrine of Vishishtadvaita. The Vadakalai infer that all of the Alvars compositions are derived from the Vedas, and believe that the latter is the ultimate source to reference and defend the doctrine. The Vadakalai lay emphasis on Vedic norms (Note: Also known as anushtaanams), while holding the Divya Prabandham in equal esteem.

The Vadakalai follow the Sanskrit Vedas, and the set of rules prescribed by the Manusmriti and Dharma Shastras. In Sanskrit the Vadakalai are referred to as Uttara Kalārya.

Traditionally, the Vadakalai believe in practising Karma yoga, Jnana yoga and Bhakti yoga, along with Prapatti, as means to attain salvation. Also, they consider Prapatti as an act of winning grace.

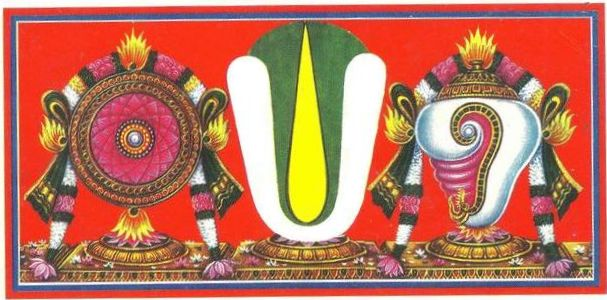
Vadagalai Sri Vaishnava Urdhva Pundram

The tilaka (urdhva pundra) mark of the Vadakalai men is a symbolic representation of Vishnu's right foot. Since Vishnu's right foot is believed to be the origin of the river Ganga, the Vadakalai contend that his right foot should be held in special veneration, and its sign impressed on the forehead. They also apply a central mark (sricharanam) to symbolise the goddess Lakshmi (Vishnu's wife), along with the tiruman (urdhva pundra). The Urdhva Pundra that is vertical and faces upwards denotes that it helps one in reaching Vaikuntha (the spiritual abode of Vishnu), and is also considered to be a warder of evil. Vadakalai women apply a red central mark along with namam only, symbolising Lakshmi seated on a lotus on their foreheads.

==== Guru Parampara ====
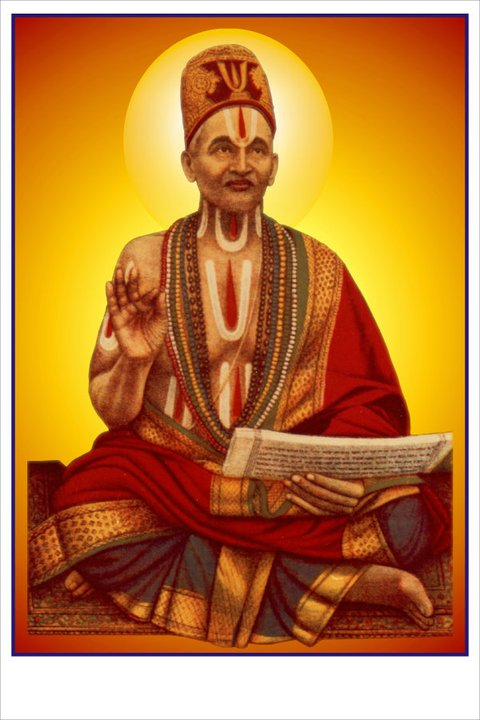
Sri Balmukundacharyaji Maharaj of Jhalariya Mutt, Didwana, Rajasthan

The Vadakalai sect traces its lineage back to Thirukurahi Piran Pillan, Kidambi Acchan and other direct disciples of Ramanuja, and considers Vedanta Desika to be the greatest Acharya of the post Ramanuja era.

The Vadakalai community consists of the following groups, based on the sampradaya followed:

- Pancharatra – Followers of Srimad Azhagiya Singar (Srinivasacharya) of Ahobila Mutt. The majority of Vadakalais belongs to this group. His disciples established Mutts at different places in North India, including Varanasi, Chitrakoot and Pushkar.
- Munitraya – Followers of Srimad Andavan of Andavan Ashramams, and Swayamacharyas. The Srirangam Srimad Andavan Ashramam, Poundarikapuram Andavan Ashramam, and most of the present-day Vadagalai 'svayam-acharya purusha' families are directly connected to this acharya parampara, and follow the worship and ritual patterns outlined by]Gopalarya Mahadesikan.

- Periya Andavan Srinivasa Mahadesikan;

- Parakala – They are mostly followers Brahmatantra Swatantra Jeeyar of Parakala Mutt, Mysore. Founded in 1399 by Brahmatantra Parakala Jeeyar, the peetadhipathis of this mutt are the preceptors of the royal family of Mysore Kingdom, Wadiyars. This has stayed as a royal mutt of the kings since then, and is a mutt for all Iyengars under this category.

==== Demographics ====
Traditionally, places of high importance with significant Vadakalai populations included Kanchipuram, Kumbakonam, Tiruvallur, Mysore and Kurnool district. However, today much of the people have moved to the big cities.

In Vrindavan, the Jankivallabh Mandir of Keshighat is a prominent Vadakalai Sri Vaishnava monastic institution and is associated with the spiritual lineage of the Ahobila Mutt. The present Azhagiya Singar has visited this well known institution in the past as well as recently. It is presently headed by Swami Sri Aniruddhacharyaji Maharaj.

In Rajasthan the Jhalariya Mutt is one of the most prominent Mutts and its branches have spread over to the neighbouring regions of Gujarat and Maharashtra. Sri Swami Balmukundacharyaji was a distinguished scholar and renowned Acharya of this Mutt.

==== Notable Vadakalai people ====
- Gopala Bhatta Goswami (1503–1578), born a Vadakalai Iyengar, one of the Six Goswamis of Vrindavan in Chaitanya Vaishnavism, and a highly revered Guru in ISKCON.
- Chakravarti Rajagopalachari (1878–1972), Indian politician and activist of the Indian independence movement. Premier of Madras (1937–1939), Governor of Bengal (1946–1948), Governor-General of India (1948–1950), Union Home Minister (1950–1952) and Chief Minister of Madras state (1952–1954). Founder of Swatantra party.
- C. V. Rungacharlu (1831–1883), Diwan of Mysore kingdom from 1881 to 1883.
- T. S. S. Rajan (1880–1953), Indian politician and freedom-fighter. Member of the Imperial Legislative Council (1934–1936), Minister of Public Health and Religious Endowments (Madras Presidency) (1937–1939), Minister of Food and Public Health (Madras Presidency) (1946–1951).
- Tirumalai Krishnamacharya (1888–1989), an influential Yoga teacher, healer and scholar.
- Agnihotram Ramanuja Tatachariar (1907–2008), renowned vedic scholar, and recipient of two national awards for his contribution to Vedic studies and Sanskrit literature.
- Krishnamachari Srikkanth (b. 1959), Indian Cricket Player
- R. Madhavan (b. 1970), Indian film actor

== Temples following Srivaishnava Sampradaya ==
- Divya Desams
- Abhimana Kshethrams
- Ranganathaswamy Temple, Srirangam
- Venkateswara Temple, Tirumala
- Andal Temple, Srivilliputtur
- Namagiri Thayar Sametha Narasimhaswamy perumal temple, Namakkal
- Sita Ramachandraswamy temple, Bhadrachalam
- Cheluvanarayana Swamy Temple
- Chakrapani Temple, Kumbakonam
- Sarangapani temple, Kumbakonam
- Ranganathaswamy Temple, Srirangapatna
- Ulagalantha Perumal Temple, Kanchipuram
- Parthasarathy Temple, Triplicane
- Bhu Varaha Swamy temple
- Varadharaja Perumal Temple, Kanchipuram
- Ashtabujakaram
- Adikesava Perumal Temple, Kanyakumari
- Pandava Thoothar Perumal Temple
- Rajagopalaswamy Temple, Mannargudi
- Ulagalantha Perumal Temple, Tirukoyilur
- Mudikondan Kothandaramar Temple
- Thirupullabhoothangudi Temple
- Kola Valvill Ramar Temple, Tiruvelliyangudi
- Vijayaraghava Perumal temple
- Ramaswamy Temple, Kumbakonam
- Yadadri Lakshmi Narasimha Swamy Temple
- Sri Lakshmi Narayana Temple, Sainikpuri, Secunderabad
- Ranganathaswamy Temple, Jiyaguda

== See also ==
- Satani
- Divya Desam
- Srivaishnava-Jaina conflict resolution inscription, Kalya

== Sources ==
- Bryant, Edwin Francis (2007), Krishna: A Sourcebook, Oxford University Press, ISBN 978-0-19-803400-1
- John Carman (1974). The Theology of Rāmānuja: An Essay in Interreligious Understanding. Yale University Press. ISBN 978-0-300-01521-8.
- John Carman; Vasudha Narayanan (1989). The Tamil Veda: Pillan's Interpretation of the Tiruvaymoli. University of Chicago Press. ISBN 978-0-226-09306-2.
- John Carman (1994). Majesty and Meekness: A Comparative Study of Contrast and Harmony in the Concept of God. Wm. B. Eerdmans. ISBN 978-0-8028-0693-2.
- Francis Clooney; Tony Stewart (2004). Sushil Mittal and Gene Thursby (ed.). The Hindu World. Routledge. ISBN 978-1-134-60875-1.
- Coward, Harold G. (2008), The perfectibility of human nature in eastern and western thought, SUNY Press, ISBN 9780791473368
- Dalal, Roshen (2010). Hinduism: An Alphabetical Guide. Penguin Books. ISBN 978-0-14-341421-6.
- Ranjeeta Dutta (2007). "Texts, Tradition and Community Identity: The Srivaisnavas of South India". Social Scientist. 35 (9/10): 22–43. JSTOR 27644238.
- Flood, Gavin D. (1996), An Introduction to Hinduism, Cambridge University Press
- Gough, Kathleen (1965), Rural Society in Southeast India, Cambridge University Press, ISBN 978-0-521-04019-8
- Srinivasan, S.; Mukherjee, D.P. (1976). "Inbreeding among Some Brahman Populations of Tamil Nadu". Human Heredity. 26 (2): 131–136. doi:10.1159/000152794. PMID 950239.
- Klostermaier, Klaus K. (2007), A Survey of Hinduism (3 ed.), State University of New York Press, ISBN 978-0-7914-7081-7
- Lester, Robert C (1966). "Rāmānuja and Śrī-vaiṣṇavism: The Concept of Prapatti or Śaraṇāgati". History of Religions. 5 (2): 266–282. doi:10.1086/462526. JSTOR 1062115. S2CID 162224010.
- Matchett, Freda (2000), Krsna, Lord or Avatara? The relationship between Krsna and Visnu: in the context of the Avatara myth as presented by the Harivamsa, the Visnupurana and the Bhagavatapurana, Surrey: Routledge, ISBN 978-0-7007-1281-6
- Mayeda, Sengaku (2006). A thousand teachings : the Upadeśasāhasrī of Śaṅkara. Motilal Banarsidass. ISBN 978-81-208-2771-4.
- Morgan, Kenneth W. (1953). The Religion of the Hindus. Motilal Banarsidass Publishing House. p. 228. ISBN 978-81-208-0387-9.
- Mumme, Patricia Y. (1987). "Grace and Karma in Nammāḻvār's Salvation". Journal of the American Oriental Society. 107 (2): 257–266. doi:10.2307/602834. JSTOR 602834.
- Sharma, Chandradhar (1994). A Critical Survey of Indian Philosophy. Motilal Banarsidass. ISBN 978-81-208-0365-7.
- Stoker, Valerie (2011). "Madhva (1238-1317)". Internet Encyclopedia of Philosophy.
- Tapasyananda (2011), Bhakti Schools of Vedanta, Ramakrishna Mission
- Thurston, Edgar; K. Rangachari (1909). "Brahmin". Castes and Tribes of Southern India Volume I – A and B. Madras: Government Press.
