= Pingali =

Pingali may refer to:

- Pingali Venkayya (died 1963), an Indian freedom fighter
- Pingali Nagendrarao (1901–1971), a Telugu scriptwriter, playwright and lyricist
- Pingali Suranna (fl. 16th century), a Telugu poet
- Pingali Lakshmikantamu (1894–1972), an Indian poet and writer
- Pingali, Parbhani, a village in Maharashtra state of India

== See also ==
- Pingal, a literary language of medieval India
- Pingala, an ancient Indian mathematician, traditionally identified as the brother of the Sanskrit grammarian Panini
- Pingala (nadi), an energy channel in yoga
