= Pillai Lokacharya =

Hindu philosopher and religious leader

- பிள்ளை லோகாசாரியார்
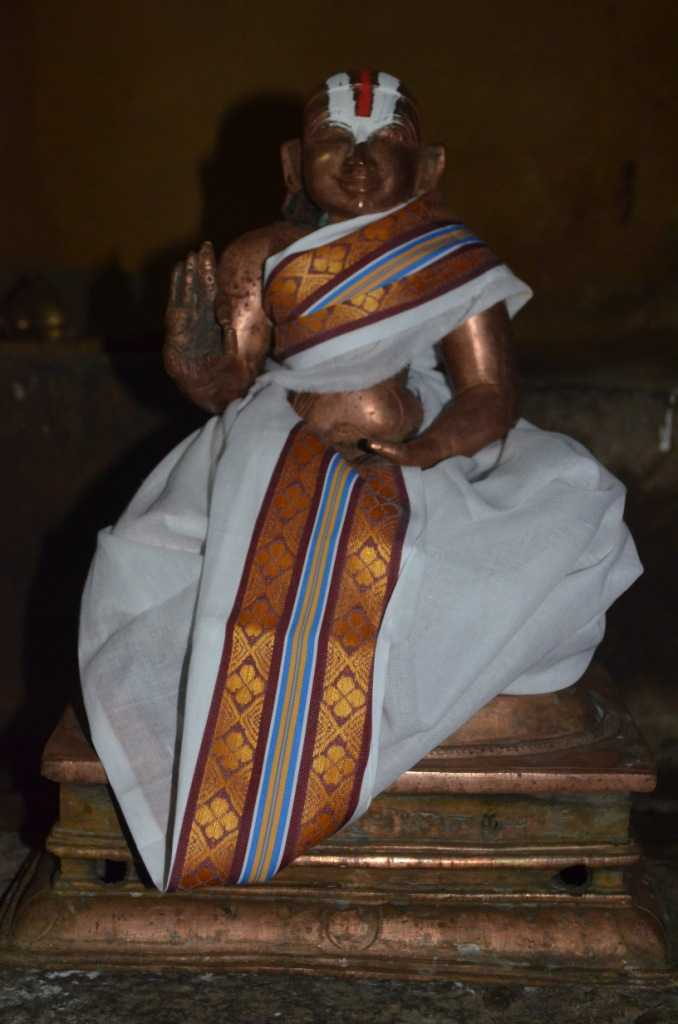
- Idol of Lokacharyar
- Title: Acharya

Personal life
- Born: 1205 CE Tiruchi
- Died: 1311 CE Madurai
- Parent: Vadakku Thiruveedhi Pillai (father)
- Notable work(s): Tattva-traya; Tattva-śekhara; Śrīvacana-bhūṣaṇa

Religious life
- Religion: Hinduism
- Denomination: Sri Vaishnavism
- Philosophy: Vishishtadvaita

Vāraṇādrīśa, more commonly referred to as Pillai Lokacharya (Tamil: பிள்ளை லோகாசாரியார்) (1205–1311 CE), was a prominent Sri Vaishnava leader and philosopher who authored several works important to Vishishtadvaita philosophy.

== Early life ==
Lokacharya is described to be a pupil of Kalijit and of his father, Vadakku Thiruveedhi Pillai. In the early 14th century CE, when Tiruvarangam, his hometown, was greatly affected by the invasion of Malik Kafur from the north, he left Tiruvarangam with Utsavara to protect Nampillai, the Utsavara of Aranganatha temple, from foreigners, and was enthroned in 1311 CE at Jyotishkudi near Yanimalai village, near Madurai at the age of 106.

== Philosophy ==
Lokacharya emphasized that divine grace is present even in unconscious or unintended acts. Lokacharya believed that God's grace is spontaneous (nirhetu, 'without cause'), and should be sought not only through bhakti or active devotion, but met by prapatti, a passive acceptance of God's grace that is supposed to be freely given. Bhakti was instructed to be of the marjara (cat) type, as opposed to the clinging monkey type of the school of Desika. By this, he meant that man has merely to lay down his burdens and give himself up completely to God, like a kitten held in its mother's mouth. No exertion was regarded to be needed on the part of the devotee; all that is required is complete and utter surrender. This reflects the views of the Alvars.

Lokacharya is the author of several works called Ashtadasa Rahasyangal (Eighteen Secrets) which were added to by his disciples and influenced a large following. His teachings shaped the Tenkalai school, which regards the Tamil Prabandham as canonical and emphasizes unconditional grace.

In his text of the Srivachana Bhushana, Lokacharya expresses his belief in the unconscious purification of human acts even in their physical and mental planes. A person may go round a temple or any spiritual environment, and may call another who is named after God. Pillai writes that God gives credit for his having been in a holy environment and for addressing the Lord by His name—“En uraicconnay, en peraicconnay”.

== Works ==
The Ashtadasa Rahasyangal included eighteen texts, most of which are composed in Manipravalam (a mix of Tamil and Sanskrit).

1. Mumukshupadi
2. Tatvatrayam
3. Artha Panjakam
4. Srivachana Bhushanam
5. Archiraadhi
6. Prameya Sekaram
7. Prapana Parithranam
8. Sara Sangraham
9. Samsara Samrajyam
10. Navarathnamaalai
11. Navavidha Sambandham
12. Yadhruchikapadi
13. Parandhapadi
14. Sriya Pathi Padi
15. Tatvashekaram
16. Thani Dvayam
17. Thani Charamam
18. Thani Pranavam

Three Sanskrit works of Pillai Lokacharya that have been identified are Tattva-traya, Tattva-Shekara, and Srivachana Bhushana.

=== Tattva-traya ===
The Tattva-traya is an important work of the Sri Vaishnava tradition that explains the nature of the inanimate (acit), souls, God, and their mutual relationships.

=== Tattva-Shekara ===
The Tattva-Shekhara is a text with four chapters. It draws on scriptural sources to argue that Narayana is the highest God, and the ultimate reality. It examines the nature of self through scriptural testimony and identifies self-surrender to God as the ultimate goal. It explains that the "ultimate summum bonum (puruṣartha)" consists in the loving service (kaiṅkarya) to God, arising from devotion (prīti-kārita) and based on an understanding of the self and divine nature in all his beauty, majesty, power, and excellence.

=== Srivachana Bhushana ===
The Srivachana Bhushana consists of 484 sentences, longer than sutra-style phrases but shorter than philosophical sentences. In sutra 39, Pilla Lokacharya uses a water-based metaphor to explain the varying accessibility of the Lord's forms. He highlights the arcavatara (image form) as the most accessible manifestation of divine grace. He compares the Inner Controller (antaryamin) to "water deep down in the earth", the emanation (vyuha) to a "sea of milk", and incarnations and manifestations (vibhava) to "rivers in floods", while describing the image form (arcavataras) as "deep pools [that are easily accessible]".

== Death ==
Pillai Lokacharya is said to have fallen ill due to a fall from a nearby hill (today known as Yanamalai) and died in 1311 CE. In his final teachings, he advised his disciples, such as Koorakuloththama Dasa and Vilanjsolai Pillai, that Srisailesa was working for the king at Madurai, and that they should bring him back into the Sri Vaishnava fold. His samadhi temple still exists near Narasimha temple at Othakadai, near Madurai.

According to legend, as he was dying, he started touching the ants and other such insects near him, with the belief that all those animals that were touched by a Sri Vaishnava would reach Vaikuntha, the abode of Vishnu. Pillai Lokacharya is said to have lived to 118 years.

== Legacy ==
One of Pillai Lokacharya's best known disciples was Manavala Mamunigal, a theologian within the Sri Vaishnava tradition, who is revered in the Tenkalai (southern) denomination.

== See also ==
- Ramanuja

== Sources ==
- Dasgupta, Surendranath (1940). A History of Indian Philosophy: Volume 3. Cambridge University Press. ISBN 978-0-521-04780-7.
- Narayanan, Vasudha (31 December 1985), "3. Arcāvatāra: On Earth as He Is in Heaven", Gods of Flesh, Gods of Stone, Columbia University Press, pp. 53–68, doi:10.7312/wagh91314-006, ISBN 978-0-231-88312-2
- Valpey, Kenneth Russell (18 April 2006). Attending Krishna's Image: Chaitanya Vaishnava Murti-seva as Devotional Truth. Routledge. ISBN 978-1-134-17545-1.
