= Agnihotram Ramanuja Tatachariar =

Agnihotram Ramanuja Tatachariar (1907–2008) was a renowned Vedic scholar of Vaishnava sect of Hinduism. He claimed to be a descendant of Nathamuni hailing from Kumbakonam. He was recipient of two national awards for his contribution to Vedic studies and Sanskrit literature.

== Books ==
- Sidhanta Ratnavali (Saraswati Mahal Library-Tanjavore)
- Rshyashrunga Samhitai (Saraswati Mahal Library-Tanjavore)
- Yaskarin Nirukta (Saraswati Mahal Library Tanjavore)
- Vedakalina Janatantra Sthanani (Tirumala Tirupati Devastanam Publications)
- Eternal Relevance of Vedas (Tirumala Tirupati Devastanam Publications)
- Gayatri Meditation
- Azhvargalum Vedangalum
- Varalatril Pirantha Vainavam
- Hindu Culture (Bhavans)
- Women in Vedas (Yogakshema Trust)
- Indhu Madham Engay Pogirathu (Nakeeran Publications)
- Sadungalin Kadhai - Nakeeran Publications (Indhu Madham Engay Pogirathu - Part 2)
