= Samashrayana =

Hindu initiation ceremony

- Samkhya: Kapila
- Yoga: Patanjali
- Vaisheshika: Kaṇāda, Prashastapada
- Secular: Valluvar

The samashrayana (Sanskrit: समाश्रयणम्, romanized: Samāśrayaṇam) or the panchasamskara (Sanskrit: पञ्चसंस्कार, romanized: Pañcasaṃskāra) is a Hindu sacrament generally associated with the Sri Vaishnava tradition. It consists of five rites of initiation performed by a shishya (disciple) to be formally initiated into the tradition by an acharya (preceptor).

== Etymology ==
Samāśrayaṇam is Sanskrit for, "taking refuge with God".

== Description ==
The samashryana consists of the five rites according to Sri Vaishnava tradition:

1. Tapa - The embossing of the impression of Vishnu's Sudarshana Chakra (discus) on the right shoulder of the initiate and the Panchajanya (conch) on the left shoulder of the initiate.
2. Puṇḍra - The application of the Vaishnava tilaka, the urdhva pundra, on twelve sacred locations of the body associated with Vishnu.
3. Nāma - The introduction of the suffix dasan (servant) to the initiate's new name, offered by the preceptor.
4. Mantra - The teaching of the Ashtakshara mantra and other sacred Vaishnava incantations.
5. Yajña - The instruction of the proper method of worshipping God.
