= Urdhva Pundra =

U-shaped mark usually worn on forehead by Vaishnava Hindus

The Urdhva Pundra (Sanskrit: ऊर्ध्वपुण्ड्र, romanized: Ūrdhvapuṇḍra, lit. 'elevated mark') is a tilaka worn by Vaishnavas as an indication of their affiliation with Vishnu. It is generally worn on the forehead, but may also be worn on other parts of the body such as the shoulders. The markings are made either as a daily ritual, or on special occasions, and denote the particular sampradaya, or the lineage to which the devotee belongs. The different Vaishnava sampradayas each have their own distinctive style of tilaka based on the siddhanta of their particular lineage. The general tilaka design is of two or three vertical lines resembling the letter U or Y, which represent the lotus feet of Vishnu.

== Literature ==
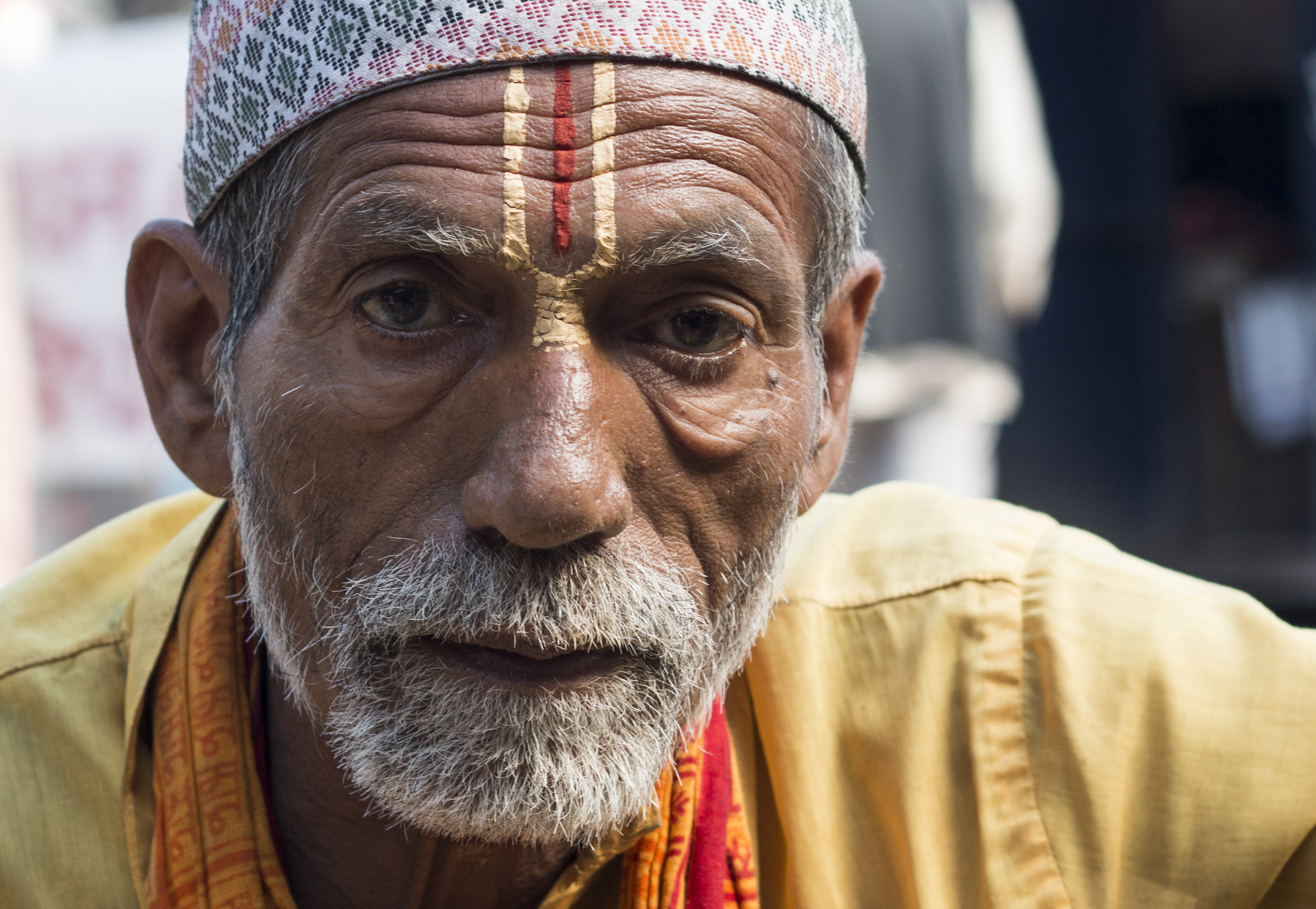
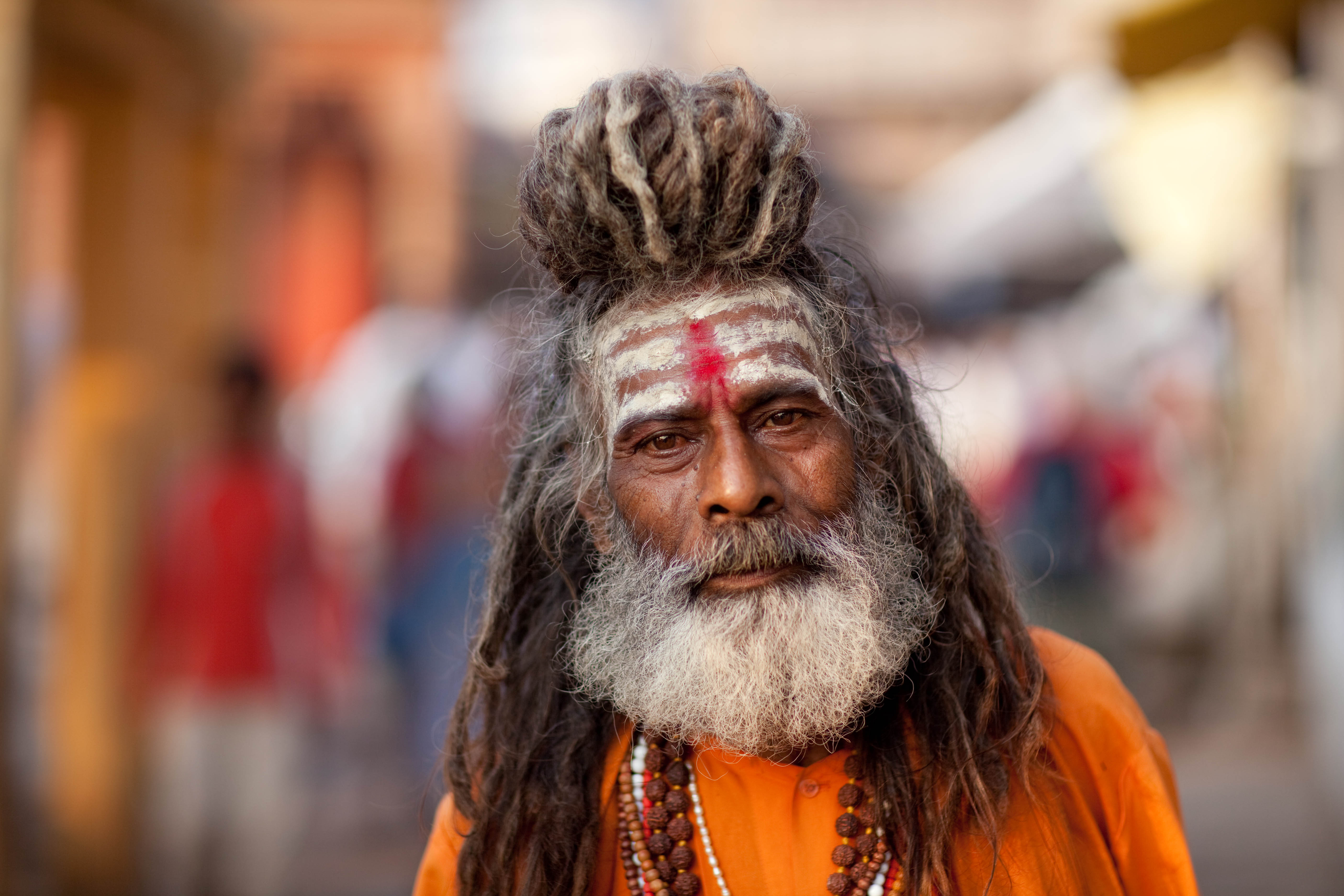
Left: A Vaishnava Hindu with Tilaka Urdhva Pundra.
Right: A Shaiva Hindu with Tilaka Tripundra

The Urdhava Pundra has historically been associated with the Vaishnava tradition, just as the Tripundra has been associated with the Shaiva tradition.

The Padma Purana explains the theological significance of this symbol:

May the Pāvamānya (hymns) purify me with the thousand-edged disc with which they always protect themselves. The disc of the Creator is bright with metal plates and golden. We knowing the hymn purify it (already) purified by it. The unaging disc with the felly is the eye of the noble one. Having put it on gods reached a high position. Therefore, (the marks of) the weapons should be duly put on particularly by brāhmaṇas, especially by Viṣṇu’s devotees. The noble one of a pure heart, who having the Ūrdhvapuṇḍra (perpendicular marks of sandal on the forehead) and the mark of the disc, meditates on Viṣṇu’s position, by means of singing the hymn always reaches (god Viṣṇu) higher than the highest always remaining in his heart.

— Padma Purana, Chapter 224

The Vasudeva Upanishad, a Vaishnava text, explains the significance of the three vertical lines in the Urdhva Pundra Tilaka, offering a number of interpretations:

To be a reminder of the Vedic scriptures - Rigveda, Yajurveda, and Samaveda;

The three worlds Bhu, Bhuva, Svar;

The three phonemes of Om - A, U, M;

The three states of consciousness - awake, dream sleep, deep sleep;

The three realities - Maya, Brahman, and Atman;

The three bodies - Sthula, Sukshma, and Karana.

The Skanda Purana also offers some details regarding the mark:

Listen to the marks of the devotees attentively, O Mother. It is a secret, O Dharaṇī. They have permanent marks of conch and discus on the pair of arms. Their special characteristic is Ūrdhvapuṇḍra (sectarian mark in a vertical V-like form) with a gap in the middle. Others have twelve such Puṇḍras on the forehead, heart, neck, belly, two sides, two elbows, two arms, back and back of the neck. When they apply the mark they recite the twelve names beginning with ‘Keśava’ and ending with ‘Vāsudeva’ and say ‘Obeisance to you’. When they apply it on the head, they say ‘Vāsudeva’.

— Skanda Purana, Book 2, Section 1, Chapter 6

== Association with Vishnu's names ==
In Vaishnava tradition, the Urdhva Pundra is applied on different regions of an individual's body, and its application requires one to ritually invoke the various names of Vishnu. This is also referred to as nama. The Chandogya Upanishad sheds some light on this concept in the form of an order in which the mark is applied, correlating each with an epithet of the preserver deity:

- Keshava - Forehead
- Narayana - Stomach
- Madhava - Heart
- Govinda - Neck
- Vishnu - Right-section of stomach
- Madhusudana - Middle of right hand
- Trivikrama - Left ear
- Vamana - Left-section of stomach
- Sridhara - Left hand
- Hrishikesha - Right ear
- Padmanabha - Hind
- Damodara - Nape
- Vasudeva - Head

== Traditional variations ==
=== Sri Vaishnavism ===
Sri-tilaka

The mark here is called the namam or the sricharanam. Members of the Sri Vaishnava tradition wear the tilaka with the two outer lines representing the feet of Narayana, and the red line in the middle that represents his consort, Lakshmi. A curvature upon the top bridge of the nose indicates that the wearer belongs to the Tenkalai denomination. Because the Sri Vaishnava tradition accords a high place to Lakshmi, and because they approach Narayana through Lakshmi, their tilaka reflects this process of surrender, known as saranagati (or sometimes also prapatti).

The women of the Sri Vaishnava tradition, especially the ones who hail from the Iyengar community, wear a different tilaka from the men. The red line that represents Lakshmi is worn prominently upon the length of their forehead to highlight their femininity, adorned with a miniature white curvature at the base of the design.

==== Iyengar tradition ====
In South India's Iyengar community, there are two forms of tilakas present, referred to as the namam. There exist two components of this mark present in both denominations:

- Tiruman (sacred clay) - The white, lateral symbolism that represents the feet of Vishnu
- Sricharanam (sacred feet) - The yellow/red central symbolism that represents the presence of Lakshmi

===== Tenkalai =====
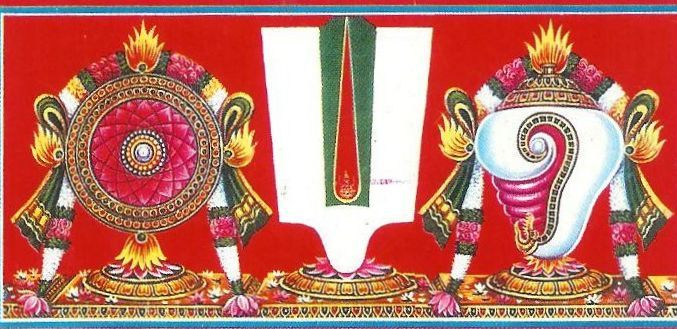
Tenkalai Namam

The Tenkalai namam is a Y-shaped design that incorporates two vertical white lines upon the forehead that intersect upon the bridge of the nose, where they are aligned by the wearer. This is representative of the feet of Vishnu. A red line that is usually applied with kumkuma is worn in its midst as a representation of Lakshmi.

===== Vadakalai =====
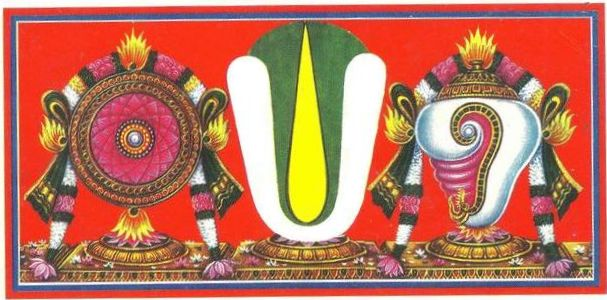
Vadakalai Namam

The Vadakalai are among the two denominations of the Iyengar community of Tamil Brahmins. The Vadakalai namam is a U-shaped design that incorporates two curved lines upon the forehead. As in the Tenkalai namam, this is representative of the feet of Vishnu. A yellow line that is usually applied with a turmeric paste is worn in its midst as a representation of Lakshmi.

=== Vallabha sampradaya ===
tilaka

In the Vallabha tradition, or the Rudra sampradaya, the tilaka worn is a double vertical red line which is rounded at the base. This "U" shape represents Krishna's lotus feet. The materials used to make their tilakas are derived from saffron plants.

=== Madhva sampradaya ===
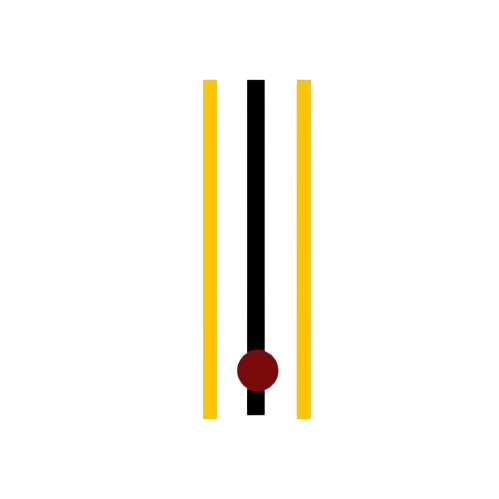
Angara-Akshate

The Madhva Sampradaya mark two vertical lines with Gopichandana representing Vishnu's 'lotus feet'. In between a vertical black line is made from the daily coal of the dhupa (incense). In this sampradaya, worship is done to Narayana or Krishna daily. The coal left after offering incense is used to mark the black line. This is called as angara. Those who are wearing this line have finished the Devara Puja (worship). Underneath the black line, red dot is added to indicate that one has finished eating their lunch. This dot is called as akshate. It is the ash of the banana tree flower petal mixed with turmeric paste. The shape of angara-akshate is like that of a gada. It is supposed to be Pranadeva Sannidhi (have the presence of Vayu Devaru). Those who did not perform daily worship to Narayana wear the simple two line tilaka only.

=== Gaudiya Vaishnavism ===

In the Gaudiya Vaishnava sampradaya, the tilaka is usually made out of mud from Vrindavan. The main tilaka is basically identical to the Madhva tilaka. Below the two lines, on the bridge of the nose is the shape of a tulsi leaf, while other Vaishnava groups may instead feature the shape of the neem or asoka leaf. The slight difference arose due to the emphasis on direct devotional service such as hearing from the shastras and glorifying the Lord in accordance with Srimad-Bhagavatam. As such, the black line made from the ash of the fire sacrifice is not included. As per Sri Hari Bhakti Vilasa (4.211), the tilaka is a U that begins from the beginning of the nose which is technically 1/3rd the distance from the base to the tip. In due course of time, this original tilaka was modified to suit various divisions and sects.

=== Nimbarka sampradaya ===
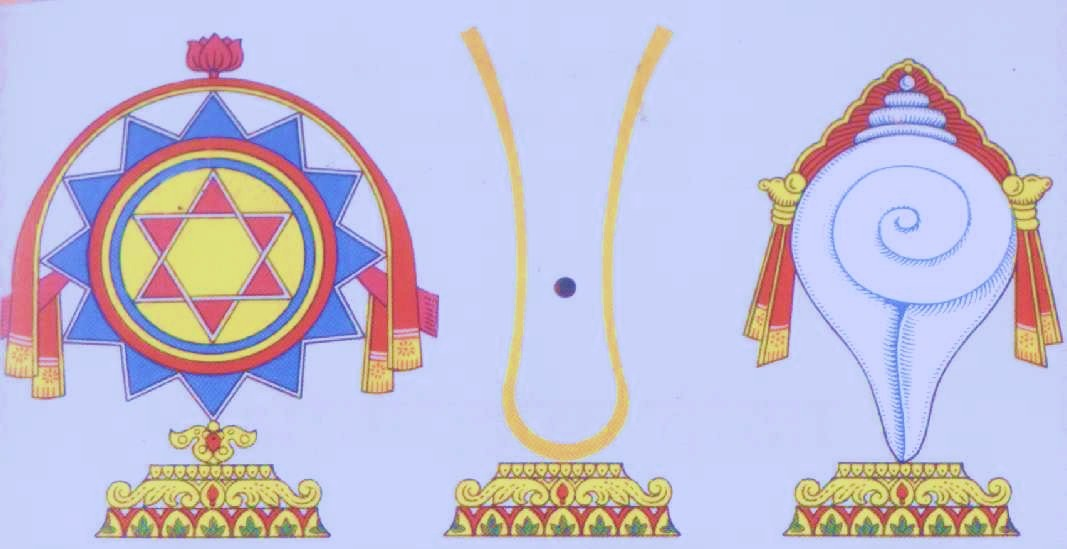
The Nibarka tilaka between the Shankha and Chakra

In Nimbarka Sampradaya, the tilaka is made of Gopi-Chandana (the clay from Gopi Kunda lake in Dwarka, Gujarat), as described in the Vasudeva Upanishad. It starts at the bridge of the nose and continues as two vertical lines to the top of the forehead. This is said to represent the temple of God. Within these lines, between the eyebrows is a black dot, made from the slate found in Barsana, Uttar Pradesh, the sacred birthplace of Radha. This is said to represent God as Radha and Krishna together. This tilaka personifies the tenets of the Sampradaya, that God is Radha and Krishna together, none else. It is supposed to have been first given to Nimbarka at the time of his initiation by the sage, Narada. The tilaka is first given to an initiate by their guru at the time of initiation, and after this, daily the devotee will remember his guru before he adorns the tilaka on his head.

=== Swaminarayan Sampradaya ===
Udharva Marka, illustrated

In the Swaminarayan Sampradaya, the urdhva pundra tilaka, also known as the tilaka chandlo, is composed of two elements: a U-shaped tilaka made of sandalwood paste and a chandlo (circle) made of kumkuma (vermillion) in the center. It is applied before the morning puja.

According to the Swaminarayan Gadis, the symbol represents Lakshmi, the goddess of wealth and fortune, living in the heart of Swaminarayan wherein the tilaka represents the lotus feet of Krishna, the supreme being, and the chandlo stands for Lakshmi. The BAPS interpret the tilaka chandlo to indicate the bhakta-bhagavan mode of worshipping Paramatma along with his ideal devotee, the Gunatit Sadhu. Swaminarayan proclaimed that all devotees should wear the mark on 13 February 1821 during the Holi festival in Panchala, near Junagadh, Gujarat, after demonstrating the tilaka chandlo on Gunatitanand Swami.

== See also ==
- Hindu philosophy
- Vibhuti
- Tilaka
- Paklei Namsa
