= Arthamuru =

- Village
- Interactive map of Arthamuru
- Location in Andhra Pradesh, India Arthamuru (India)
- Coordinates: 16.87°N 81.93°E
- Country: India
- State: Andhra Pradesh
- District: East Godavari
- Mandal: Mandapeta

Population (2011)
  - Total: 6,326

Languages
  - Official: Telugu
- Time zone: UTC+5:30 (IST)
- PIN: 533340
- Vehicle registration: AP

Arthamuru is a village in Mandapeta mandal, located in East Godavari district of the Indian state of Andhra Pradesh.
