= Hrishikesha =

Epithet of the Hindu god Vishnu

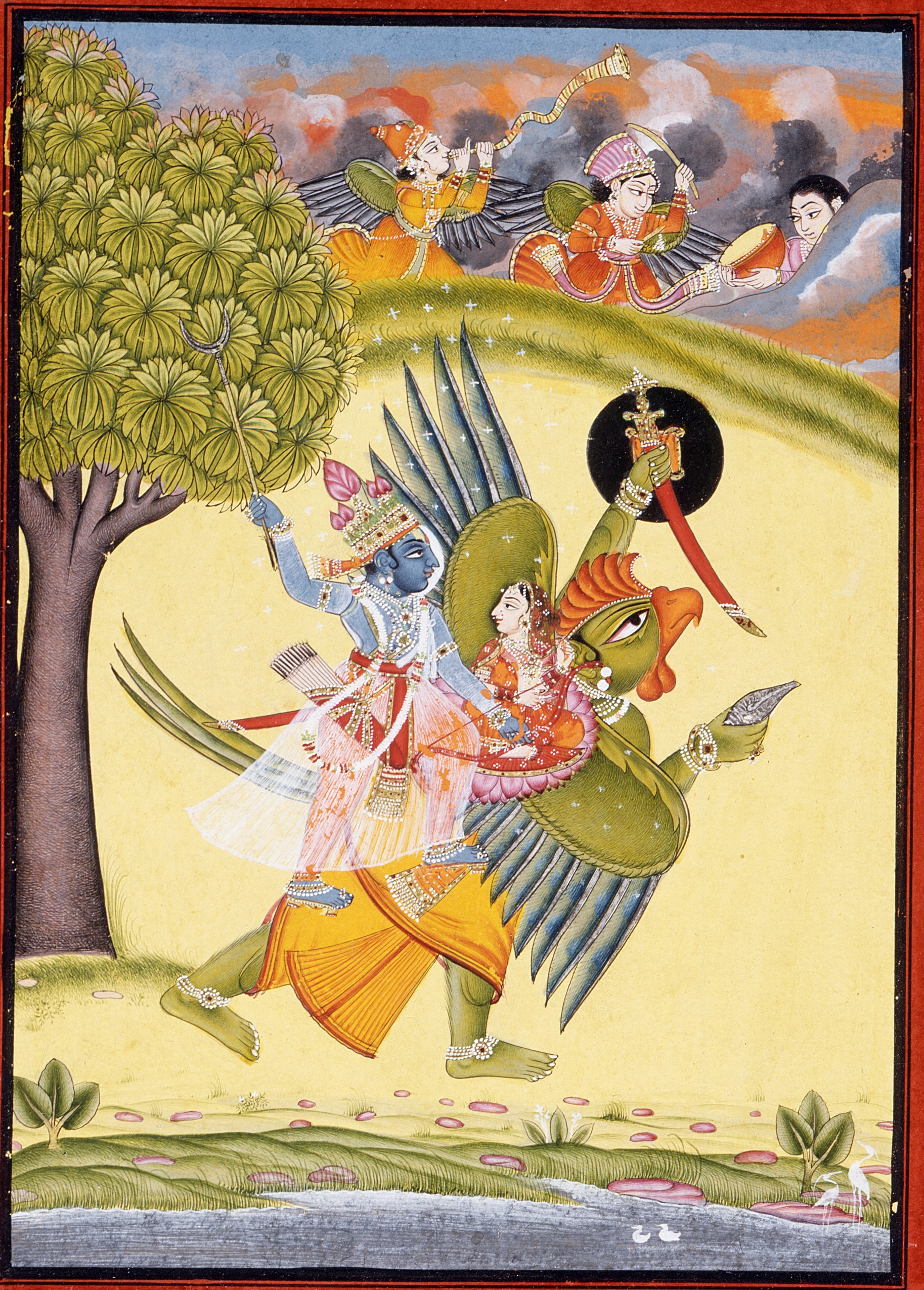
- Hrishikesha and Lakshmi riding on Garuda
- Devanagari: हृषीकेश
- Sanskrit transliteration: Hṛṣīkēśa
- Affiliation: Vishnu
- Abode: Vaikuntha
- Mantra: ॐ नमो हृषीकेश नाराणाय नमः Ōm namō hr̥ṣīkēśa nārāyaṇāya namaḥ
- Weapon: Sudarshana Chakra
- Mount: Garuda, Adishesha
- Consort: Lakshmi

Hrishikesha (Sanskrit: हृषीकेश; IAST: Hṛṣīkēśa) lit. ''lord of the senses'' is an epithet of the Hindu preserver deity Vishnu. It is the 47th name in the Vishnu Sahasranama. According to Adi Shankara's commentary on the Vishnu Sahasranama, the name has several meanings:

- The lord of the senses.
- He under whose control the senses subsist.
- He whose hair consists of the rays of the sun and the moon, which gives joy to the world.

Rishikesh is a city in Uttarakhand state of India named after Hrishikesha.
