= Bengaluru Ganesh Utsava =

Indian festival

- Locations: Bengaluru, India
- Inaugurated: September 2, 1962

Bengaluru Ganesh Utsava is an eleven-day Hindu utsava dedicated to Ganesha, held annually in Bengaluru. Musicians, theatre groups and ballet troupes are invited to stage programs.

== History ==
=== 1960s-1970s ===
The festival was inaugurated as the Ganesha Festival on 2 September 1962 by the then-home minister Shri R M Patil at the D V G road Mallikarjuna temple lane. Veteran vocal singers Shri P Kalinga Rao, Bengaluru Latha, and Shri Gururajuludas of Mandya entertained the audience.

During 1960s and 1970s, the festival was led by Shri Paramashivanna and Shri Mohan Shet as presidents.

In 1974, South Indian singing legend Dr. P B Srinivas and iconic music director M Ranga Rao performed. The next year, S P Balasubramanyam performed.

In 1976, the festival place was moved to near the Mallikarjuna temple premises, in an effort to improve traffic jams.

=== 2000s ===
In 2003, responsibility for the festival was handed over to the younger generation. Led by A Mariyappa's son S M Nandish, the transfer of responsibility went smoothly. Obalesh and Chandrashekar, sons of G K Gopal, Nataraj s/o Veerabhadraiah, Vasanth s/o Satyanarayana, Krishna s/o G K Obaiah, Subramanyam s/o V Muthu were the young brigade delegated to take forward the activities of the festivals. S M Nandish and his team brought in professionalism and brand equity to the Utsava. Team mobilized youths, acknowledged elders advice, reciprocated to contemporary issues and concerns. “These things lead us to success” says S M Nandish. With its ever growing popularity, increase in audience numbers, venue of the Utsava was shifted again in 2007 to A P S college grounds.

In 2008, the Ganesha festival was rebranded as Bengaluru Ganesha Utsava or BGU. Alongside the rebrand, leadership sought to appeal to youth by inviting popular celebrities.

=== 2010s ===
The utsava celebrated its 50th year in 2012 . Several entertainment programs were planned. The 49th year celebration had the Bollywood stars Karina Kapoor, Govinda, Sushant Singh Rajput, Ankita Lokhande, singer Shaan, and our own Ramesh Aravind. To take the news of the festival to entire Bengaluru, advertisements were shown in PVR theatres. Large billboards, measuring 50–60 feet, containing all program details, were put up on Meenakshi Mall, Phoenix Mall, Lalbagh West Gate, DVG Road and Commercial Street. The golden jubilee celebration started with 'Rangarang' Rangoli competition. In the same year, the act of 500 Indian classical dancers performing simultaneously was recorded in 'Limca Book of Records'.

Many prestigious singers, dancers and artists performed during 2012 Ganesha Utsava. The Golden Jubilee celebrations were inaugurated by Dr. K.J. Yesudas. The doyen of music, Sri Ilaya Raaja performed to a full National College ground. Similar performances were from famous playback singers of Bollywood, Sri Sonu Nigam and Sri Shankar Mahadevan. Famous music composer, Sri Harikrishna, entertained the crowd with Kannada Film songs. Known famously as 'DSP', Sri Devi Sri Prasad sang Kannada, Telugu, Tamil and Hindi film songs. One of Bengaluru's favourite singers, Smt M.D.Pallavi, sang devotional songs and popular film songs. The duo of Kathak dancers of Bengaluru origin, Smt Nirupama and founder of Abhinava School of Dance, Sri Rajendra, presented a fantasy musical in Disney style 'Rama Katha Vismaya'. Sri Shivamani gave a rousing performance on the drums. In a program titled 'An evening of fusion and film songs', Kannada playback singer Vijay Prakash presented a medley of 50 Kannada songs, gaining lot of praise from the appreciative crowd.

=== 2020s ===
During the COVID-19 pandemic, festival organizers put together 'Live' programs on YouTube and Facebook. During the first lockdown from 5 April to 17 May 2020, the programs were conducted every day for 43 days and included performances of over 60 artists. An estimated 28 lakh people world over enjoyed the programs.

Festival organizers conducted programs in Dayananda Sagar College Auditorium, with no spectators. The programs were broadcast live via Facebook and YouTube and watched by lakhs of people worldwide. In all, around 450 artists participated. Similarly, Poojas were performed with splendor, as usual. Adequate precautions as demanded by the conditions were taken.

In 2021, the festival returned to in-person events, with several precautionary measures adopted. Around 400 artists participated in the cultural programs. All poojas were conducted with usual fervor. To add to it, Pallakki Utsava was introduced for the first time.

== Religious elements ==
During the festival, multiple poojas for Vighnavinashaka Ganesha are performed, including:

- Panchamruta Abhisheka
- Aarati
- Pushpaalankara Seve
- Modakahara Seve
- Kadubinahara Seve
- Ganapati Homa
- Ekadasha Rudrabhisheka (Mondays)
- Girija Kalyana (Mondays)
- Ga-Kara Ganapathi Pooja (Tuesdays)
- Rangapooje

Kumkuma-archane, Sri Ganapati, Navagraha, Mrutyunjaya, and Durga Homa, Nitya Prasada Vitarane, and Sri Satyanarayana Pooje are also performed. Each day, different prasada are prepared and distributed, and prasada counters are always open at the three doors of the Pandal. Similarly, Sri Satyanarayana Pooja is followed by Sarvajanika Anna Dasoha.

Before Ganesha Aarati every evening, more than 10,000 oil lamps were lit in the Pandal, APS college ground and the streets around Mallikarjuna Temple.

=== Ganesha Visarjane ===
People from various corners of Bengaluru participate in Ganesha Visarjane procession. A specially decorated chariot of Ganesha leads the procession. This chariot is followed by several types of dancers, special musical instruments, rural games of Daandi, Kolata, Kilu Kudure, Chande, Viragase, Bhadrakali, Kamsale, Nandikolu, Patada Kunita, Dollu Kunita, - all of which depict our rich culture. Accompanied by strains of Clarinet and pearl Pallakki containing Ganesha, the procession proceeding across main streets, decorated with sparkling bright lights, is a treat to watch. Devotees erupt with joy in the presence of their favourite god, Ganesha. Around 25,000 laddus are distributed amongst devotees during the procession. To prevent water pollution, the Sangha has stopped the Visarjane in Yediyur Lake, where Visarjane used to take place before. Instead, clean fresh water is brought in large Tipper, and the water after Visarjane is used in agricultural fields at a later date. 54th year onwards, ecofriendly clay Ganesha was being disbanded in a small water tank in a devotee's house in NR Colony and the water later used for watering the plants.. Since the processions were prohibited due to Covid during 58th and 59th year, Ganesha Visarjane was done inside Mallikarjuna temple compound. A small pond was dug in Mallikarjuna Temple compound and Visarjane was made to this small pond. This Visarjane procession, though a short trip from the Pandal to the Pond, is no less a spectacle.

== Programs ==
=== Aromas of Karnataka ===
The 'Aromas of Karnataka' program aims to provide healthy desi food to the festival participants. The program was established from the 46th Utsava onwards.

Recipes served include Neer Dosa and Vada from Mangaluru, Jowar Roti and Hucchellu Chutney from Bijapur, Gokak's Karadantu, Masala Dosa from Mysore, Halasina Kadubu of Malenadu, Davanagere's Benne Dose, and Mirchi Mandakki of Ballari.

The festival is eco-friendly by being plastic-free.

=== Rangarang ===
The festival arranged the 'Rangarang' program, which celebrates rangoli, during its 48th and 50th editions. Several main roads of Bengaluru were closed to make way for the competition, which included hundreds of participants.

The program in the 48th year was arranged in two phases. The first phase on 8 September 2010, arranged in APS College grounds, had 556 contestants. Around one hundred were selected for their effort in first round. On 19 September, these 100 contestants participated in the second and final round arranged on DVG Road. The winners of this round took home gold weighing 100, 50 and 25 grams. The 48th year Rangoli competition was sponsored by Sri Sai Gold Palace.

The success of the 48th year Rangrang Rangoli Utsava encouraged the Sangha to arrange the same in its 50th year also. The first phase, arranged on 19 August 2012 on Malleshwaram 8th Cross, Margosa Road and Malleshwaram Play Ground, had 359 contestants. The second and final phase was arranged on Commercial Street. Closing the crowded streets of Margosa Road, Malleshwaram 8th Cross and Commercial Street was a difficult task. On the streets which transacted huge business every day, holding the Rangoli competition was made possible, thanks to the cooperation of the shop-owners on these streets. The winners got gold weighing 100, 50 and 25 grams, sponsored by Kandala Jewellers.

=== Giant laddu ===
In 2014, more than 100 people prepared a 6000 kg laddu, made with 1500 kg chickpeas, 1700 kg ghee, 500 kg dry grapes, and 2400 kg sugar. At the end of the festival, it was distributed as Prasada to the devotees.

=== Sand Ganesha ===
An idol of 30 feet tall Sand Ganesha, along with Shiva and Parvati, was built beside Mallikarjuna temple of Basavanagudi, by artisans from Orissa. Thousands came to have a darshan on all days of the festival.

== Achievements, awards and world records ==
=== Guinness Book of Records ===
57th Ganesha Utsava had a special campaign - workshop on making eco-friendly clay Ganesha. The aim of the program was environment protection by reducing the pollutants that go in to the making of Ganesha idol. The workshop facilitated the eco-friendly Ganesha made by hand being taken home by the maker for worship. The seeds of Tulasi, flowers and fruits, kept inside the idol while making clay Ganesha, grow into plants after Visarjane. Ganesha, Lord of Earth, is made out of mud and is returned to mud, without any environmental impact. Around 2800 people of all ages participated in the program arranged on 25 August 2019 on National College Ground, Basavanagudi. The clay and other implements needed for making Ganesha was provided by the Sangha. The program was a grand success, registering the Sangha's name in Guinness Book as 'the most people sculpting with clay simultaneously'. This has encouraged the Sangha to arrange the ecofriendly clay Ganesha making campaign on a very large scale during its 60th year.

=== Maharaja of Mysore in BGU ===
During the 55th Utsava, 50 senior exponents of Karnatak music were honored by the Sangha, for their achievements in their respective fields. The Maharaja of Mysore Samsthana, Sri Yaduveera Krishnadutta Chamaraja Wodeyar, participated in the function and honored the artists.

=== Gold-Plated Silver Ornaments for Ganesha and Silver Ganesha ===
In the 56th year, devotees of Ganesha, owners of 'Rajahans Printers', Sri Balachander and family, presented Ganesha with gold-plated silver crown, hand and foot, in all weighing 20 kg. These ornaments were put on Ganesha by the CEO and Administrator of Sringeri Mutt, Padma Sri awardee, Guru Seva Dhurina, Dr. V.R. Gowrishankar, which brought special sparkle to the occasion. In the same year, appreciating the Sangha's activities, a resident of Jayanagar, Sri Subhash Chandra presented to the Sangha a silver Ganesha, 2 feet tall weighing 6.5 kg.

== Notable performers ==
The following cine-stars have participated in Ganesha Utsava over the years:

Famous stars of Kannada movie of yesteryears as well as today, Hanumanthachar, KLN Swamy(Ravi), Shivaram, Dwarakish, BV Radha, Gangadhar, Nagarathnamma, Master Hirannaiah, Manjula, Shreenath, Vishnuvardhan, Bharati Vishnuvardhan, Ambarish, Ashok, Ramesh Aravind, Shivarajkumar, Shreenagara Kitti, Yash, Comedian Chikkanna, Radhika Pandit, and Tamil stars Rajanikanth, Kamalahasan and famous star Shobhana.

Hindi film stars Hemamalini, Isha Sharvani, Amruta Arora, Karina Kapoor, Govinda, Sushant Singh Rajput, Ankita Lokhande, Rishi Kapoor, Chunky Pandey, Anil Kapoor – all of them have participated in various Ganesha Utsavas.

=== 12 Hours of Non-Stop Musical Concerts ===
Every year, the sangha presents innovative cultural programs, which gain acceptance with people. In its 56th year, the Sangha presented '12 hours of non-stop musical concert'. In the first year, Sri Purandara Aradhana Mahotsava was presented. A 'Hindustani Classical and Devotional' music program, by doyens of music was presented during 57th year. A program of semi-classical music, titled 'Haadu Haleyadadarenu Bhava Navanaveena' under Pravin D Rao's leadership was slated in the 58th year. Also presented the same year was a program featuring various music forms of India, by renowned playback singer Sangita Katti Kulkarni, titled 'Parampara – evolution of music in India'. In the 59th year, a musical homage to Lata Mangeshkar and Asha Bhosle included more than 70 musicians. The program was led by Flutist, Ashwini Kaushik, Manjunath N S of Manju Drum Collectives, Dr Suchetan Rangaswamy and Guitar Srinivas and collaborated by Praveen D Rao.

== Environmental sustainability ==
Since the 48th year, the Utsava has been celebrated as 'Plastic-free'. Usage of plastic is not allowed anywhere inside the pandal. Shops participating in 'Ahara Utsava' cannot use plastic plate, tumbler, spoon or any other plastic cutlery. As a model of ecofriendly behavior, the Sangha has done away with the use of POP Ganesha.

Since their 54th year, the Sangha has reused the eight-foot-tall main idol and has adopted clay idols of Ganesha for worship. In addition, the Sangha has planned several programs to create awareness amongst people, the workshop for making ecofriendly clay idols of Ganesha during the 57th year being the prime event.

In the 57th year, the Sangha distributed ecofriendly clay idols of Ganesha to hundreds of devotees, free of cost. The program was arranged on 27 and 30 August 2019 at the National College grounds.

== Stage ==
Every year, the mantapa (stage) for the festival is made to resemble architectural marvels in Karnataka. In 2014, 2015 and 2016, replicas of the Cheluva-Narayana Swamy Temple located in Melukote (along with the pond named Kalyani), the Kollur Mookambika Temple and the Dharmasthala Manjunatha Temple had been recreated at the grounds. The year 2017 hosted the 55th festival which showcased a replica of the Durbar Hall of the Mysore Palace.

These mantapas over the years, measuring more than 5000 sq ft each in area, have been put up in the APS College grounds and the National College grounds. These mandapas recreate various scenic spots of Karnataka like Belur and Halebeedu, etc. People come from all corners of the city, stand in queue for hours, to view the mandapa and obtain blessings from Lord Ganesha.
