= Gokak (disambiguation) =

Gokak is a taluka headquarters in Belgaum District, Karnataka, India.

Gokak may also refer to:

- Gokak (rural), a village in Belgaum district, Karnataka, India
- V. K. Gokak (1909–1992), Kannada writer and scholar

== See also ==
- Gokak agitation, a 1980s Kannada language-right movement in Karnataka
- Gokak Falls, a waterfall in Belgaum district
- Gokak Falls, Belgaum, a town in Belgaum district
