= Yadugiri Yathiraja Mutt =

Tenkalai Sri Vaishnava at Melkote, Karnataka

- ಯದುಗಿರಿ ಯತಿರಾಜ ಮಠ
- Interactive map of Yadugiri Yathiraja Mutt

Monastery information
- Order: Sri Vaishnava
- Denomination: Tenkalai
- Established: 12th Century

People
- Founder: Ramanujacharya

Site
- Location: Melkote, Karnataka
- Country: India
- Coordinates: 12.661036°N 76.648546°E
- Public access: Yes
- Website: https://www.yathirajamutt.com/

Yadugiri Yathiraja Mutt at Melkote is a Tenkalai Sri Vaishnava Mutt founded by Ramanujacharya for the management of Cheluvanarayana Swamy Temple and the propagation of Ramanuja Vishishtadvaita darshana. Yathiraja is also another name for Ramanuja.

== Establishment ==
After Ramanujacharya was made the rajguru of Hoysala Empire, Lord Vishnu in a dream ordered Ramanuja to move to Melkote, where he would find the holy earth. Traditional accounts mention that the reason for travel was to search for namam clay for Srivaishnava Urdhva Pundra which was abundant in Melkote. Upon traveling, he found the holy earth and a vigraha of the god under an ant hill which was subsequently installed as the deity Tirunarayana of Melkote in the Bahudhanya year, Pushyamasa, Shukla Paksha, Chaturdashi according to Pancharatra agama. Ramanuja worshipped it for three days, followed by kumbhabhishekham and recited tamil vedas. Subsequently, the Yadugiri Yathiraja Mutt was established for a sanyasi to live and manage the affairs of the temple. The Jeeyars of the mutt attracted devotees and received royal patronage by their scholarship, devotion, and other qualities. The mutt is entitled for a share in the properties, assets, funds, and services in the Cheluvanarayana Swamy Temple. By 1256, Bhashyakara Sannidhi, a shrine for Ramanuja had been built and a Ramanuja Kutam, a choultry for feeding was provided a grant.

== Guruparamparai ==
Ramanuja created a temple manual Niyamanappadi for the systematic application of temple activities and left the administration to his fifty-two pratama sishyas with Tiruvali Annan of Sadamarshana gotra, Apastamba Dharmasutra, Yajurveda shakha carrying out the orders of Jeeyar. In 1104, Ramanuja appointed Sri Deshantari Kelvi Tiru-Narayana Jeeyar as his successor at the mutt to propagate growth and was handed Cheluvanarayana Swamy Temple mudra. With Ramanuja's motivating grace and as enshrined in the rule book Niyamanappadi, the Jeeyars continued the nitya bhagavat aradhana in & around the temple. The duties of the successor Jeeyars were to sign the papers relating to the temple treasury, look after the temple property, employ people for receiving all the income from the offerings, put his seal in addition to the royal seal and Ramanuja-mudre and receive the same honors that the 52 pratama sishyas were entitled to. The current Jeeyar is Sri Yadugiri Yatiraja Narayana Ramanuja Jeeyar Swami.

== Later years ==
To this day, the mutt has had a long line of illustrious successors and the building is still intact. In the eighteenth century, due to the Vadakalai and Tenkalai sectarian disputes in Tamilnadu and the litigation that followed, all the wealth of the mutt was diverted towards the dispute. The Yadugiri Yathiraja Matha at Melkote became a Tenkalai matha, with subsects of Purvasikha, the Kilnattars, and the Mandyans representing the matha. A dispute known as the Tirtha case arose between the Parakala Matha at Mysore and the Yadugiri Yathiraja Matha at Melkote on matters like the Mandayam entry and so on. The authorized representatives of Yadugiri Yathiraja Mutt observed that the Mandyam entry to the Yadugiri Yathiraja Mutt Gadi was from the year 1850 and that prior to that the line belonged to the Kilnattars and the present stone image of the sannyasin in the Yadugiri Yatiraja Math was the image of a purvasikhi, representative of the fifty-two followers of Ramanuja.

== See also ==
- Sri Vaishnavism
- Ramanuja
- Cheluvanarayana Swamy Temple
- Melkote
