= Cheluvanarayana Swamy Temple =

Coordinates: 12°39′36.8″N 76°38′51.1″E

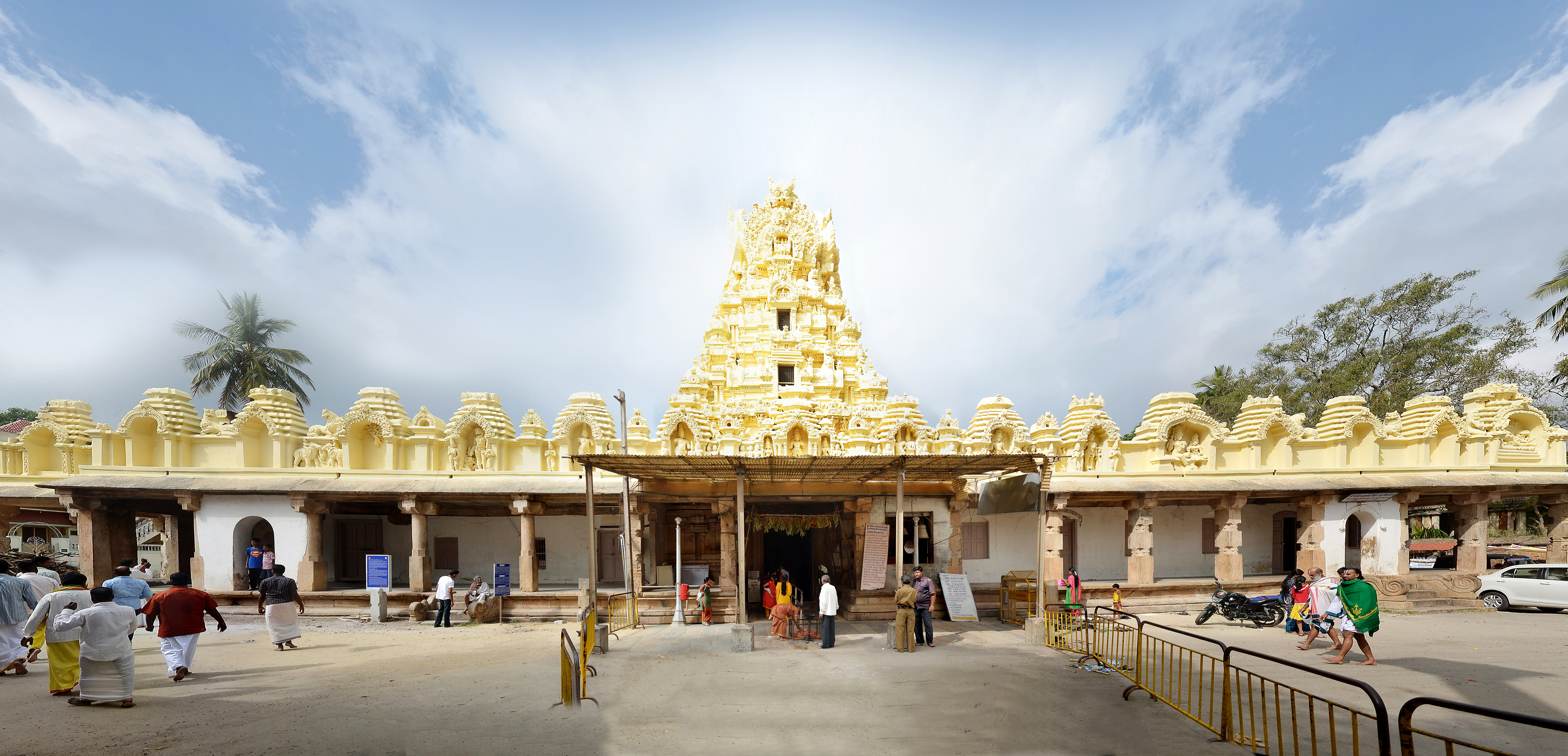
- A view from front side of Cheluvanarayana Swamy Temple

Religion
- Affiliation: Hinduism
- District: Mandya District
- Deity: Cheluvanarayana Swamy

Location
- Location: Melkote
- State: Karnataka
- Country: India
- Interactive map of Cheluvanarayana Swamy Temple

Cheluvanarayana Swamy Temple, also known as Selva Pillai or Thirunarayanapuram, is a temple in Melukote in the Mandya District of Karnataka, India. The temple lies on the foothills of Melkote and is associated with the Yoga Narasimha temple built on rocky hills which overlook the Kaveri valley. The temple is classified one among the 108 Abhimana Kshethram of Vaishnavate the tradition. It is about 30 miles (48 km) from Mysore and 97 miles (156 km) from Bangalore.

The temple legend associates the place as the worship place of Vishnu by Brahma. The temple in its current form was constructed during the 11th century. The temple is associated with Ramanuja and has received several endowments from the ruling Mysore kings. In modern times, the temple is maintained and administered by the Hindu Religious Charitable Endowment Department, Government of Karnataka.

== Legend ==
Legend has it that once Hindu god Brahma requested Vishnu to gift him his image to worship. Vishnu handed him an idol which Brahma gave his son Sanatakumara who in turn installed it in current Melkote. Brahma requested one more image for worship with Vishnu and he gave a metal image, which was believed to have been carried by Rama during the Kritayuga, Balarama during the Dwaparayuga and Yadava family during kaliyuga. The presiding deity is called Narayanadri and the metal image is referred as Yadavadri.

According to another legend, Ramanujacharya went to Delhi to retrieve the utsava-murti that had been stolen from the temple. The Delhi Sultan shows Ramanujacharya his treasury of looted statues, however the idol Ramapriya is not among them. The next day Ramanuja finds the idol being played with as a doll by the Sultan's princess. He calls out to the idol "Cheluva pille!" (Beloved son) and the idol comes to him. Ramanuja takes the idol back to Melkote, however the princess follows him, unwilling to part with the idol. The princess becomes one with the idol out of devotion and to this day is honoured as "Bibi Nachiyar".

The legend however is anachronistic as the Delhi sultanate was established in the 13th century while Ramanujacharya is believed to have lived in the 11th and 12th centuries. Similar "Tulukka Nachiyar" (Turkish sacred woman) stories are seen for Srirangam and Madurai temples to show how Bhakti transcends socio-religious boundaries.

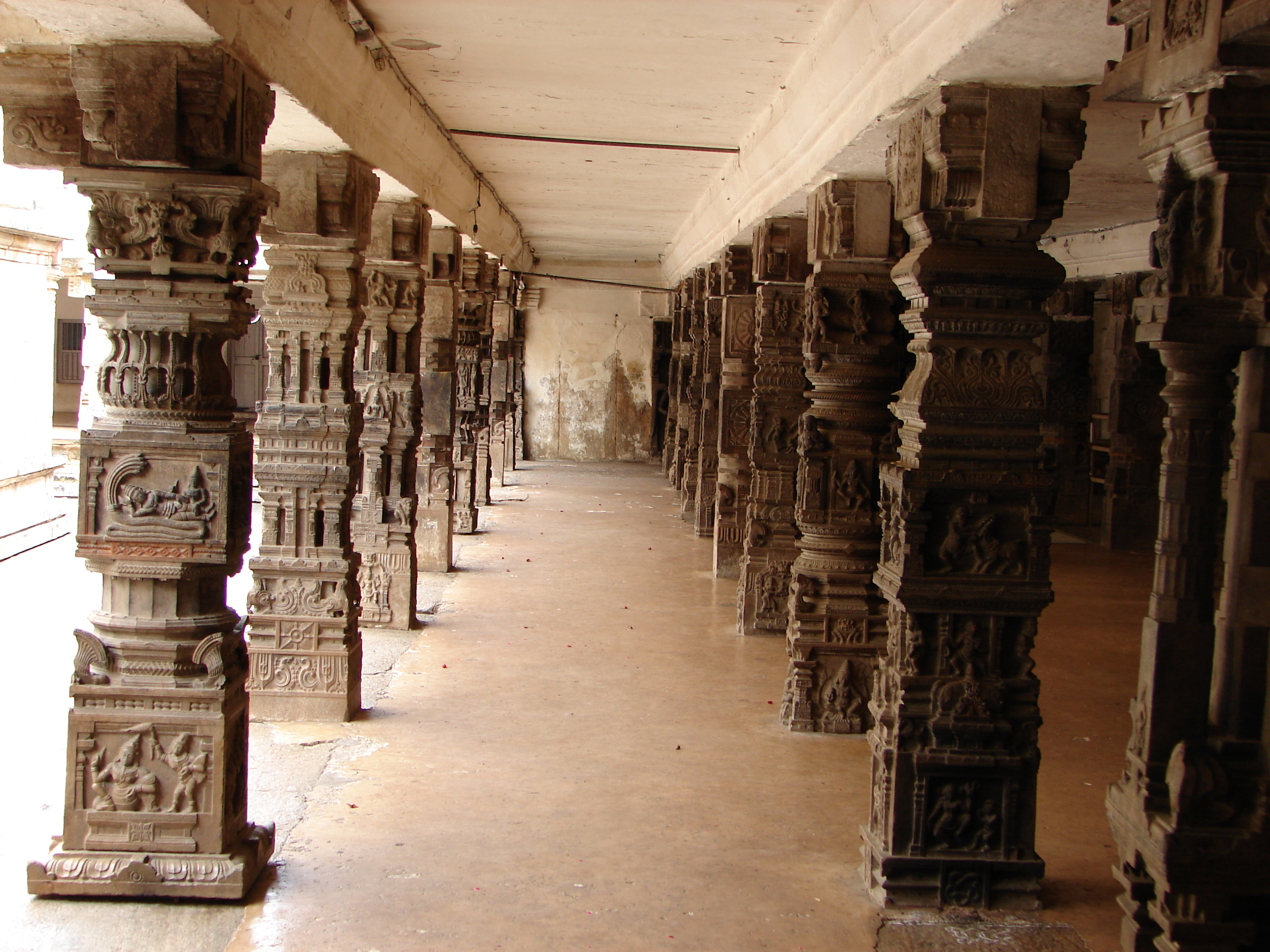
Mantapa at the temple

After Ramanujacharya was made the rajguru of Hoysala Empire, Vishnu in a dream ordered Ramanuja to move to Melkote, where he would find the holy earth. Traditional accounts mention that the reason for travel was to search for namam clay for Srivaishnava Urdhva Pundra which was abundant in Melkote. Upon traveling, he found the holy earth and a vigraha of Vishnu which was installed as the deity Tirunarayana of Melkote in the Bahudhanya year (1099 CE) Pushyamasa Shukla Paksha Chaturdashi, the deity was installed according to Pancharatra agama. Ramanuja worshipped it for three days, followed by kumbhabhishekham and recited tamil vedas. Vishnuvardhana sanctioned 5000 Gadyanas for the construction of the temple which was completed in 1104 CE. Subsequently, the Yadugiri Yathiraja Mutt was established for a sanyasi to live and manage the affairs of the temple.

== Temple complex ==
The temple complex has a square plan and houses the image of Cheluvanarayanaswami in the sanctum. The temple halls house the images of Ramanuja, Azhwars and Yadugiriamma The temple is lined with carved pillars and features a dome-like top decorated with highly detailed sculptures. The presiding deity is Cheluvanarayana Swamy, also known as Tirunarayana (ತಿರುನಾರಾಯಣ) or Cheluvapille Raya (ಚೆಲುವಪಿಲ್ಲೆ ರಾಯ), a form of Vishnu. Inscriptions indicate that the deity was also known as Ramapriya.

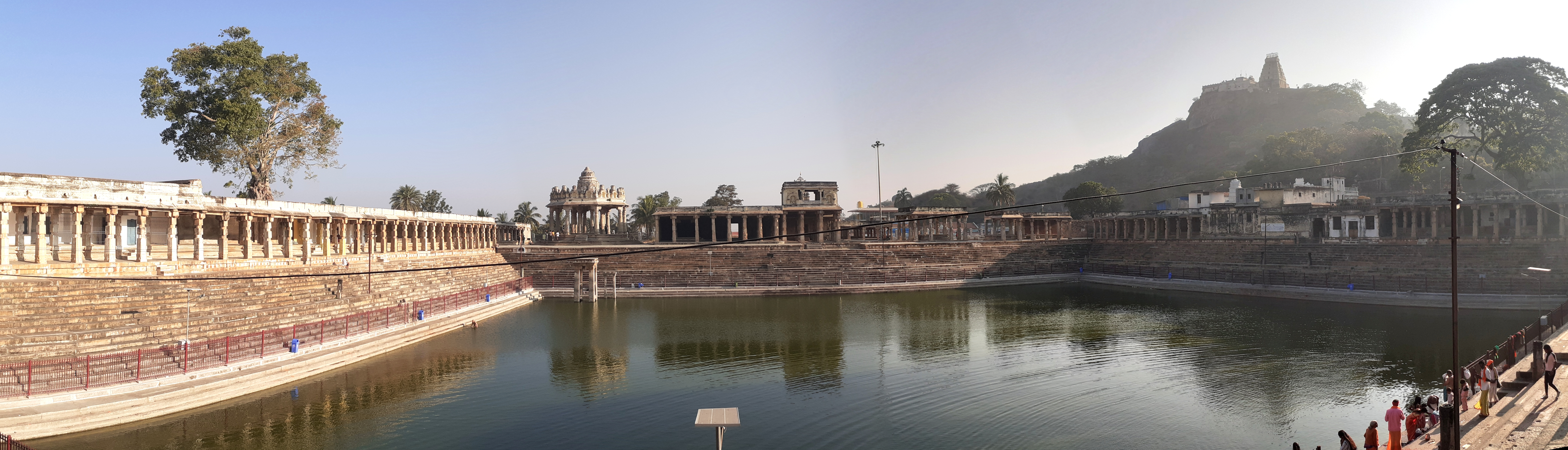
Panoramic view of the Yoga Narsimha temple and the temple tank, Kalyani

The utsavamurthi (ಉತ್ಸವ ಮೂರ್ತಿ), a metal idol sculpture used for processions and certain religious rituals, represents the deity Cheluvanarayana Swamy. According to the legend, this metallic figure was once lost, but was recovered by Sri Ramanujacharya.

== Endowments ==
The temples has rich endowments received from various ruling Mysore kings. The Rajamudi, the crown studded with stones was presented by Mysore king Wodeyar (1578 - 1617CE). Tipu Sultan is believed to have donated elephants and Nagari to the temple. The Mysore king Krishnaraja Wodeyar (1799 - 1831 CE) has donated a crown set with precious jewels known as Krishnarajamudi. There is a third crown set studded with diamond known as Vairamudi. All these are used to decorate the processional deity during temple festivals. All three crowns are kept in the custody of the government and are brought to the temple on a specific annual occasion to adorn the image of Cheluvanarayana Swamy.
