= Melukote =

Village and temple in Karnataka, India

Melukote Yadavagiri
- Village
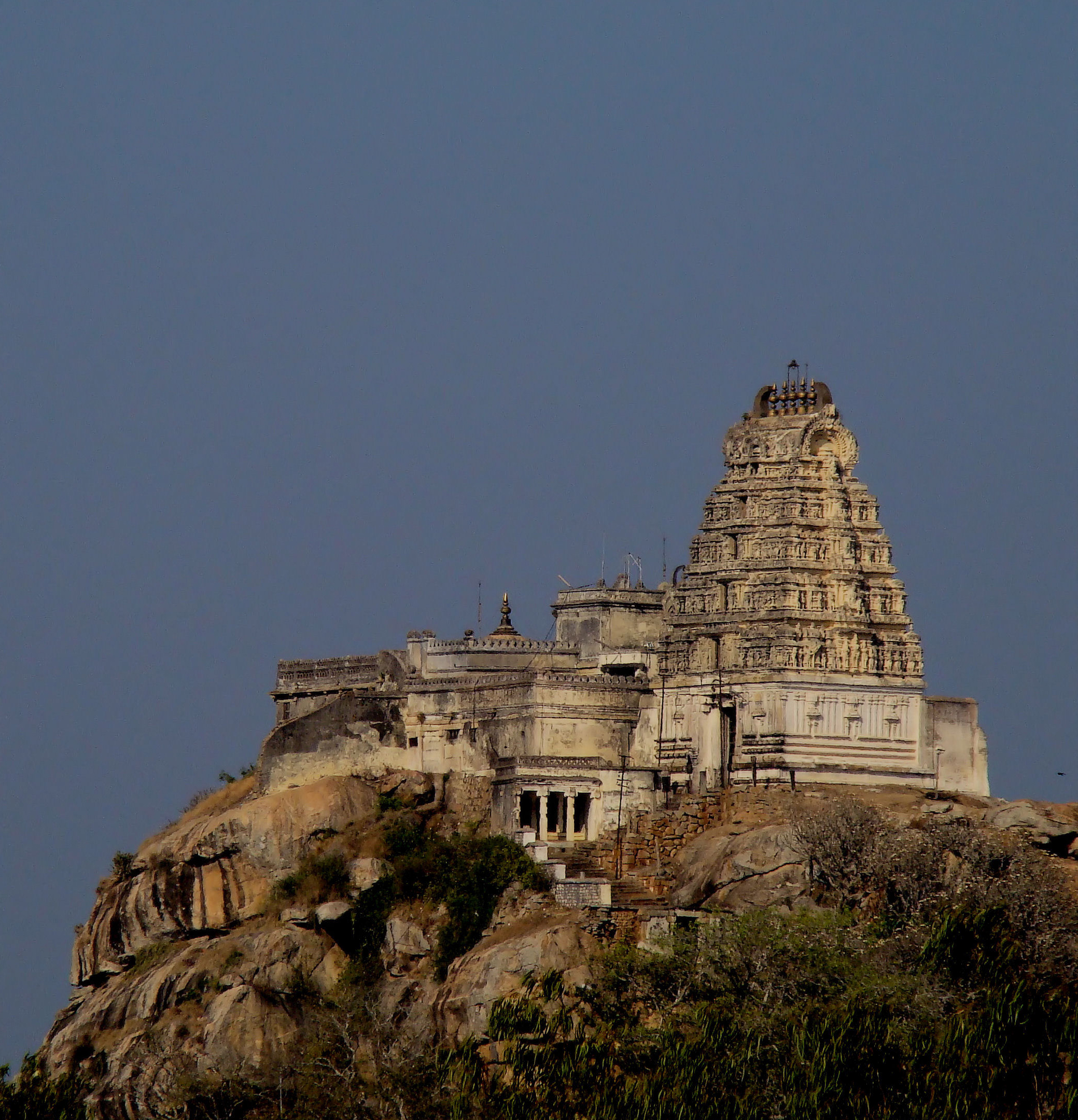
- Yoga-Narasimha Temple

- Location in Karnataka, India
- Coordinates: 12°39′34″N 76°38′54″E
- Country: India
- State: Karnataka
- District: Mandya
- Taluka: Pandavapura

Government
  - Body: Grama Panchayath

Area
  - Total: 4.895 km^{2} (1.890 sq mi)
- Elevation: 1,030 m (3,380 ft)

Population (2011)
  - Total: 3,315
  - Density: 677.2/km^{2} (1,754/sq mi)

Languages
  - Official: Kannada
- Time zone: UTC+5:30 (IST)
- PIN: 571431
- Telephone code: 08232
- Vehicle registration: KA-11

Melukote in Pandavapura taluk of Mandya district, Karnataka, in southern India, is one of the sacred places in Karnataka. It is built on rocky hills, known as Yadugiri, Yaadavagiri or Yadushaila, overlooking the Cauvery valley. Melukote is about 51 km (32 miles) from Mysore and 133 km (83 mi) from Bangalore.

Melukote is the location of the Cheluvanarayana Swamy Temple, with a collection of crowns and jewels which are brought to the temple for the annual celebration. On the top of the hill is the temple of Yoganarasimha. Many more shrines and ponds are located in the town. Melukote is home to the academy of Sanskrit Research, which has collected thousands of Vedic and Sanskrit manuscripts.

Early in the 12th century, the famous Sri Vaishnava saint Sri Ramanujacharya, who hailed from present day Tamil Nadu, stayed at Melukote for about 12 years. It has thus become a prominent centre of the Sri Vaishnava sect.

Melukote has very dark history of Tipu Sultan's soldiers attacked a temple while deepavali puja was going. 1500 Mandyam Iyengars were massacred. After the attack and massacre, people of Melukote stopped celebrating deepavali since 1790.

== Geography ==
Melukote is a village and a historic place of the same name, situated at a distance of 36 km (22 miles) north-west of Mandya, and 51 km (32 miles) north of Mysore.

According to mythological account, this place was known as Narayanadri, Vedadri, Yadavadri, Yathishaila and Tirunarayanapuram.

The name of the place is derived from the temple of Narayanaswamy which is built on the hillock, surrounded by a fort. It is built on a rocky hill-range named Yadugiri, which is 3,589 feet (1,094 m) high above sea level. The village is the only settlement in Mandya district, located above 1000 metres.

== History ==
In the 12th century, the Sri Vaishnava saint Ramanujacharya took up his residence in this location for about 14 years. As a result, it became a prominent centre of Sri Vaishnavism. Large numbers of Iyengar Brahmins migrated and settled in the region, forming the Mandyam Iyengar community. Around 1795, Tipu sultan's army massacared around 230 hindus in the sacred temple on the morning of narka chaturdashi i.e. diwali morning, till this date it has remained a day of mourning for the town.

== Temple ==
=== Cheluva-Narayana Swamy Temple ===
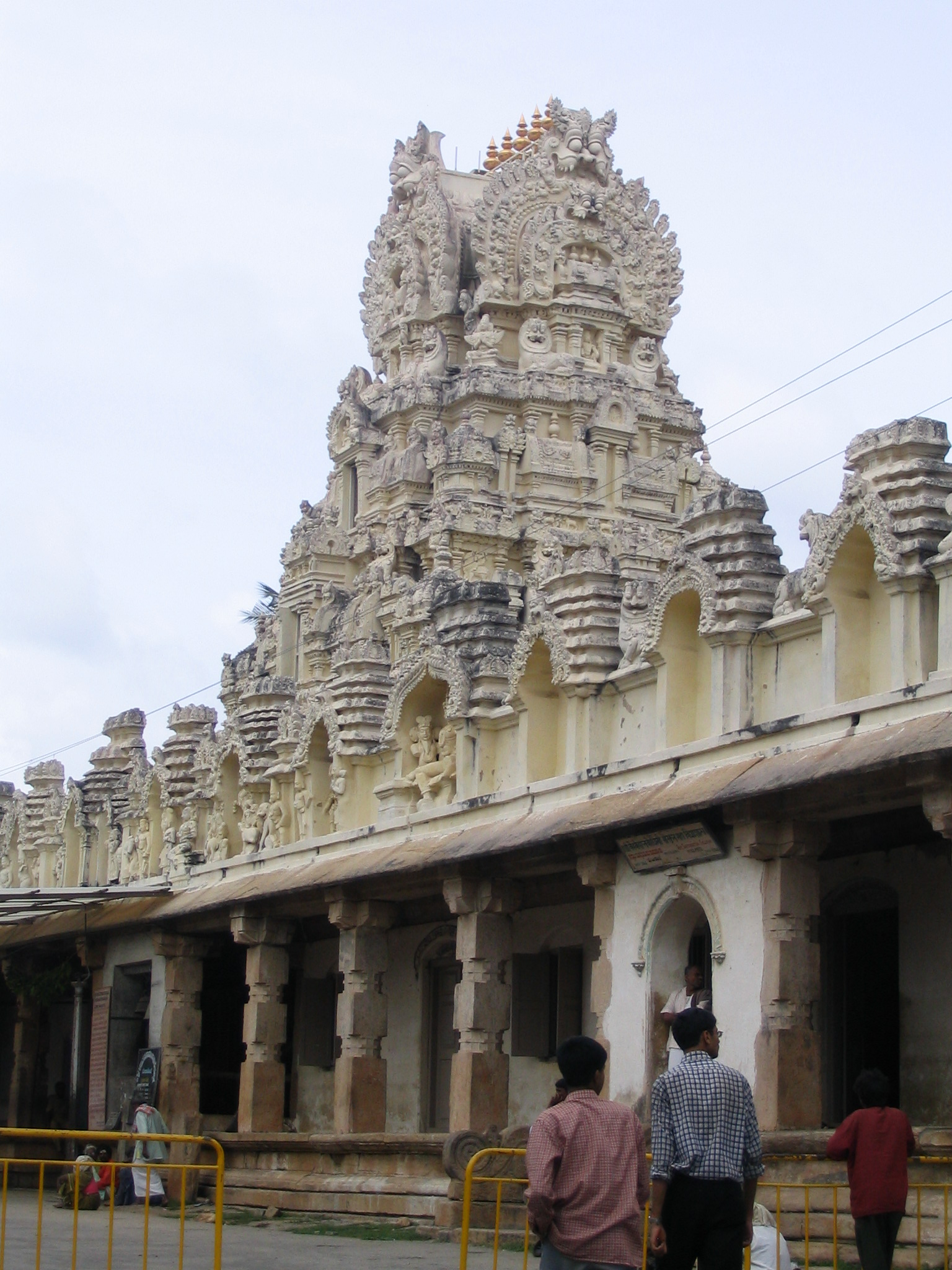
Cheluva-Narayana Swamy Temple

The principal temple is a square building of large dimensions but very plain, dedicated to Lord Cheluva-Narayana Swamy or Thirunarayanar. The utsavamurthi, which is a metallic image, represents the deity who is called Selva Pillai, Sampath Kumaran, Cheluva Raya and Cheluvanarayana Swamy, whose original name appears to have been Ramapriya (meaning "Rama's Favourite"). It is believed that this utsavamurthi belonged to and was worshipped by Lord Rama and the kings of the surya vamsa Dynasty for generations. Later the same deity was given to a king of Chandra vamsam (the dynasty of Lord Krishna) and was worshipped by Lord Krishna and many generations. So CheluvaNarayana is so unique that he was worshipped by both Rama and Krishna.

According to a legend, this metallic image was lost for many centuries and was recovered by Sri Ramanujacharya. The annual report of the Mysore Archeaelogical Department (p. 57) states, on the strength of epigraphic evidence, that the presiding deity of this temple was already a well-known object of worship before Sri Ramanujacharya worshipped at the shrine, in December 1098, and even before he came to the Mysore region.

The temple is richly endowed, having been under the special patronage of the Vijaya nagar king Vikitapathi Raya and Mysore kings, and it has an extremely valuable collection of jewels in its custody. As early as 1614, Maharaja Raja Wodeyar I (1578–1617) of Mysore, who first acquired Srirangapatna and adopted the Sri Vaishnava faith, granted to the temple, and to the Brahmins at Melkote as custodians of the deity, the large and valuable estate (fiefdom) granted to him by Vijaynagar emperor Venkatapati Raya. On one of the pillars of the temple's nava-aranga ("new stage" or pavilion for music and dance performances), there stands a bas relief about 1.5 feet (0.46 m) high, of Raja Wodeyar, standing with folded hands, with his name inscribed on the base. He is said to have been a great devotee of the presiding deity and a regular visitor to the temple. A gold crown set with precious jewels was presented by him to the temple. This crown is known as the Raja-mudi, after his name. From the inscriptions on some of the gold jewels and on gold and silver vessels in the temple, it is learnt that they were presents from Krishnaraja Wadiyar III (r. 1799–1831) and his queens. Krishnaraja Wodeyar III also presented a crown set with precious jewels. It is known after him as Krishnaraja-mudi. Yet another crown, known as the Vairamudi or Vajramukuta, which is set with diamonds and must have been the most expensive of the three, is also older than both the Raja-mudi and Krishnaraja-mudi. Who was the donor of that very valuable crown, and how it came into the possession of the temple, is unknown. However, as the oldest crown, it has a special place in ritual ceremonies, and has a special annual commemoration named after it, namely the vairamudi habba. Despite all the royal connections of the other two crowns, it is only the old vairamudi to be distinguished this way.

All the three crowns are kept in the safe custody of the state government at the Mandya Treasury. They are brought to the temple to adorn the image of Cheluvanarayana Swamy only during a specific annual festival known as Vairamudi habba (literally "Diamond crown festival"). This festival commemorates, and is named after, the oldest crown, of unknown origin. The Vairamudi festival, which is the chief annual celebration, is attended by more than 400,000 people. Jatra (chariot festival, when the utsava murthy of the deity is taken in procession through the streets of the town) is held annually during March–April and more than one lakh people congregate for this occasion.

A number of inscriptions and records of the place speak of other land grants and gifts to this shrine. Perhaps the fort on the hill was built during Hoysala and Vijayanagara period. The renovated temple has a beautiful gopura was built by Vijayanagar Dynasty.

This temple is under the direct control of Yadugiri Yathiraja Mutt.

=== Yoga-Narasimha Swamy Temple ===
On the top of the hill is an attractive Melkote Narasimha temple dedicated to Lord Yoga Narasimha. It is believed that the image of Yoga Narasimha temple at Melkote was installed by Prahlada himself. Krishnaraja Wodeyar III presented a gold crown to Lord Yoga Narasimha.

It is also believed that this is the place where Prahlad did his penance. Since his father, the demon Hiranyakashipu was killed by Narasimha, Prahlad was advised by his elders to do penance, so that “Pitra-dosha” does not affect him. So this is the place where Prahlad worshipped Nrsimha in the form of Shaligram.

The temple follows Tenkalai traditions from the time of Ramanujacharya. Vadakalai namam was introduced in the temple when the head of Parakala Matha became the rajguru for maharajas of Mysore, but, was met with stiff resistance. A new temple tower built in 1970s had Vadakalai markings. In the court ruling in case regarding the Vadakalai namam, court observed the namam were newly introduced, but, removing them would hurt the sentiments of Vadakalai and did not order remove these symbols. Court also observed that stolen Vadakalai ornaments were unauthorizedly put and going forward, in case of conflict between Tenkalai and Vadakalai, a single red line namam be used.

=== Kalyani or Pushkarani ===
The temple infrastructure has a large pond called as Kalyani. The beauty of the steps leading to water and the mantapas built all around are such that it has been captured in many Indian films. One of the songs of Hindi Block-buster film Damini featuring Rishi Kapoor and Minakshi Sheshadri has been shot at here in Melukote Temple.

== Other important places ==
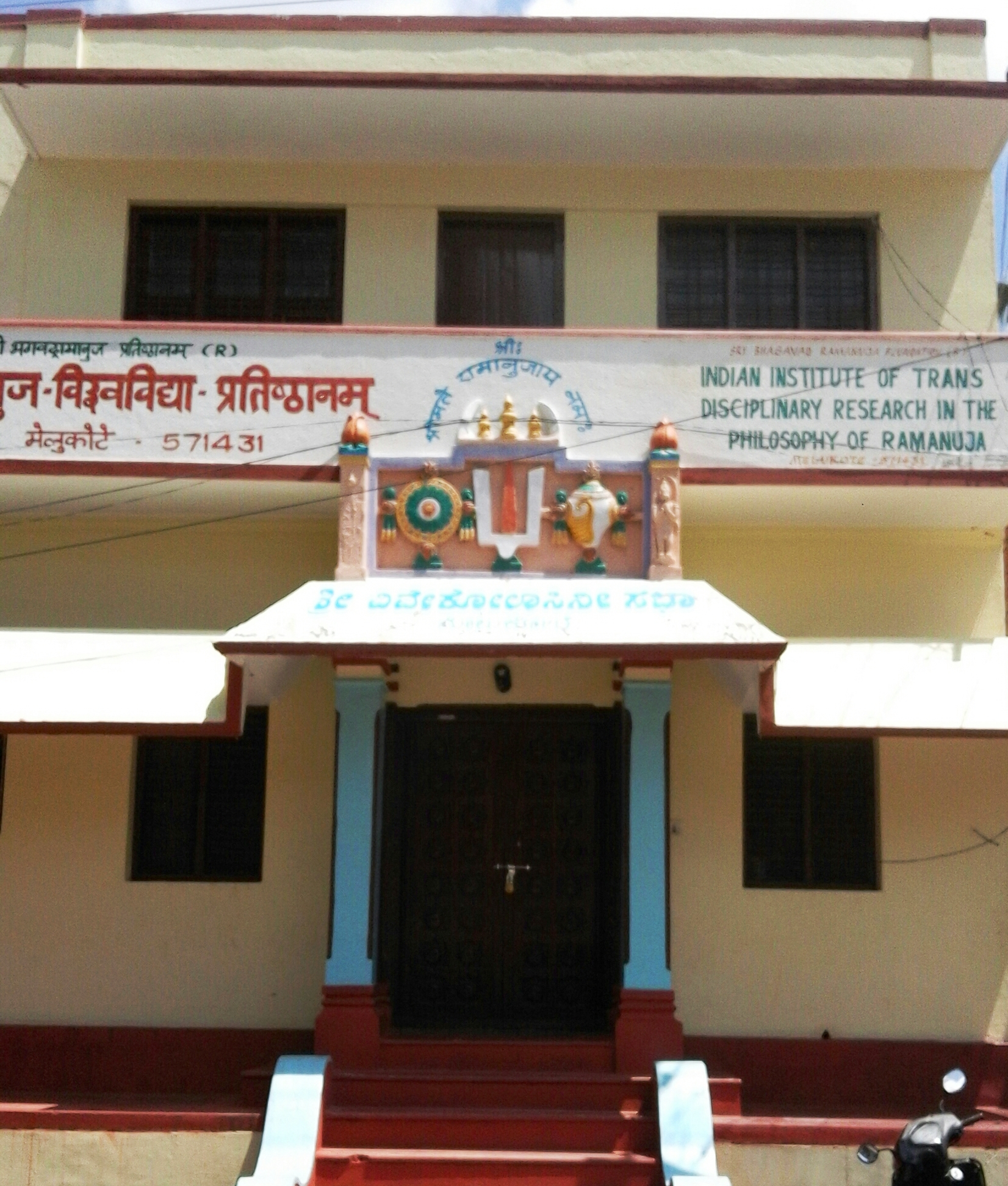
Ramanuja Institute

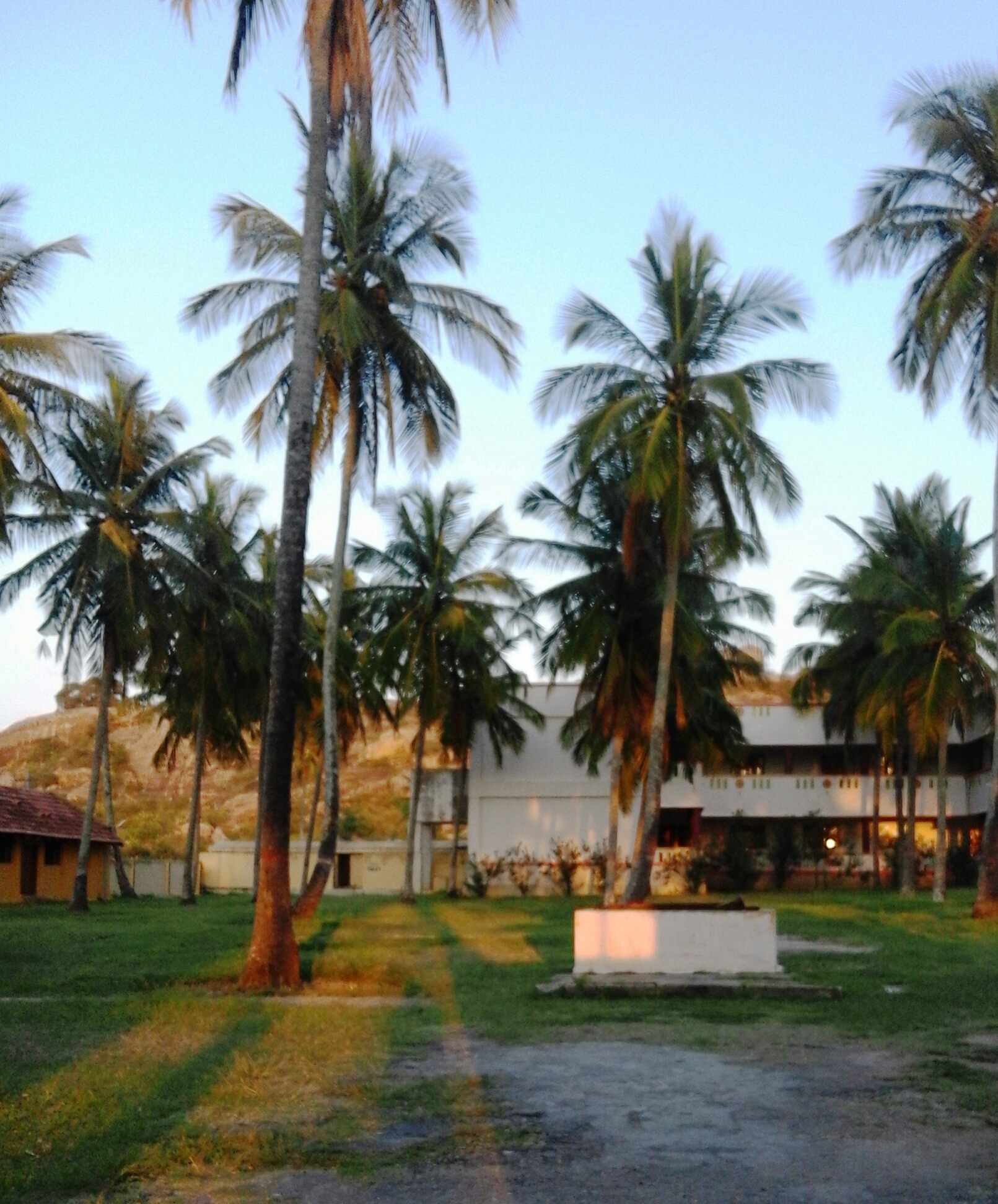
Industrial Training Institute

There are other shrines of Ramanuja, images of Alvars and Yadugiriammanavaru etc., in the temple.

On top of the hill is the impressive temple of Yoganarasimha. Krishnaraja Wodeyar III presented a gold crown to this upper shrine. There is a big pond there. Many more shrines and ponds are located in the town.

Melukote has been a centre of learning. It has contributed many literary figures, such as Tirumalarya, Chikkupadhyaya, Alasingachar and Pu. Ti. Narasimhachar.

Sri Vedavedantha Bodhini Sanskrit College is one of the oldest institutions here, established in 1854. An old library founded in 1935, contains large number of Sanskrit, Kannada, Tamil and Telugu books and manuscripts. In 1976, opening in 1978, a research institute, the Samskrita Academy was established, which incorporated the library.

Yadugiri Yathiraja Mutt, Ahobila Matha and Parakala Matha of the Sri Vaishnava sect are located in the place.

Melukote has been known for quality handlooms especially weaving dhoties, sarees, etc. An artisans training centre, a dairy unit and a residential school are established in the place.

=== Melkote Temple Wildlife Sanctuary ===
Melkote is also the location of the Melkote Temple Wildlife Sanctuary. This sanctuary was created on 17 June 1974, primarily to house wolves. Other mammals found in this sanctuary include the jungle cat, leopard, bonnet macaque, langur and pangolin. It is also an ornithologist's paradise, with around 200 species of birds indigenous to the area. Melkote Temple Wildlife Sanctuary has been known for its once abundant Cycas circinalis species, which in the recent time has been over exploited by the flower decorators and local doctors.

There is a vast forest land near this place and a wild life sanctuary was opened on 17 June 1974, to protect the species like wolves and black buck which are plenty in the area.

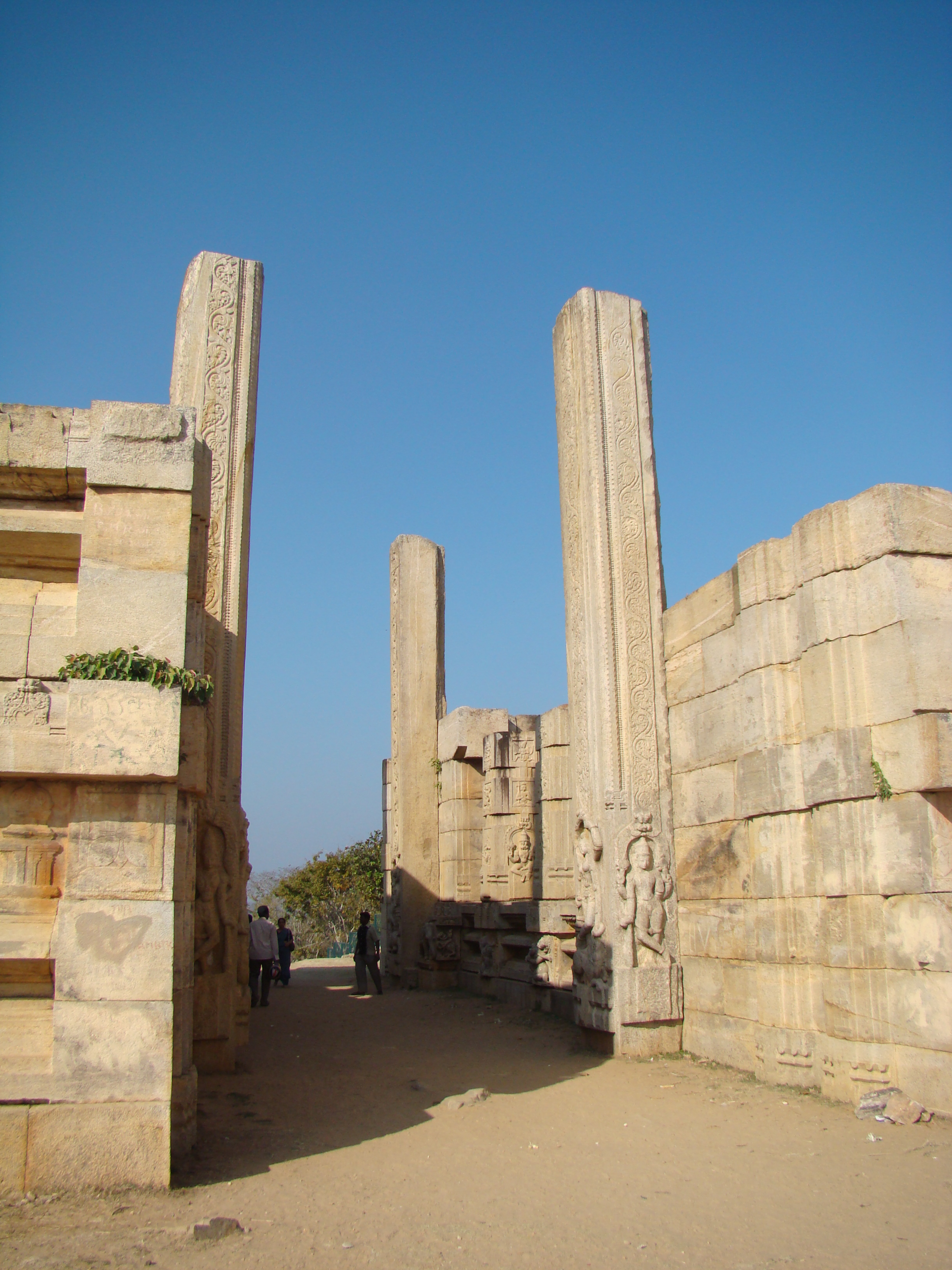
The rayagopura

From here visitors can also visit Thondanoor a nearby temple town, the location of the famous Nambi Narayana, Parthasarathi, Yoganarasimha and Ramanuja temples. This is approximately 20 km (12.4 miles) from Melukote.

== Festivals ==
=== Vairamudi Brahmotsava ===
Vairamudi Brahmotsava (Vairamudi Utsava) is an annual spiritual event and festival revered throughout South India. In the past it has attracted up to 400,000 devotees of Lord Cheluva Narayana (Tirunarayana). The main event is the procession of Lord Cheluvanarayana Swamy (as represented by an idol, normally in most Sri Vaishnava temples, the presiding deit "moolavar " is represented on procession by "utsavar "in a different name, here Cheluvaraya is called as "sampathkumara") through the streets of Melkote, which are decorated in his honour. In the procession the Lord's idol is carried on a golden garuda, along with idols representing his divine consorts Sridevi and Bhudevi. The procession takes place at night and continues until dawn. The festival is named for the legendary diamond studded crown, the Vaira Mudi, which the Lord only wears during this procession. For the rest of the festival the Lord wears the Rajamudi, another crown studded with precious stones.

According to Hindu legends, Vairamudi, the diamond crown, was stolen from Lord Narayana, when he was asleep at his abode in the Ksheera Sagara (Milky Ocean), by Virochana. Virochana was the king of demons and the son of Prahlada. Garuda was asked by the lord's devotees to bring back the crown. Garuda went after Virochana to the nether world, fought with the demon king and flew back with the crown.

According to the legend it is believed that Vairamudi lost its blue gem on the crest while Garuda was bringing it. The blue gem is believed to have fallen near Nachiar Koil, a temple town in Thanjavur district of Tamil Nadu. The gem turned into a stream, called the Manimuttaru, which to this day flows in Thanjavur. On his way, he saw Bala Krishna playing with his friends in the mid day sun at Brindavana. Garuda protected the Bala Krishna from the sun by placing his wings as the shade and placed the crown on his head. The local legends of Melkote claim that Krishna presented Cheluva Narayana with this crown.

Preparations for the Brahmotsava start several weeks before the festival. The actual celebrations take place over the course of thirteen days. Garudotsava is celebrated a day before the Brahmotsava at Melkote. The district administration of Mandya makes arrangements for bringing the Vairamudi crown from the Mandya treasury to the temple amidst great security measures. It is believed that the crown must not be exposed to daylight. When not in the procession the priests keep the crown hidden from view in a sacred casket.

On the evening of the procession, the crown is placed in front of the sanctum of Sri Acharya Ramanuja and the head priest places the Vaira Mudi and fits it to the statue of the Lord Cheluva Narayana. It is tradition that not even the head priest should look at the Vaira Mudi with naked eyes until it is fitted onto the Lord. Hence the priest covers his eyes with a silk cloth while fitting the crown.

During the 13-day celebration, Kalyanotsava, Nagavalli Mahotsava are held in the Holy Kalyani, followed by Maharatotsava. In most years the spiritual events have been accompanied by cultural programmes, including music and dance performances, but in 2014 they were cancelled because of the upcoming election and its "model code of conduct".

While Vairamudi Brahmotsava is one of the most important festivals for Sri Vaishnavas, others include the Garudotsava at Kancheepuram (Tamil Nadu), Kotharotsava at Srirangam (Tamil Nadu) and the Brahmotsava at Tirupati in Andhra Pradesh.

== Educational Institutes ==
=== Library and Sanskrit College ===
Melkote is house to the Academy of Sanskrit Research (ASR). Established in 1978, with further history that goes back a few centuries to the times of Ramanuja, ASR is spread over 14 acres at the southern end of Melkote, and contains schools that practice the gurukul system of Sanskrit education as well as those that teach in modern methods, libraries, halls and temples, all dedicated to the study of Sanskrit language and texts.

The private library of the Yatirajaswamigalu of Melkote contains a large number of Sanskrit and Kannada works bearing on the Vishishtadvaita school of philosophy, a few works bearing on logic, rhetoric, mathematics, astronomy, astrology, ritual, architecture, Pancharatra, Dharmashastras, Grihya and Dharmasutra. There is also a Sanskrit college here named Sri Veda Vedantha Bodhini Sanskrita Mahapatashala (Govt. Sanskrit College) which was established as early as in 1854 and which is one of the oldest institutions of its kind in the state. Melkote has contributed many literary figures like Pu Ti Narasimhachar, Tirumalaraya, Komanduri Deshika Charyulu ( got Appreciation Certificate also from Mysore Maharaja ), Chikkupadhyaya and Devashikhamani Alasingachar. The academy has also published a number of commentaries on Vedic texts, in English, Kannada and Sanskrit including Sayanacharya's commentaries on the Vedas and Purusha Suktam.

=== Yadugiri Education center ===
The Sri Yadugiri Education center (by Sri Ramanuja Srisha Seva Trust) provides cultural education to rural students. Sri Veda Vedanta Bodhini Govt. Sanskrit college is a place for traditional education. The mission of the institution is "Providing good education to rural students". Veda, Nalayira Divyaprabandha, Stotra and Grantha Kalakshepams are being taught in traditional families even today. SGS groups runs colleges and schools. SET group runs schools and polytechnics.

=== Academy of Sanskrit Research ===
The town is also home to the Academy of Sanskrit Research, an institution that was founded in 1977, by the Government of Karnataka. The academy has kept 83 employees with 25 research scholars working on Sanskrit Research. Some of the areas of research include: Vishishtadvaita, Upanishads and Scientific research from ancient texts. There is also a library that houses 11,000 manuscripts and 35,000 books.

== Image gallery ==
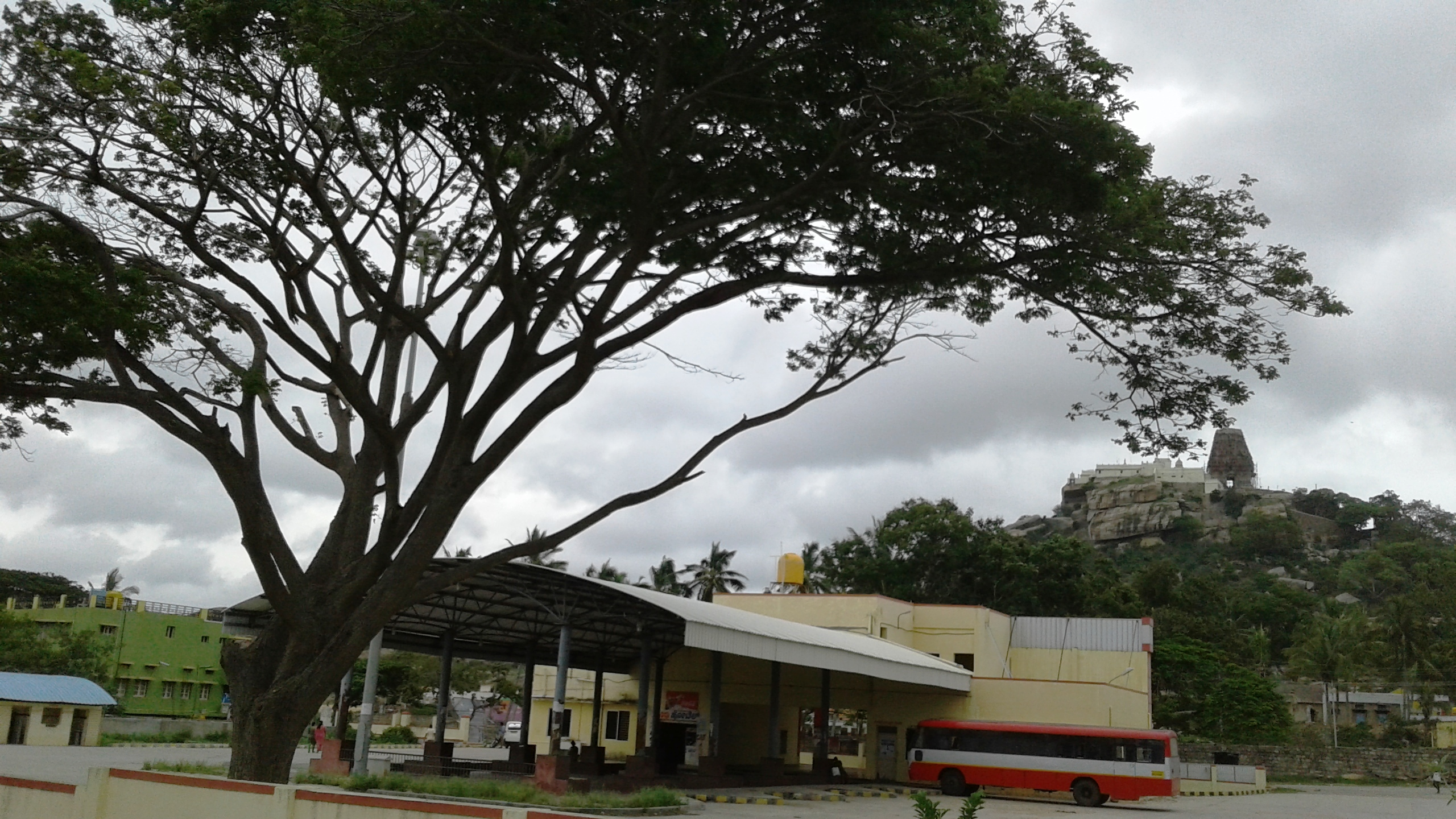
Bus Station

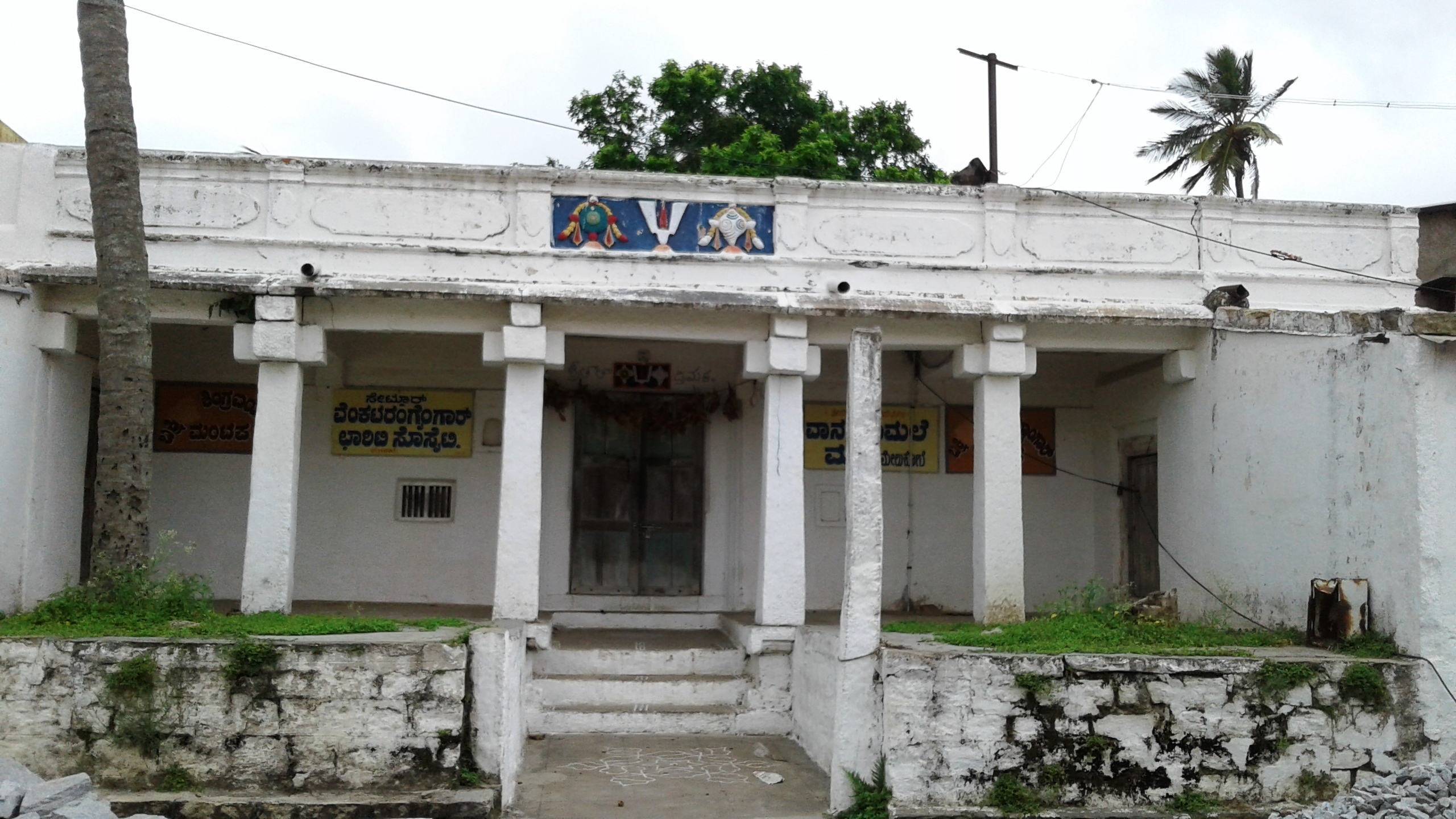
Period Building

Balughatta school

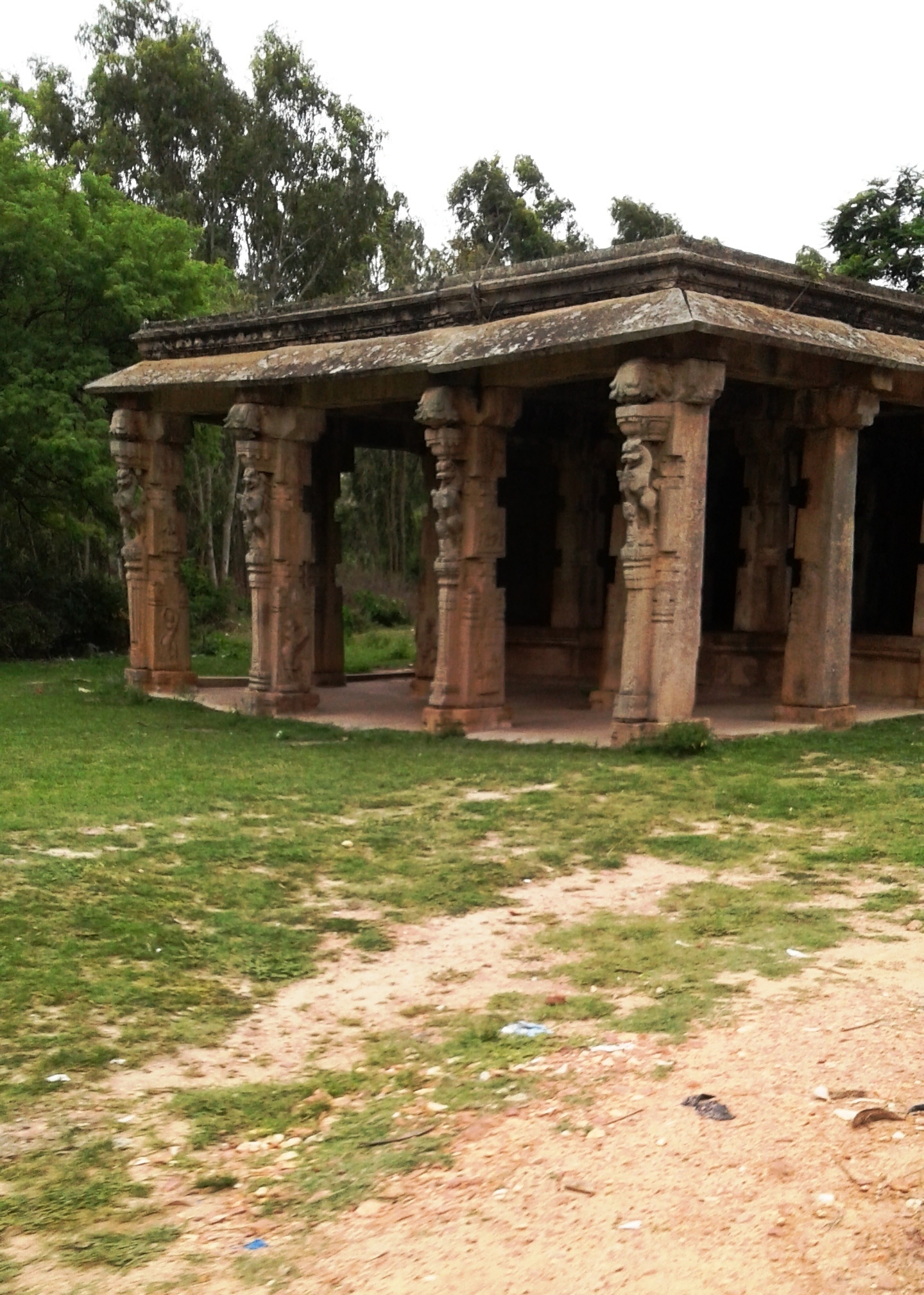
Checkpost

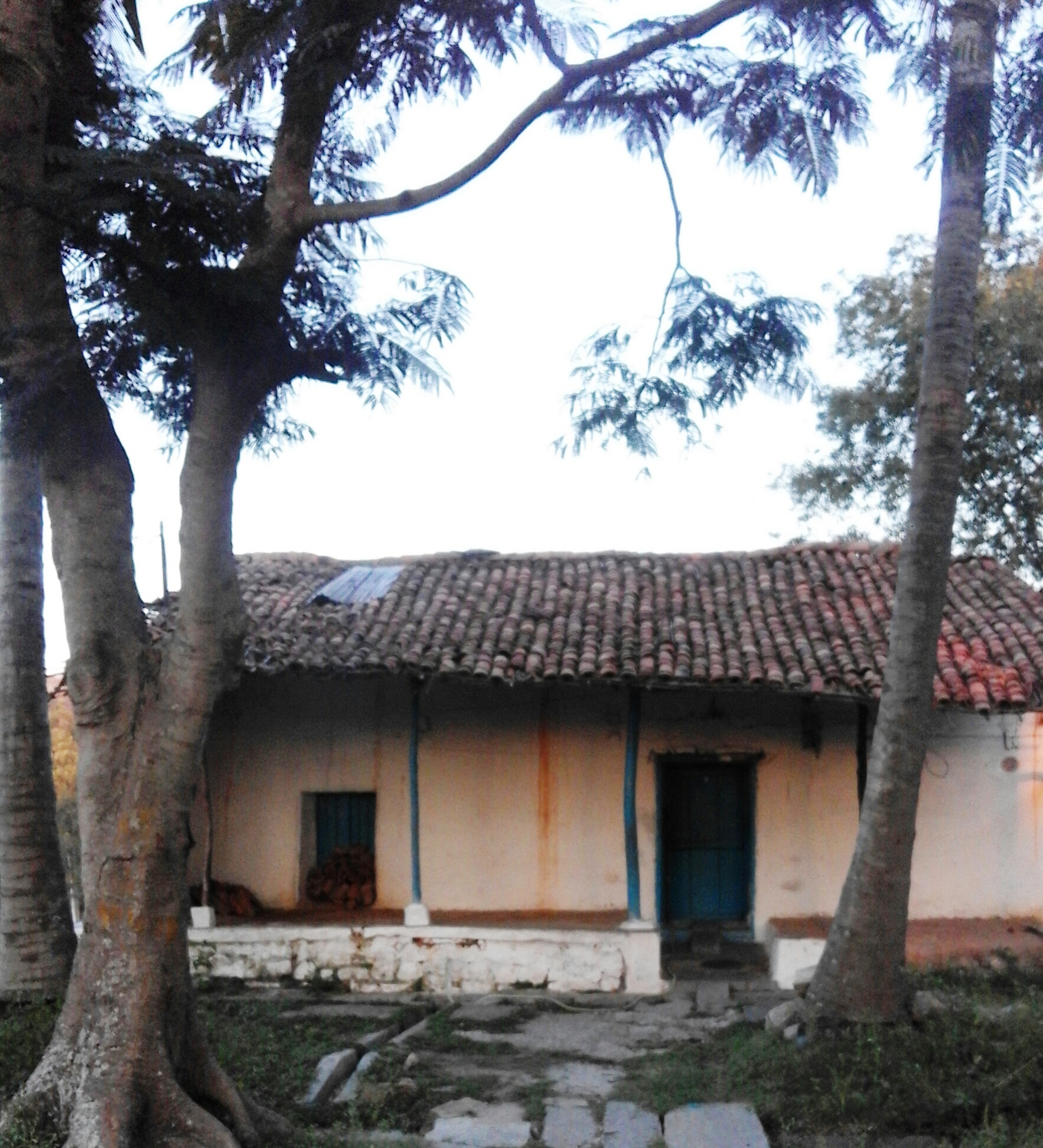
Village hut

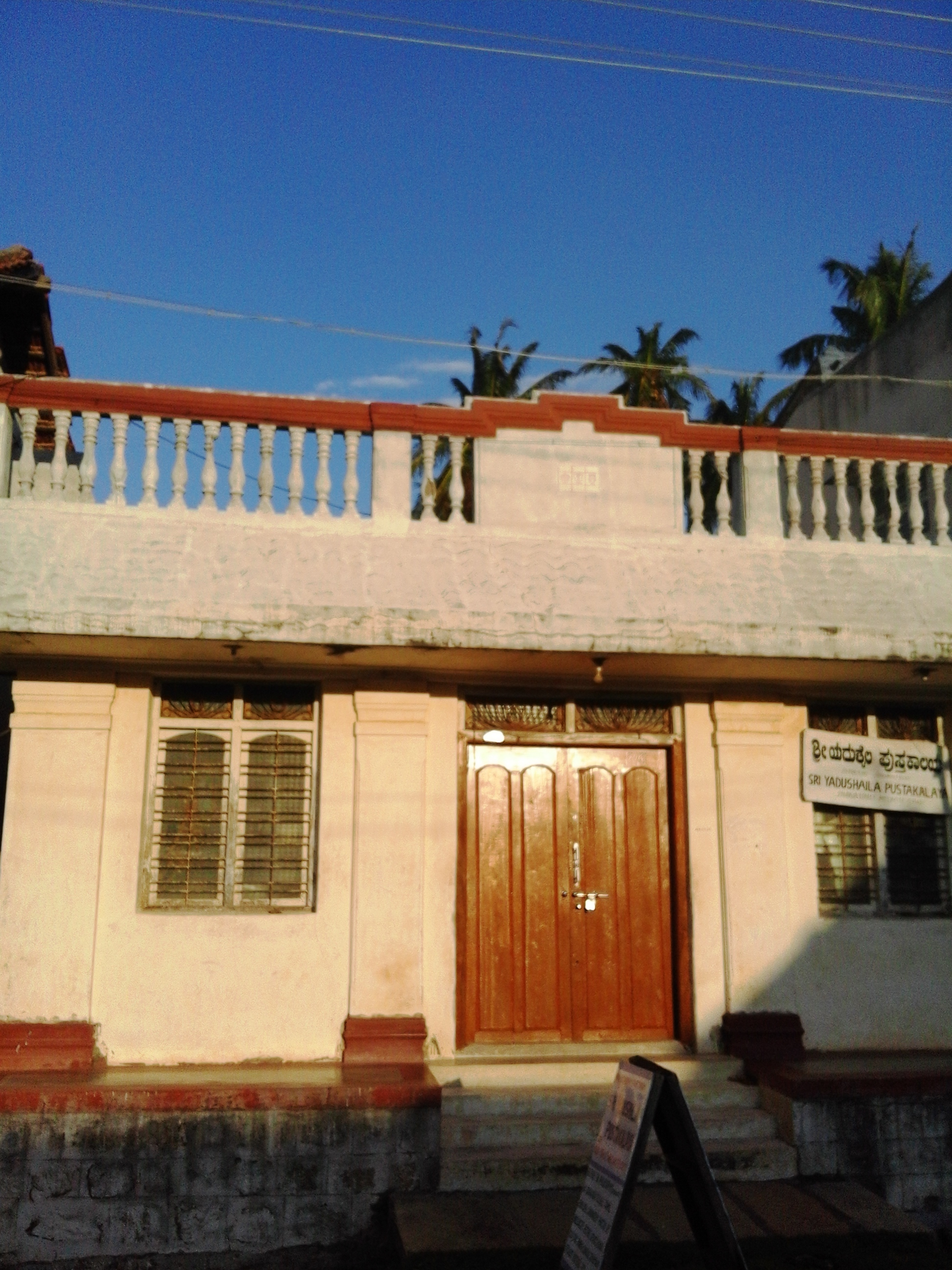
Yedushaila Bookstall

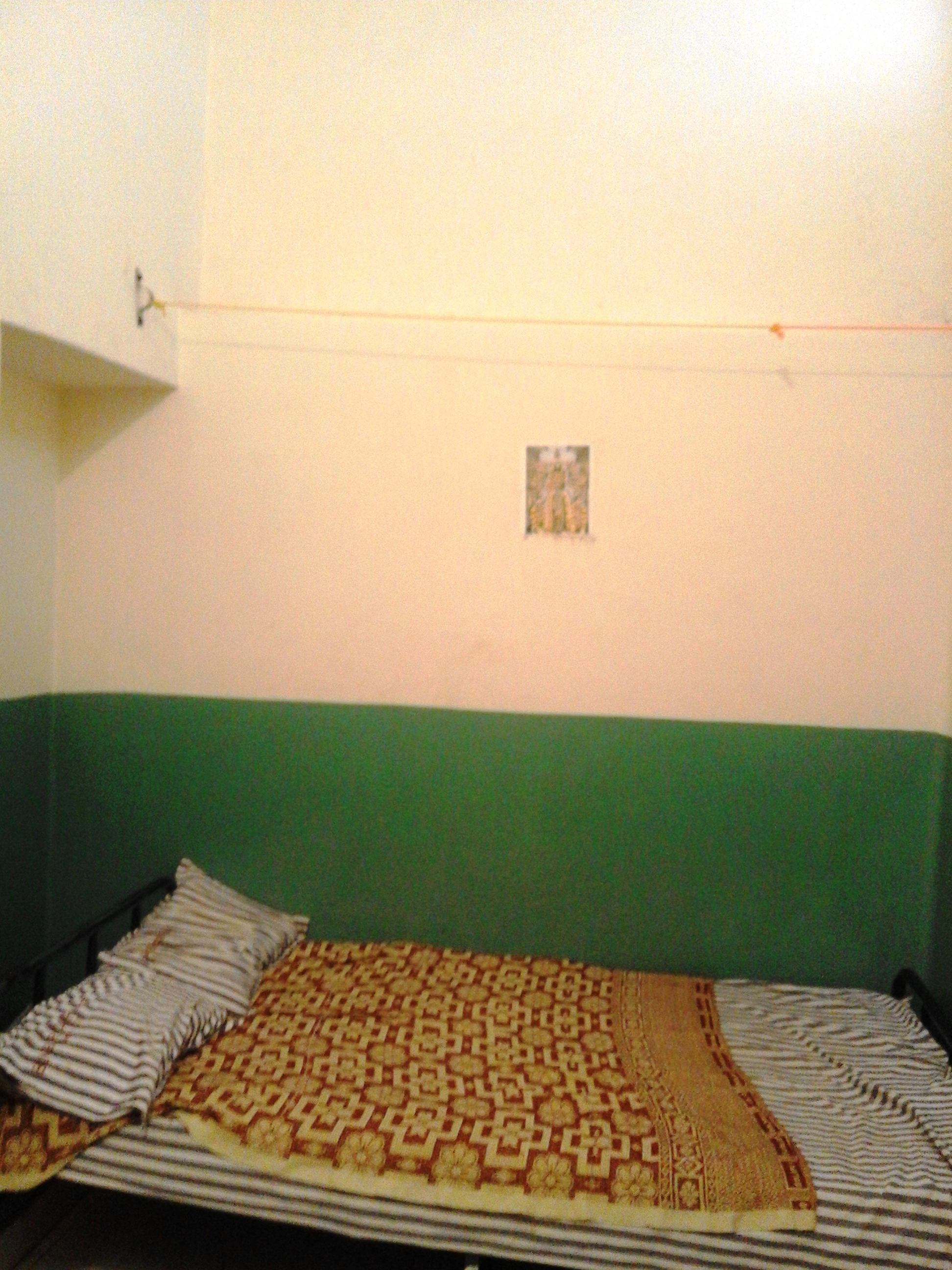
Temple Lodge

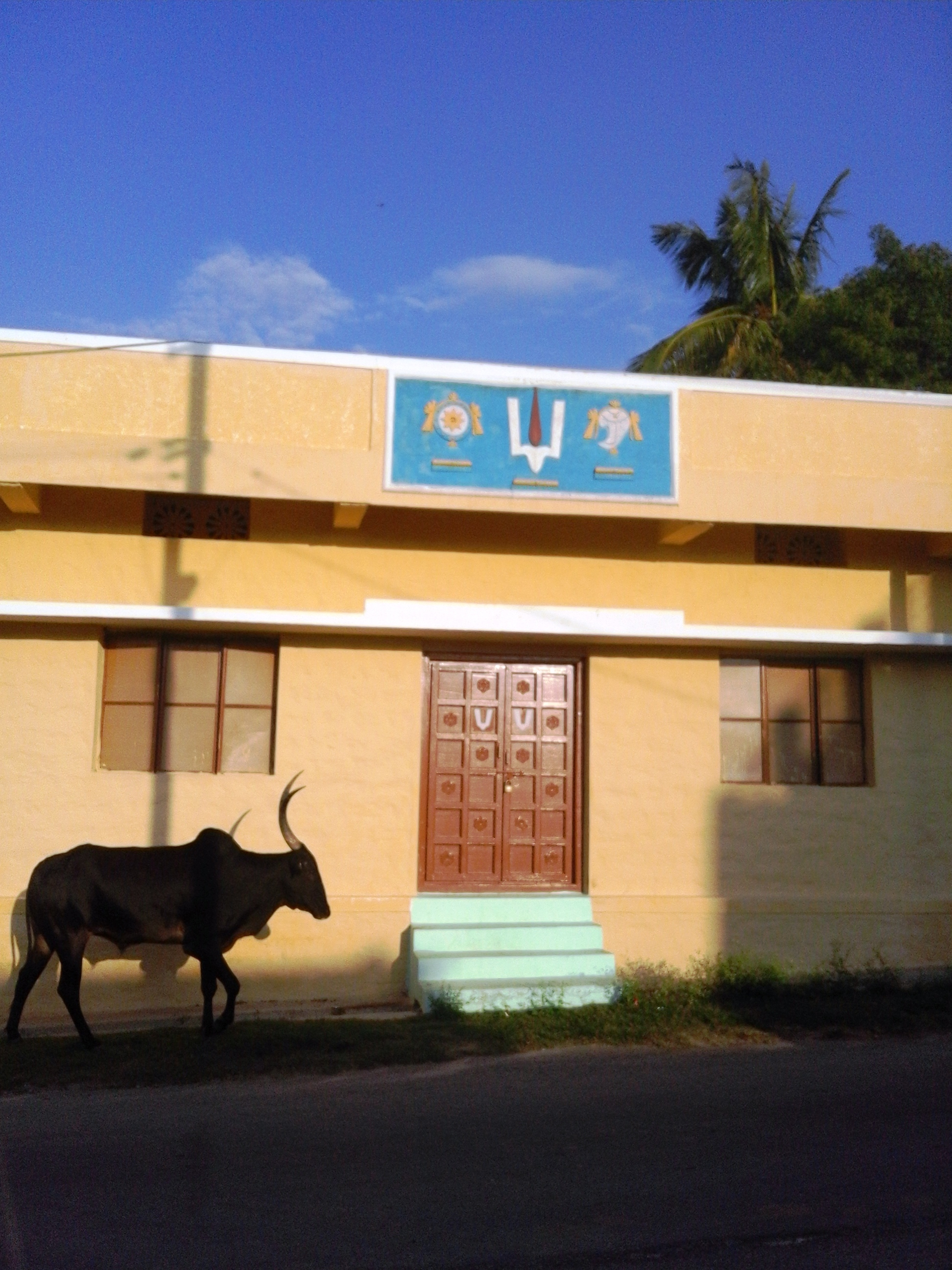
Old building
