= Gokak Falls, Belgaum =

Gokak Falls, Konnur, Belgavi Gokak Falls
- city
- Location in Konnur, Karnataka, India Gokak Falls, Konnur, Belgavi (India)
- Coordinates: 16.1913°N 74.7784°E
- Country: India
- State: Karnataka
- District: Belagavi

Population (2001)
  - Total: 10,042

Languages
  - Official: Kannada
- Time zone: UTC+5:30 (IST)
- Postal code: 591231
- Vehicle registration: KA49

Gokak Falls is a town in Belagavi district in the Indian state of Karnataka. It is under the control of municipal corporation Konnur, Karnataka.

== Demographics ==
As of 2001 India census, Gokak Falls had a population of 10,042. Males constitute 51% of the population and females 49%. Gokak Falls has an average literacy rate of 73%, higher than the national average of 59.5%: male literacy is 81%, and female literacy is 64%. In Gokak Falls, 12% of the population is under 6 years of age.

The Forbes Academy is the only English language school in Gokak Falls. Along with Volkart Academy as Kannada, Marathi and Urdu Language.
