= Mallinathaswamy Jain Temple, Mannargudi =

Temple in Tamil Nadu, India

1008 Shri Mallitheerthangarar Swamy Jain Temple
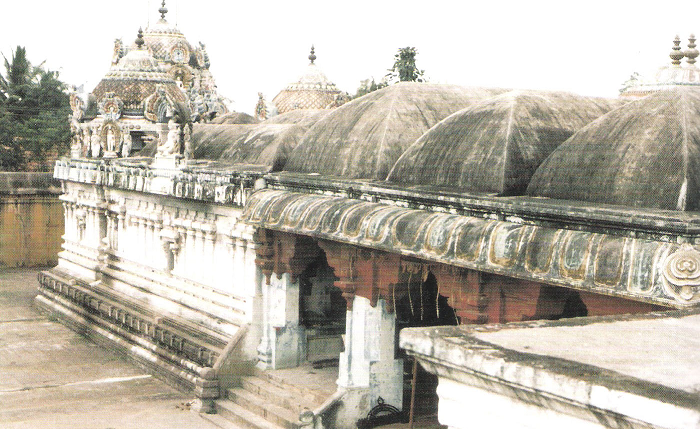
- Shri 1008 Mallitheerthangarar Swamy Jain Temple

- Location within Tamil Nadu

Religion
- Affiliation: Jainism
- Deity: Māllīnātha
- Festival: Mahavir Jayanti

Location
- Location: Mannargudi, Tamil Nadu, India
- Interactive map of 1008 Shri Mallitheerthangarar Swamy Jain Temple
- Coordinates: 10°40′25.8″N 79°26′19.6″E

Architecture
- Established: 12th Century

Mallinathaswamy Jain Temple (மன்னார்குடி மல்லிநாதசுவாமி ஜினாலயம்) is a Jain temple dedicated to the deity Jain, located in Mannargudi, an ancient town in the erstwhile Chola Empire in Tiruvarur District of Tamil Nadu, India. Mallinathaswamy or Māllīnātha is the 19th Tirthankara of the Jain faith.

== Other temples ==
There are also Jain temples in Kumbakonam, Thanjavur, Deepankudi and other places in Tamil Nadu.

== History ==
This is an ancient temple built during the reign of the Chola dynasty in the twelfth century. It is very famous among all the ancient tirths of Tamil Nadu. Apart from the idol of Bhagawan Mallinathar which is divine and very impressive there are idols of Dharma Devi, Saraswathi Devi, Padmavathy Devi, Jawalamalini Amman and other in the temple which are also miraculous and impressive.

The temple has sanctum sanctorum, Rajagopura, artha mandapa, front mandapa and maha mandapa. In front of the mandapa flagpost is found. Rajagopura has three tiers. The vimana has two tiers. In the front mandapa Rishabadeva is found, flanked by two yakshas. The Mahamandapa is found in the Maratta style. In the prakara sculptures of Tirttankara and Mahavira are found. Chariot mandapa and Vahana mandapa are also found in this temple.

== Presiding deity ==
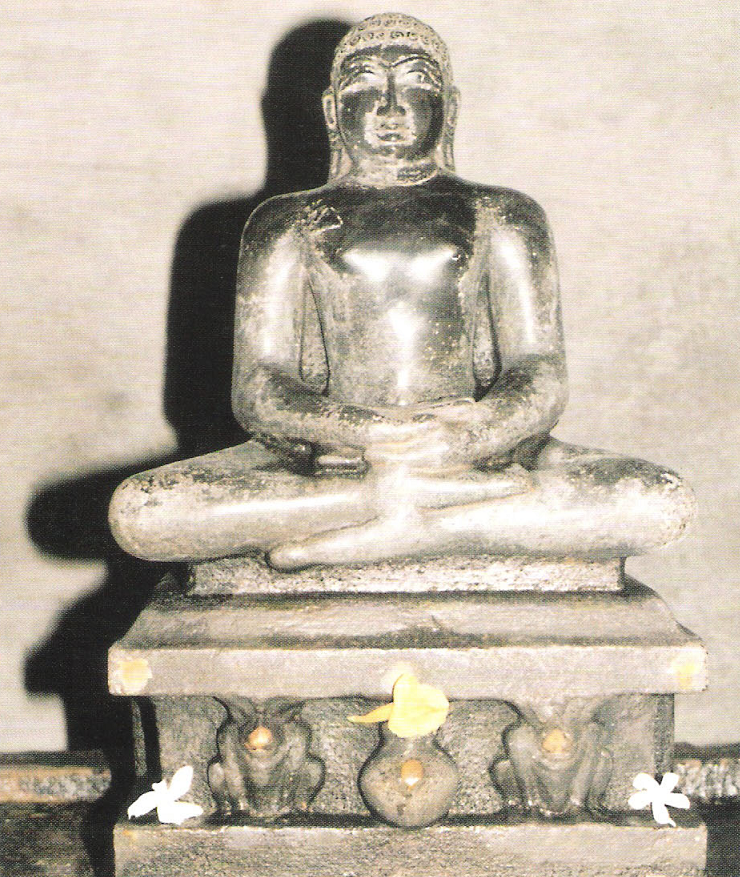
19th Jain Thirthankara Māllīnātha

The presiding deity is known as Mallinathaswamy and Mallinathar. The sculpture is of 56 cm height, and was made in 1986. The sculpture which was kept in sanctum sanctorum earlier is now found in the arthamandapa, as the nose of sculpture was found broken. The Processional deity is found in the mahamandapa.

== Festivals ==
Daily pujas are held. During Fridays Sukravara Puja and archana is done to Jwalamalini. Pournami is celebrated. During Tamil months of Vaikasi (Vaikasi Saptami is held after hoisting of flags), Adi, Avani, Puratassi, Aippasi (Mahaveer Parinivara Day), Karthigai (lighting of lamps) and Panguni (eight day festival known as Nandisvara Dveepa) are held. Bhajans are held during Marghazhi, with lighting of Mukkudai Deepam. Every year during the summer 11 day festival i.e. Thiruvizha or Bramorchavam will be celebrated in grand manner. Currently in Tamil Nadu it's happening in very few Jain temples. Last two days of the festival is very famous. 11th day Thiruvizha is called "Kannadi Pallakku", in this Sri Jawalamaini Amman will give darshan to the devotees. No other Jain temples in Tamil Nadu is having this unique Pallakku.

== See also ==
- Jainism in Tamil Nadu
- Tamil Jain
