= Kumbakonam Jain Temple =

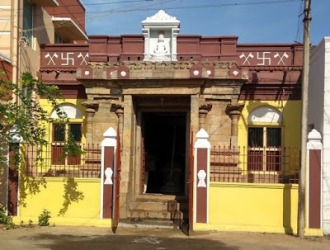
- Chandraprabha Jain Temple

Religion
- Affiliation: Jainism
- Deity: Chandraprabha
- Festival: Mahavir Jayanti

Location
- Location: Kumbakonam, Tamil Nadu
- Interactive map of Kumbakonam Jain Temple

Architecture
- Established: 1903 CE

Bhagawan Chandraprabha Jain Temple is a Jain temple dedicated to the deity Jain, located in the town of Kumbakonam in Thanjavur District Tamil Nadu, India

== Other Jain Temples ==
This temple is situated at Ramaswamy Temple West Street in Kumbakonam. There are also Jain temples in Thanjavur, Mannargudi, Deepankudi and other places in Tamil Nadu.

== Structure of the temple ==
The temple has sanctum sanctorum, front mandapa and maha mandapa. The entrance has no Gopuram. On either side of the sanctum sanctorum sasana devas are found. At the outside of the front mandapa, two guardian deities are found in either side.

== Presiding deity ==
The presiding deity is known as Chandraprabha. This is one of the oldest Jain temples in Kumbakonam. Several Tirttankara idols are found in this temple. He is the Eighth Tirttankara. Worship of Chandraprabha is going on in various places in Tamil Nadu.

== Worship ==
The construction of the temple took place in 1903. Panchakalyana festival took place in 1905. During morning and evening pujas are held to the presiding deity, Brahma deva, Jwalamalini.

== See also ==
- Arihant (Jainism)
- God in Jainism
- Jainism and non-creationism
- Tijara Jain Temple
- Jainism in Tamil Nadu
- Tamil Jain
