= Adisvaraswamy Jain Temple, Thanjavur =

Jain temple in Thanjavur, Tamil Nadu, India

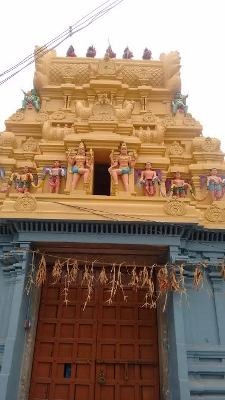
- Adisvaraswamy Jain Temple

Religion
- Affiliation: Jainism
- Deity: Rishabhanatha
- Festival: Mahavir Jayanti

Location
- Location: Karanthattankudi, Thanjavur, Tamil Nadu
- Interactive map of Adisvaraswamy Jain Temple, Thanjavur
- Coordinates: 10°48′15″N 79°08′06″E

Architecture
- Established: 15th century
- Temple: 8

Adisvaraswamy Jain Temple is a Jain temple dedicated to the deity Jain, located at Karanthattankudi in Thanjavur in Thanjavur District, Tamil Nadu, India

== Other Jain Temples ==
This temple is situated at Karanthattankudi (also known as Karunthittaikkudi) near Thanjavur. There are also Jain temples in Kumbakonam, Mannargudi, Deepankudi and other places in Tamil Nadu.

== Structure of the temple ==
The temple has sanctum sanctorum, Rajagopura, artha mandapa, front mandapa and maha mandapa. In front of the mandapa flagpost is found. Temple functions are held in front mandapa. On either side of the front mandapa, guardian deities are found on either side. In the four pillars of mahamandapa. Tirttankara sculptures are found. The vimana has two tiers. The shrine of mahasastha is found in the temple. This temple is said to be of 600 years old and the front mandapa, Jinavani shrine, Sasana deva shrine are of 300 years old. This is the only temple in Tamil Nadu having a separate shrine for Jinavani, with the structures of temple, such as sanctum sanctorum, arthamandapa, front mandapa and Prakaram. Kunthunatha sculpture is found here. There are shrines for Brahmadeva, Jwalamalini, Dharmadevi, Padmavati and Navagraha. There is a puja mandapam with 16 pillars. The temple also has a nandavana and temple tank.

== Presiding deity ==
The presiding deity is known as Adisvaraswamy and as Adhinathar. He is also known as Rishabhanatha, the First Tirttankara.

== Festivals ==
Festivals are held regularly. During Akshaya Tritiya, the deity goes around the temple. During the first Sundays of Tamil month of Adi Sasanadevi are going around the temple. During Navaratri, on seventh day, float festival is held.

== See also ==
- Arihant (Jainism)
- God in Jainism
- Jainism and non-creationism
- Tijara Jain Temple
- Jainism in Tamil Nadu
- Tamil Jain
