= Nehanurpatti =

Neganur Patti
- Location in Tamil Nadu, India
- 12.28734°N 79.444885°E
- Location: Gingee, India

Neganur Patti is a 1 sq. kilometre village in Gingee taluk in Villuppuram district in the Indian state of Tamil Nadu. The major occupation of the people living at this place is agriculture. In 2012 it had a population of 3000 people.

== Location ==
Neganur Patti is located 6 kilometres (3.7 mi) northeast of Gingee.

== Transportation ==
Town buses depart from Gingee bus stand (bus no: 11-A, 11-B) to Vedal go through Neganur Patti. Otherwise, one can alight at Melkalavai Koot road bus stop (all buses going from Gingee to Melmalayanur) and can take shared auto.

== About the village ==
Neganur Patti consists of small hillock called Adukkankal which is a Jain cave with prehistoric paintings, Tamil-Brahmi stone inscription and traces of the presence of Jain beds.

== Adukkankal Jain Beds ==
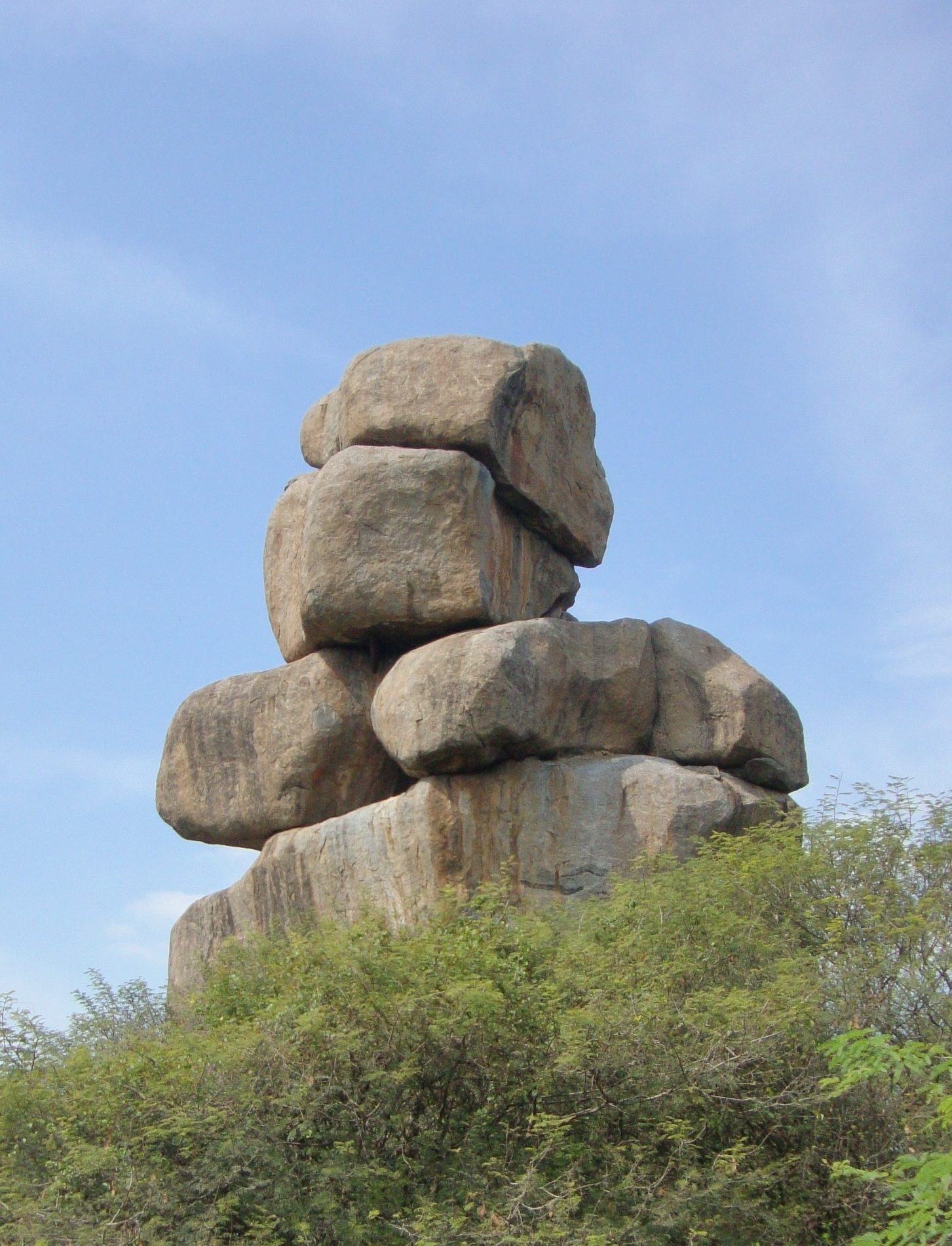
Adukkankal

The attractive feature of this village is the presence of hillock called Adukkankal. Since it looks as if large stones are piled up one over the other, it got its name (in Tamil "Adukku" means "pile up" and "kal" means "stone"). Just above the bottom of the hillock, Tamil-Brahmi Jain inscriptions are seen. In the bottom of this hillock, two caves are located on the either side. Both the caves contains the traces of stone beds possibly used by Jain monks. Also a small pond is seen near one of the caves. The floor of the cave were broken for construction works which needs protection.

== Tamil Brahmi Jain inscriptions ==
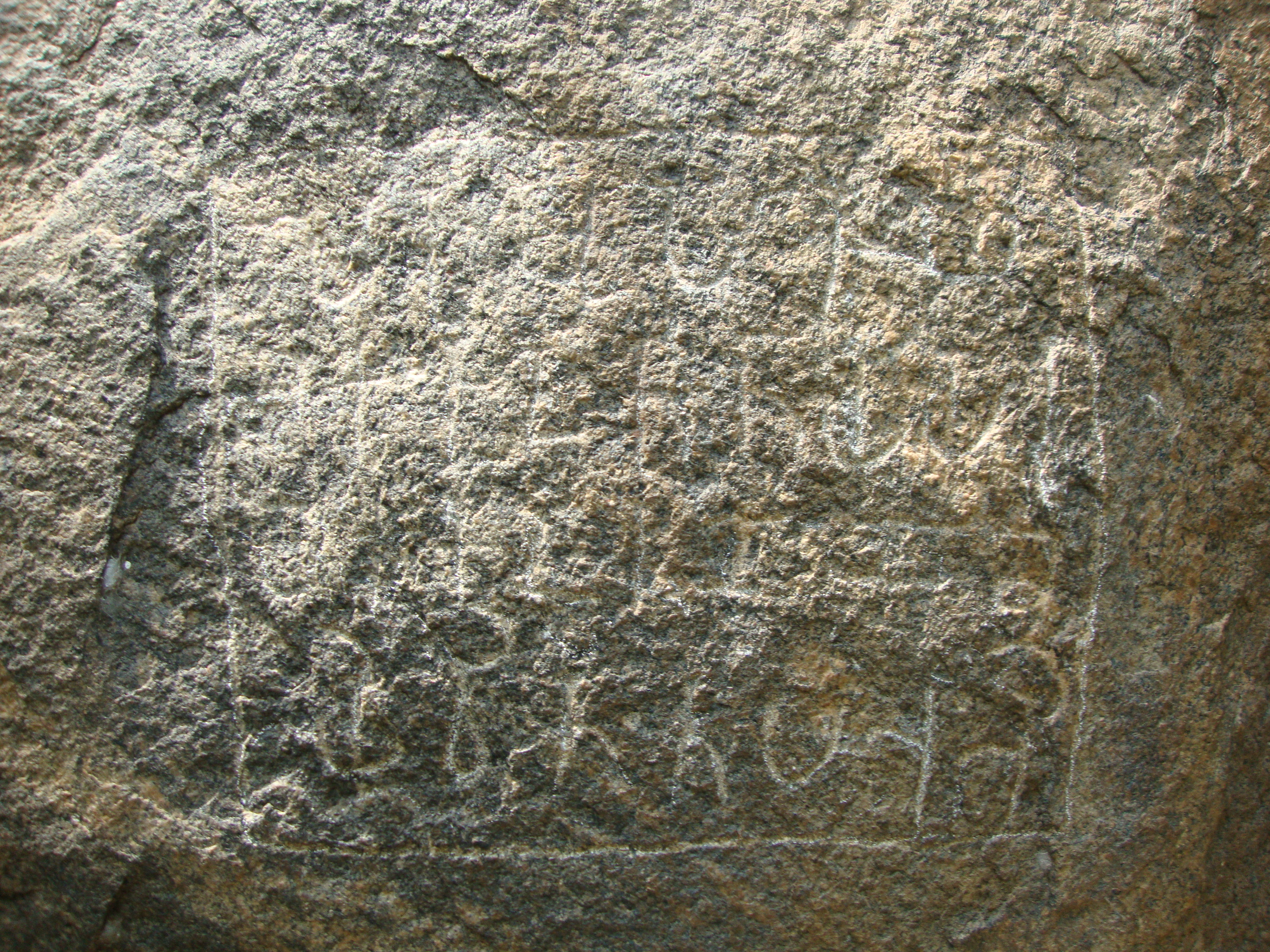
Tamil-Brahmi Jain Inscription

The 4th century C. E. Tamil-Brahmi letters on the adukkankal was first discovered by Archaeologist S. Rajavelu in 1992. The content of the script is " Perum pogazh sekkanthi thayiyuru sekkanthanni se vitha palli" (sekkanthanni, mother of sekkanthi of Perumpugozh village has built this abode) (Tamil: பெரும் பொகழ் சேக்கந்தி தாயியரு சேக்கந்தன்னி செ யி வித்த பள்ளி). Archeologists believe that sekkanthanni to be a female Jain saint and the village Perumpogazh might be the present day perumpugai village which is near to Neganur Patti.

== Rock paintings ==
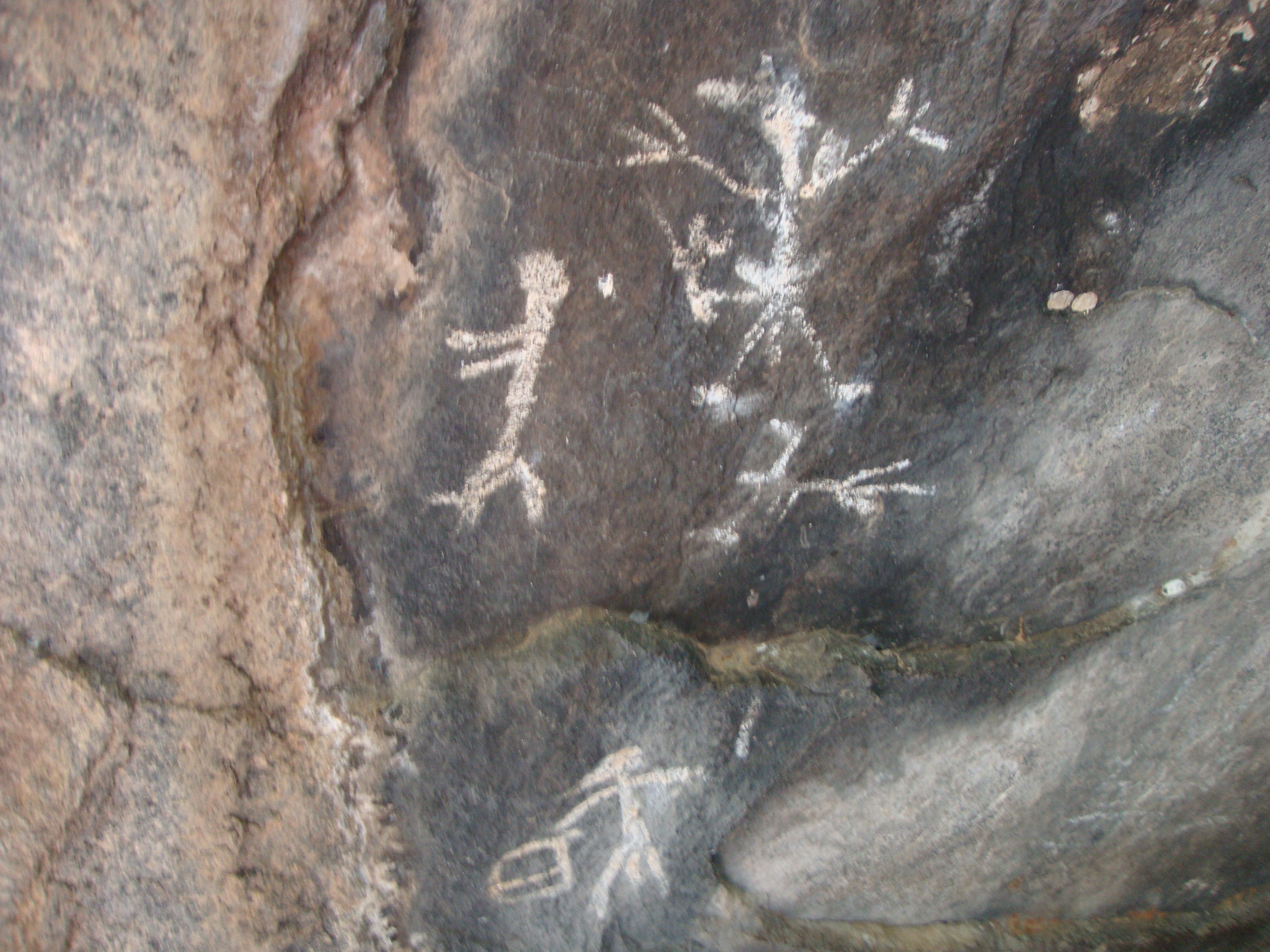
Men like images

Another interesting feature of this village is the presence of 1000 B.C. rock paintings in the adukkankal cave. These are white and hence these paints could be made by using lime. Only men is seen in the paintings. There are no animals painted. Some paintings are very weak and could not be able to resolve.

== See also ==
- Jainism in Tamil Nadu
