= Kanchiyur =

Kanjur
- Location in Tamil Nadu, India
- 12.204469°N 79.230652°E
- Location: Gingee, India

Kanjur or Kanchiyur is a hamlet in Gingee taluk in Villuppuram district in the Indian state of Tamil Nadu. The major occupation of the people living at this place is agriculture. In 2011 it had a population of 400.

== Location ==
Kanchiyur is located 37 kilometres (23 mi) northwest of Villupuram, 20 kilometres (12 mi) southeast of Thiruvannaamalai and 23 kilometres (14 mi) southwest of Gingee. Other rock art sites of Tamil Nadu, Kilvalai and Settavarai are located at 19 km and 3 km respectively from Kanchiyur.

== Transportation ==
Town buses depart from Thiruvannaamalai bus stand (bus no: 23) go to Neelandhaangal. From Neelandhaangal, Kanchiyur hillock is half a kilometre. Also, from Avur, every two hours mini buses are available to reach Neelandhaangal.

== About the village ==
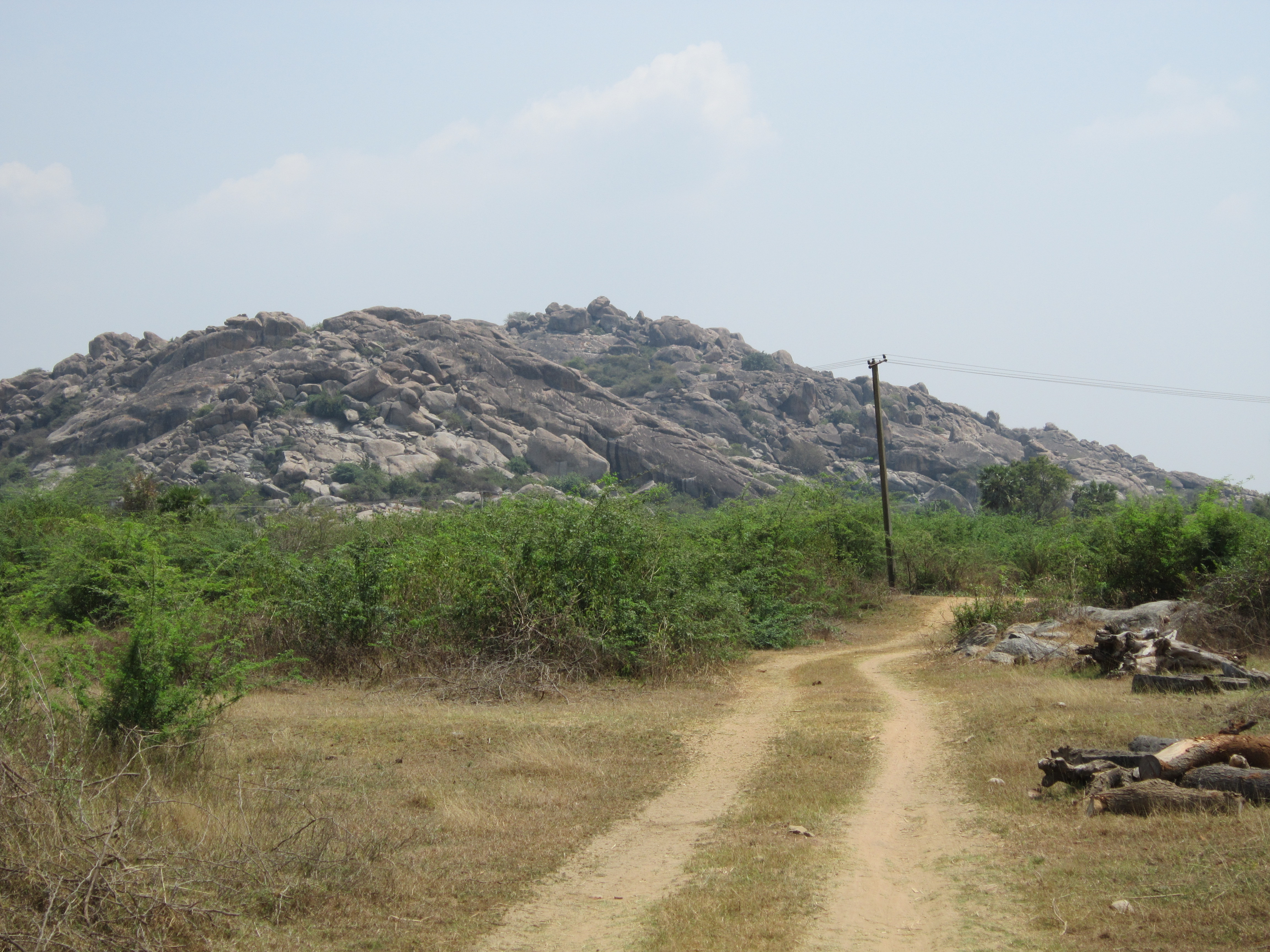
Kanchiyur Hillock

Kanchiyur has 3000 years of heritage. The historical importance of the village is demonstrated by the presence of a hillock with rock paintings from the 10th century BCE and Jain cave and stone beds from the 10th century CE. Some Tamil Jains are still living in Madhampoondi, a village near to Kanchiyur hillock.

== Jain cave and stone beds ==
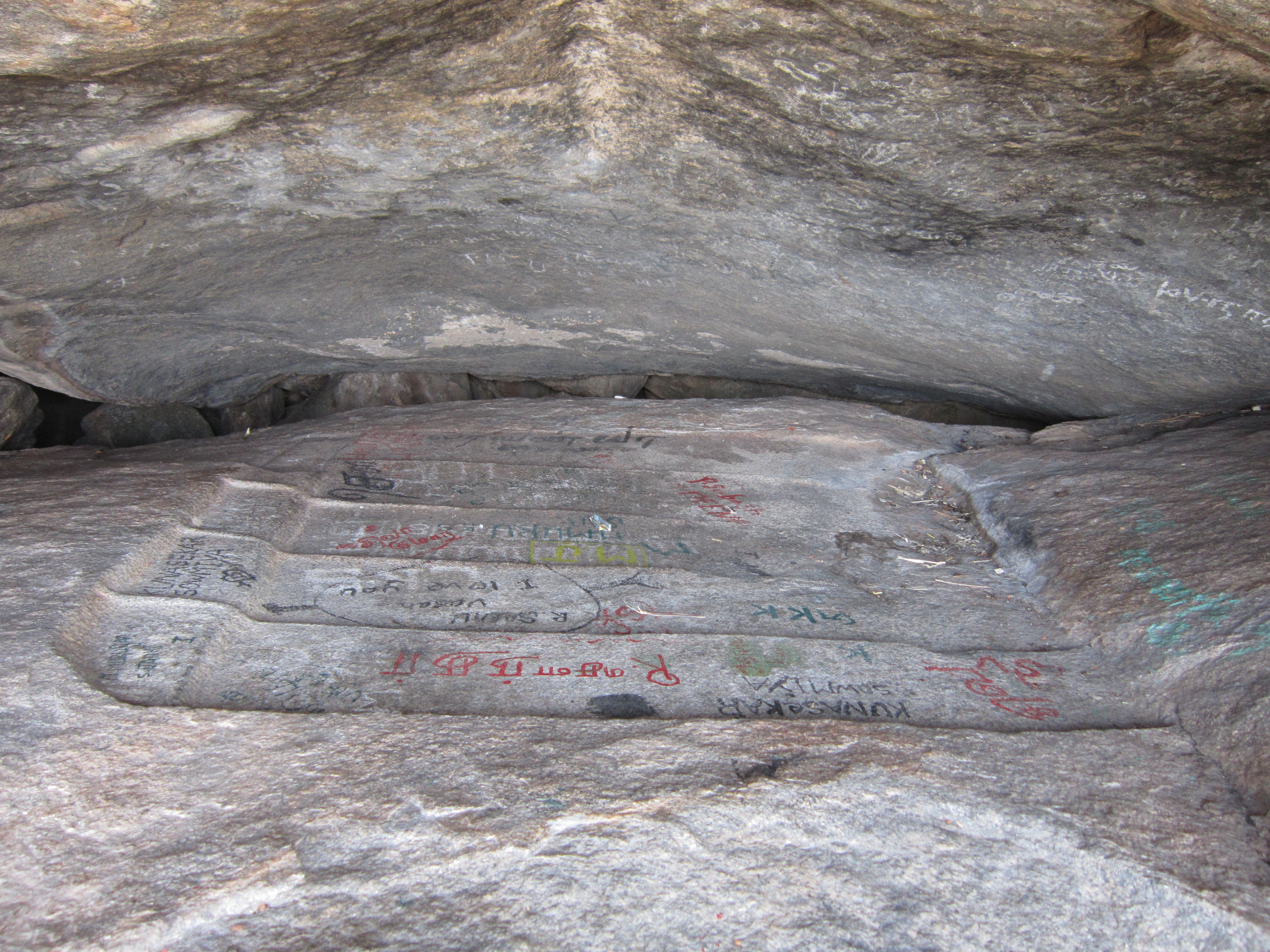
Jain beds 1

Kanchiyur hillock is about 400 feet in height. In the top of the hill, there is a cave which contains 10 stone beds on the floor. A stone seat also located near to the beds. All the stone beds have carved pillows. Among the 10 stone beds, pillows of four stone beds are carved semicircular (see the picture gallery) similar to that of found in Andimalai hillock of Cholapandiyapuram. Near the hill, broken pieces of pots belonging to 1st or 2nd centuries CE were found in large numbers.

== Rock paintings ==
Globally, the study of rock art and their interpretations gained momentum in the field of archaeology. Archeologists not only denoted the artistic skill of the people who had painted them, also their beliefs and their daily activities. The paintings on the rock shelters are mostly depicting the hunting scenes and human activities.

The rock paintings found here contains mainly symbols, painted in white ochre. Hence the pre-historic people might have used calcium to paint these symbols. These symbols painted here are similar to that of found in Indus Valley civilization.

== Picture gallery ==
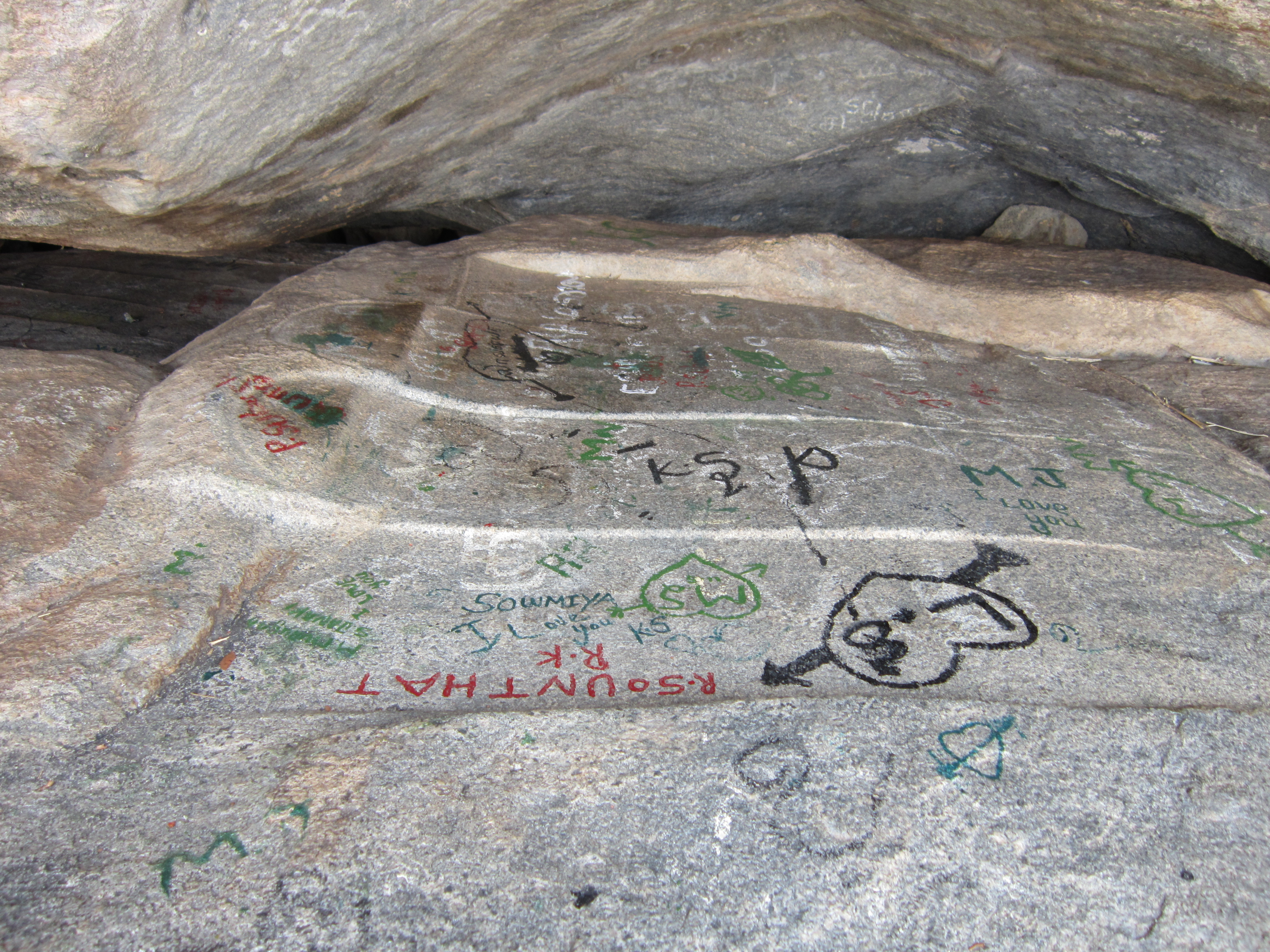
Jain beds 2

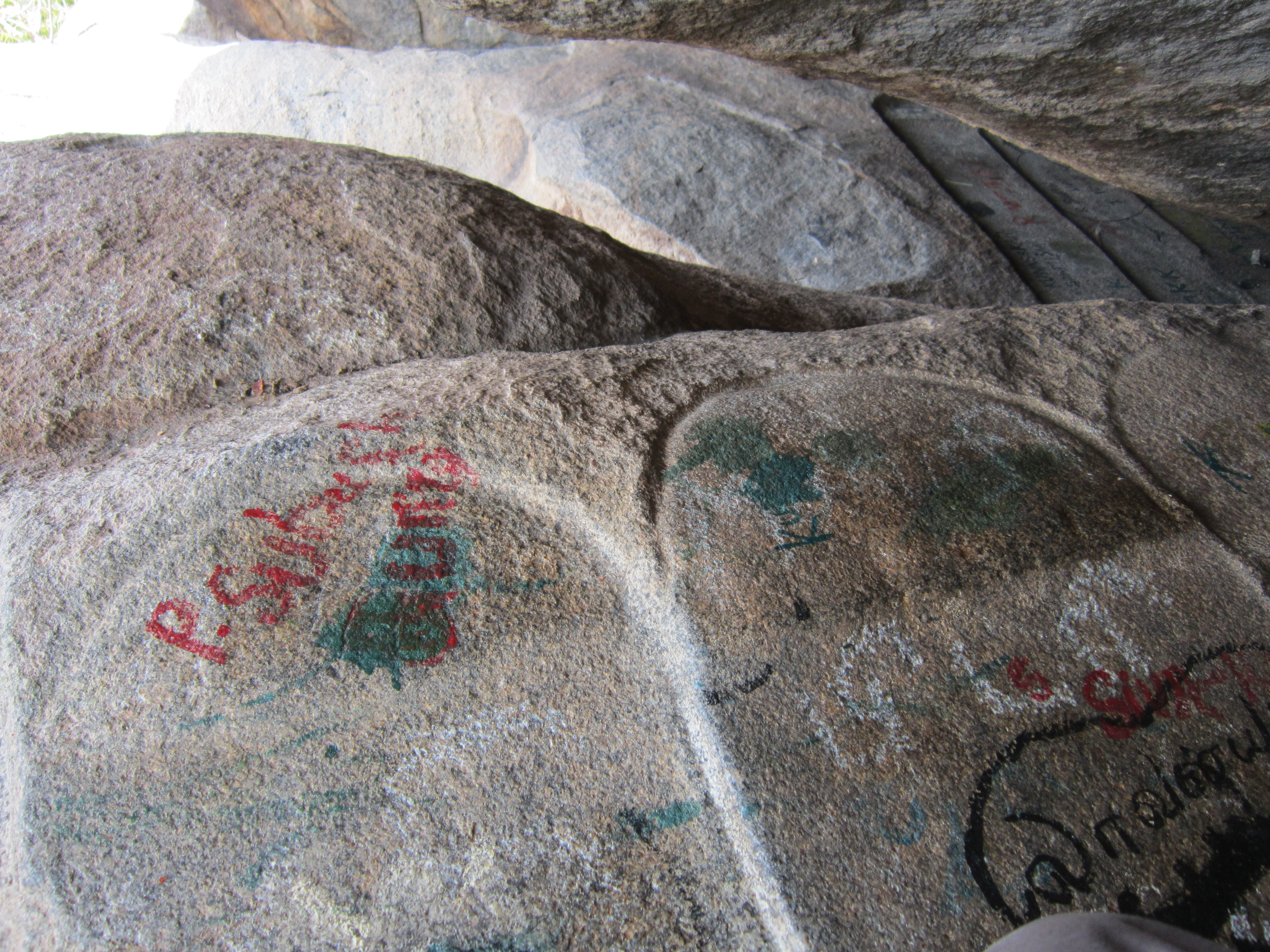
Semicircular stone pillows

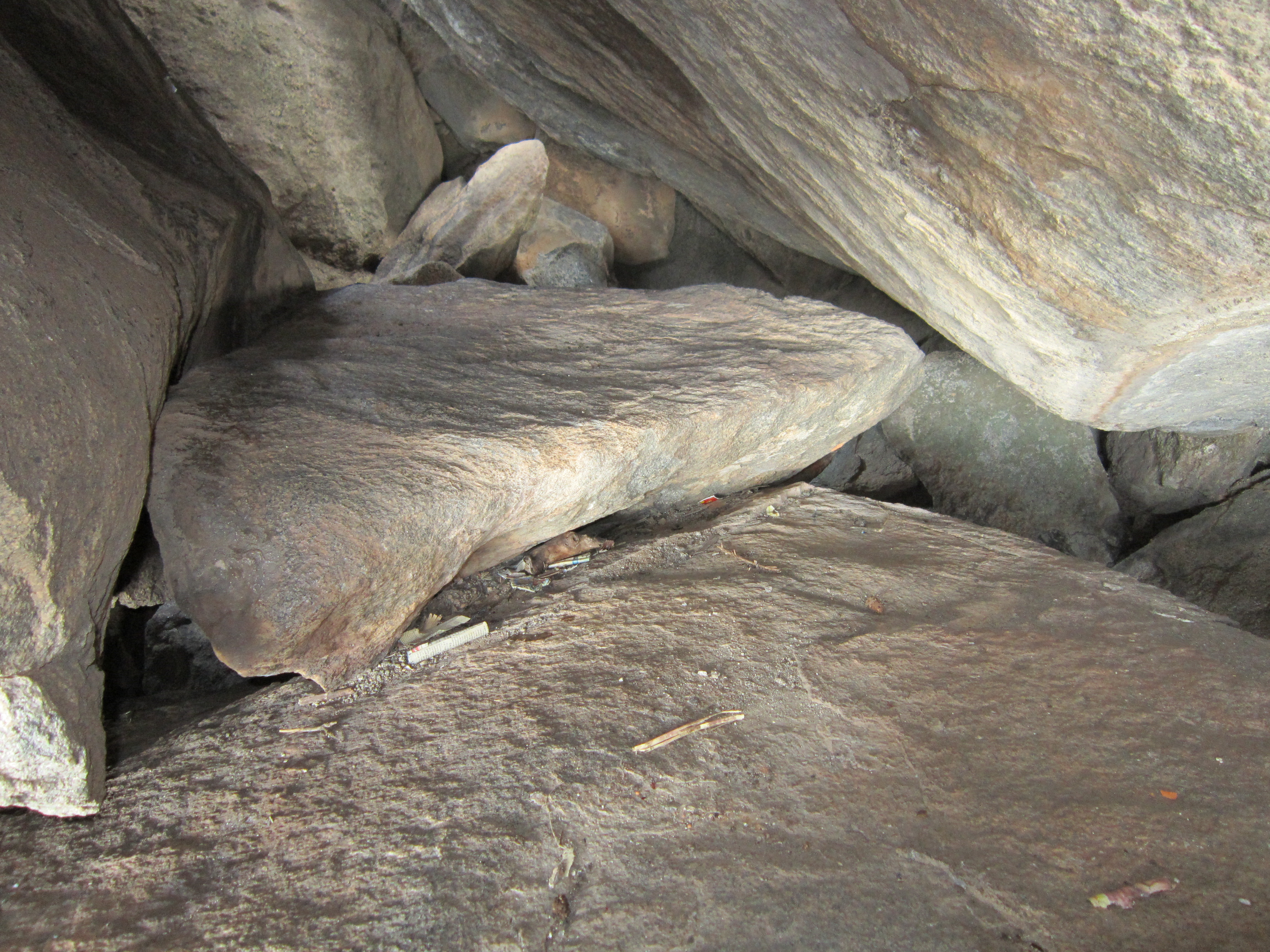
Stone seat

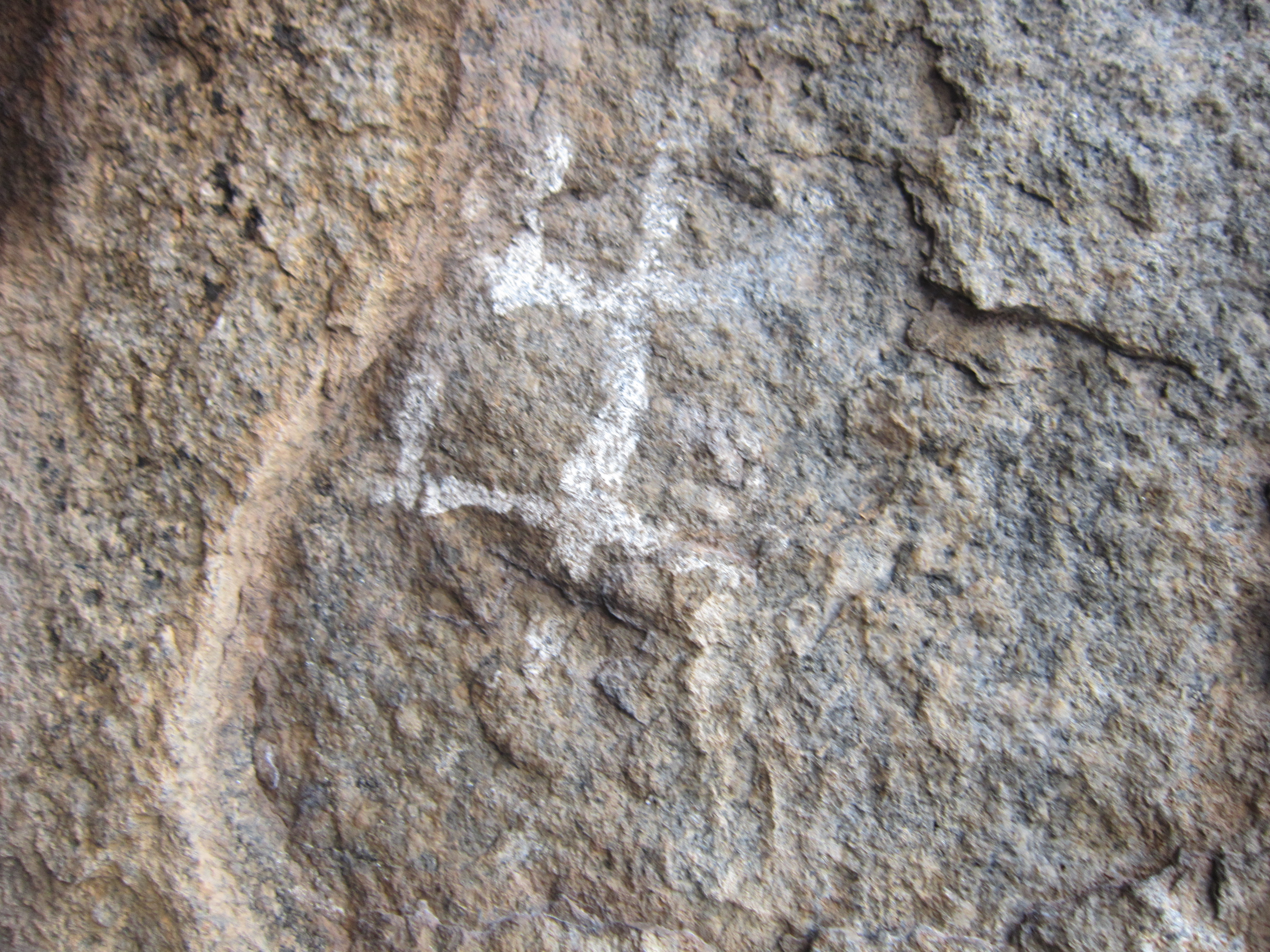
Symbol 1

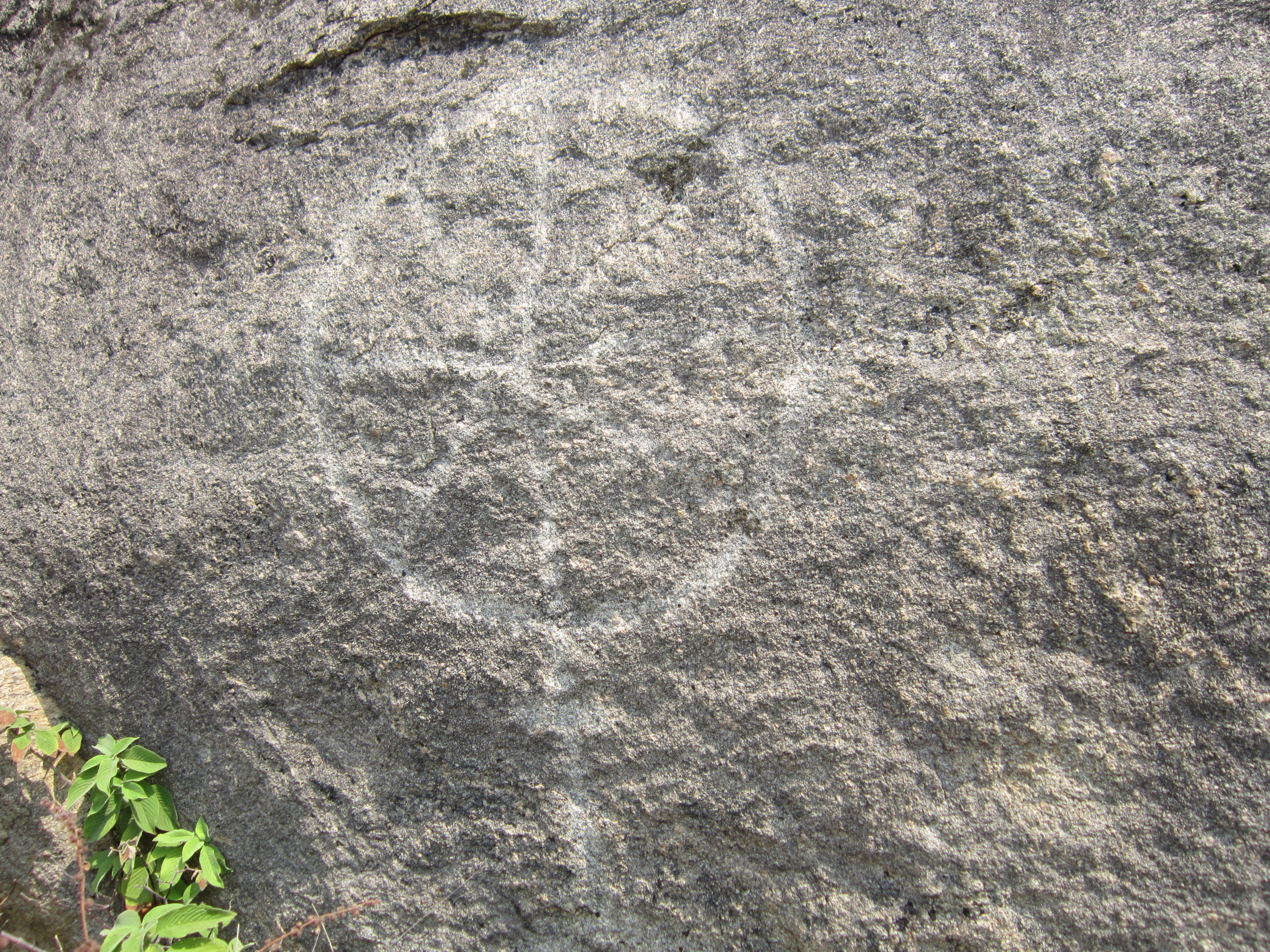
Symbol 2

== See also ==
- Jainism in Tamil Nadu
