= Jainism in Tamil Nadu =

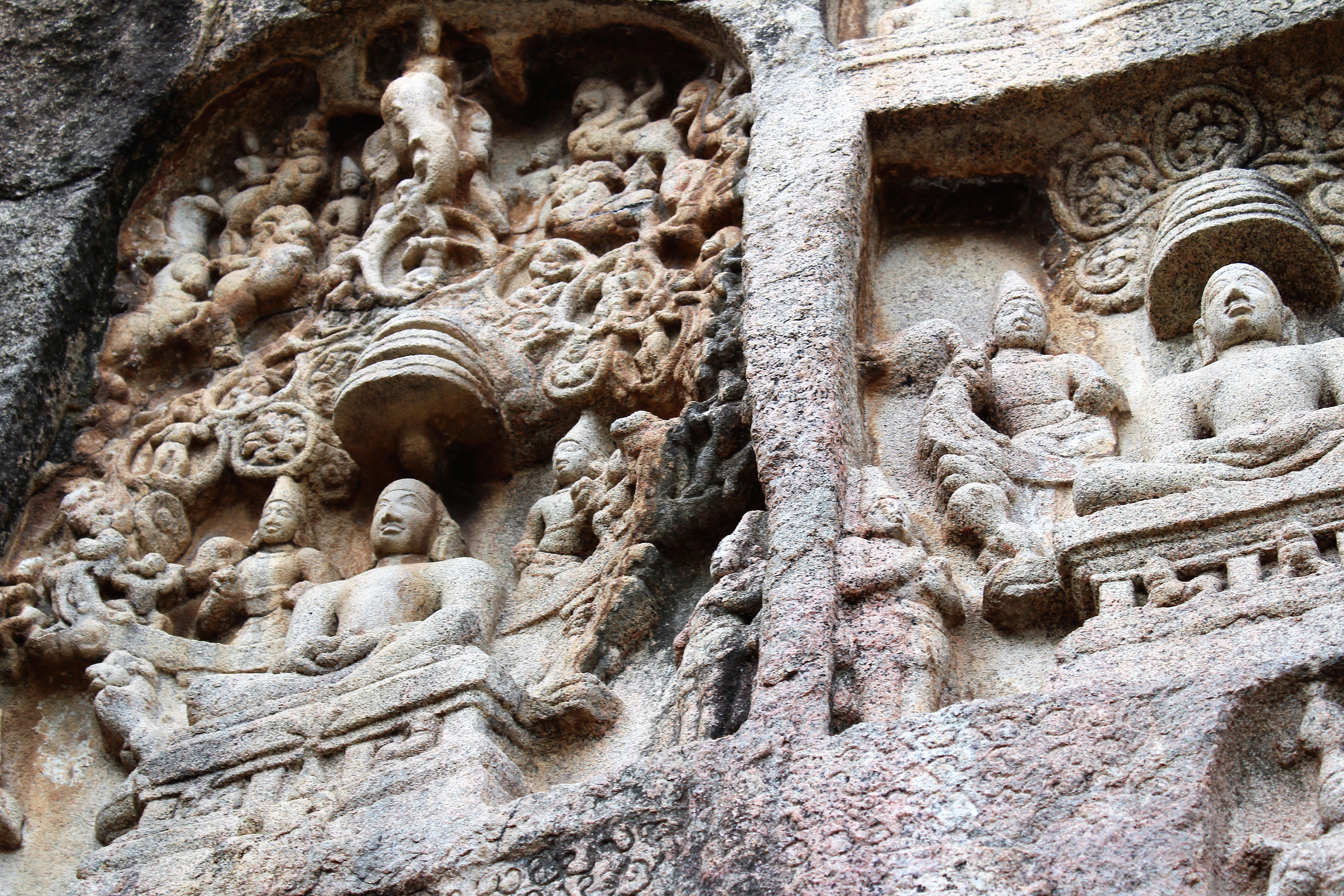
Kalugumalai Jain Beds

Jainism has an extensive history in the Indian state of Tamil Nadu, although practiced by a minority of Tamils in contemporary times. According to the 2011 India Census, Jains represent 0.12% of the total population of Tamil Nadu, and are of the Digambara sect. Tamil Jains are primarily concentrated in northern Tamil Nadu, in the districts of Viluppuram, Kanchipuram, Vellore, Tiruvannamalai, Cuddalore and Thanjavur.

== History ==
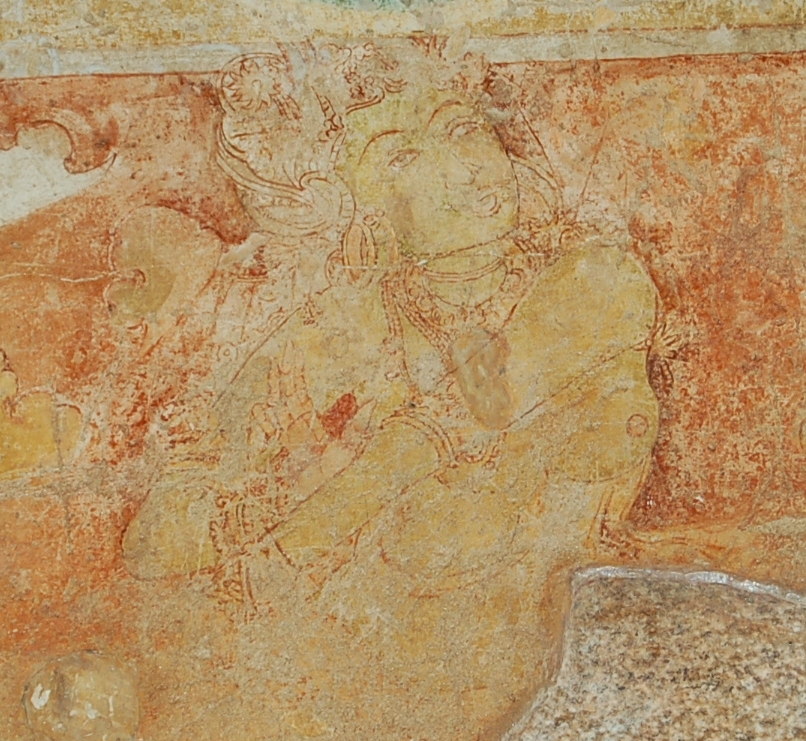
Sittanavasal Cave painting, 7th century

Early Tamil-Brahmi inscriptions in Tamil Nadu dated to the 3rd century BCE and describe the livelihoods of Tamil Jains. The oldest known Tamil kings were recorded to follow the Jain religion which makes Jainism, the second oldest religion in Tamil Nadu. Inscriptions dating back to 8th century CE were found in Tiruchirappalli narrating the presence of Jain monks in the region.

The Kalabhra dynasty, who were patrons of Jainism, ruled over the entire ancient Tamil country in the 3rd–7th century CE.

Pallavas followed Hinduism but also patronized Jainism. The Trilokyanatha Temple in Kanchipuram and Chitharal Jain Temple were built during the reign of the Pallava dynasty.

The Pandyan kings were initially Jains but later became Shaivaites. The Sittanavasal Cave and Samanar Malai are Jain complexes that were built during the reign of Pandyan dynasty.

The Cholas patronised Hinduism, however, Jainism also flourished during their rule. The construction of Tirumalai cave complex was commissioned Queen Kundavai, elder sister of Rajaraja Chola I. The Tirumalai cave complex consists of 3 Jain caves, 2 Jain temples and a 16 metres (52 ft) high sculpture of Tirthankara Neminatha which is the tallest idol of Neminatha and the largest Jain idol in Tamil Nadu. The Digambara Jain Temple in Thirakoil and the Mallinathaswamy Jain Temple in Mannargudi were both built during the reign of the Chola dynasty.

=== Decline of Jainism ===
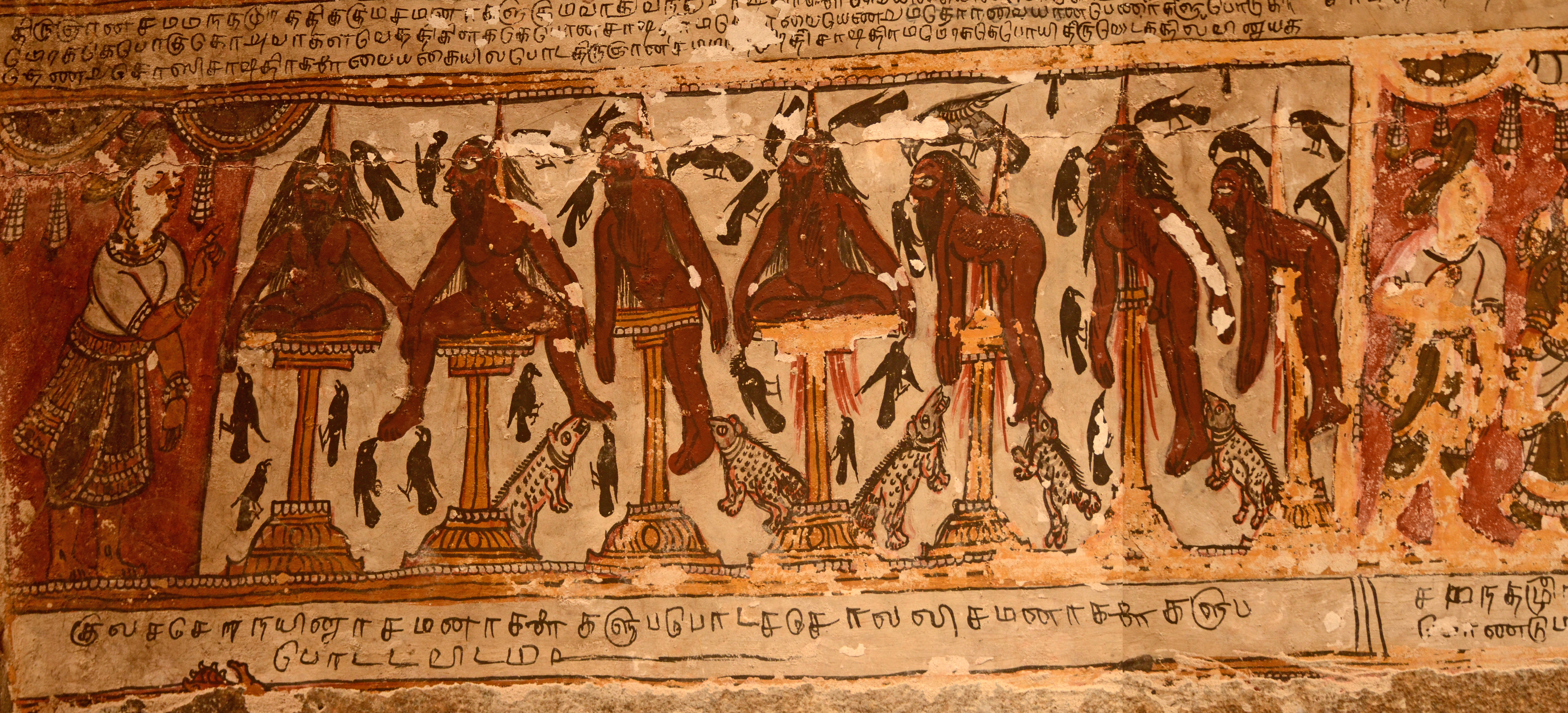
Impalement of Jains by Sambandar at Madurai

Royal patronage has been a key factor in the growth as well as the decline of Jainism. The Pallava king Mahendravarman I (600–630 CE) converted from Jainism to Shaivism under the influence of Appar. His work Mattavilasa Prahasana ridicules certain Shaiva sects and the Buddhists and also expresses contempt towards Jain ascetics. Sambandar converted the contemporary Pandya king to Shaivism. During the 11th century, Basava, a minister to the Jain king Bijjala II, succeeded in converting numerous Jains to the Lingayat Shaivite sect. The Lingayats destroyed various temples belonging to Jains and adapted them to their use. The Hoysala king Vishnuvardhana (c. 1108–1152 CE) became a follower of the Vaishnava sect under the influence of saint Ramanuja, after which Vaishnavism grew rapidly.

== Art ==
=== Influence on Tamil literature ===
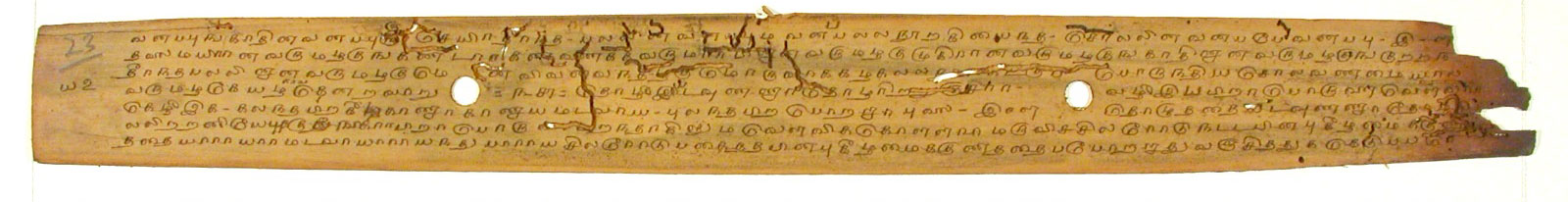
A palm leaf manuscript with ancient Tamil text Cīvaka Cintāmaṇi

Parts of the Sangam literature in Tamil are attributed to Jain authors.

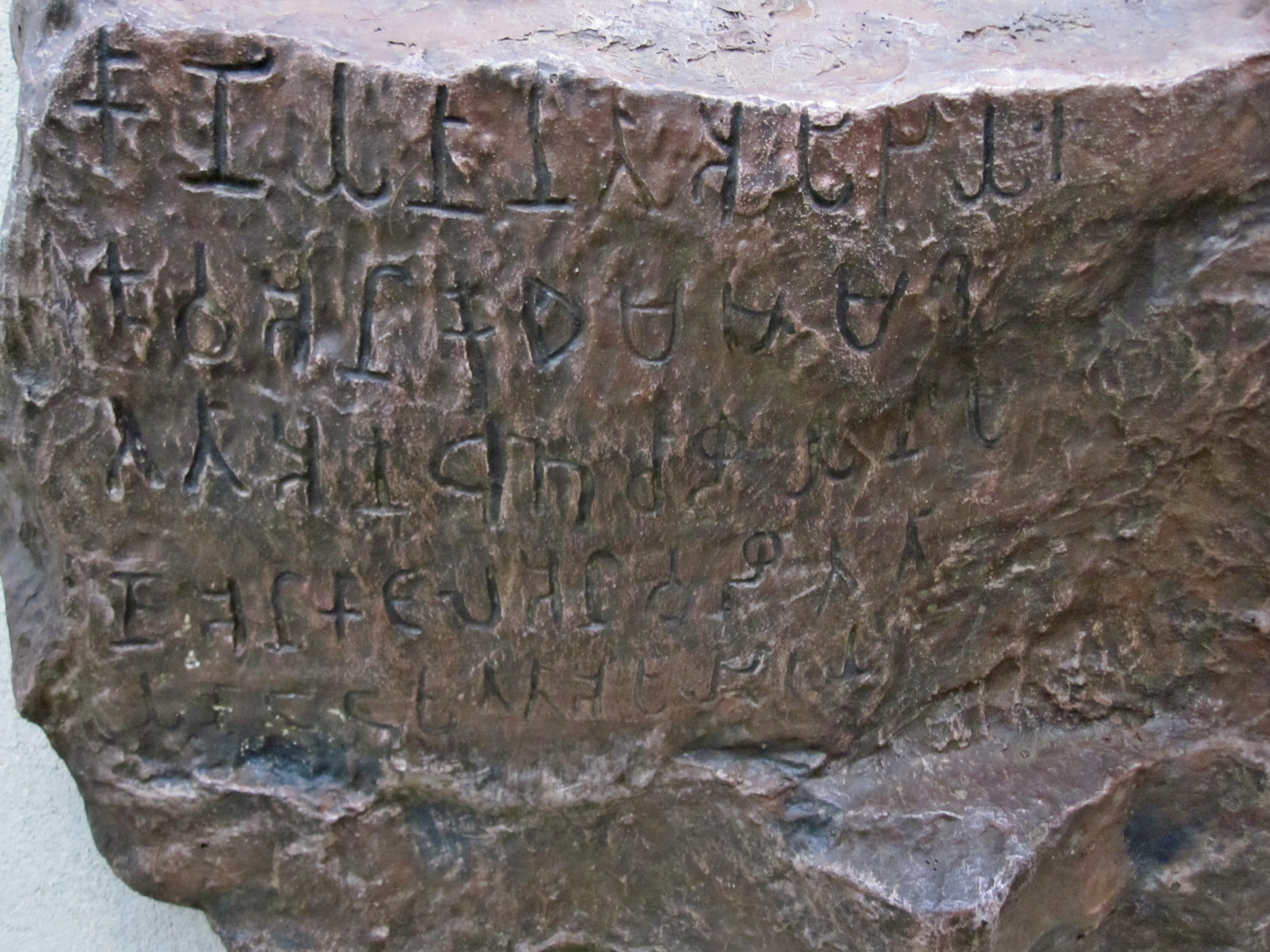
Mangulam inscription dated 3rd century BCE

Parts of the Sangam literature in Tamil are attributed to Jains. Tamil Jain texts such as the Cīvaka Cintāmaṇi and Nālaṭiyār are credited to Digambara Jain authors. These texts have seen interpolations and revisions. For example, it is generally accepted now that the Jain nun Kanti inserted a 445-verse poem into Cīvaka Cintāmaṇi in the 12th century. The Tamil Jain literature, according to Dundas, has been "lovingly studied and commented upon for centuries by Hindus as well as Jains". The themes of two of the Tamil epics, including the Silapadikkaram, have an embedded influence of Jainism. Some scholars believe that the author of the oldest extant work of literature in Tamil (3rd century BCE), Tolkāppiyam, was a Jain. S. Vaiyapuri Pillai suggests that Tolkappiyar was a Jain scholar well-versed in the Aintiram grammatical system and posits a later date, placing him in southern Kerala around the 5th century CE. Notably, Tolkappiyam incorporates several Sanskrit and Prakrit loanwords, reflecting its historical and linguistic context.

A number of Tamil-Brahmi inscriptions have been found in Tamil Nadu that date from the 3nd century BCE. They are regarded to be associated with Jain monks and lay devotees.

Naṉṉūl (Tamil: நன்னூல்) is a work on Tamil grammar written by a Tamil Jain ascetic Pavananthi Munivar around 13th century CE. It is the most significant work on Tamil grammar after Tolkāppiyam.

Some scholars consider the Tirukkural by Valluvar to be the work by a Jain. It emphatically supports moral vegetarianism (Chapter 26) and states that giving up animal sacrifice is worth more than a thousand offerings in fire (verse 259).

Silappatikaram, a major work in Tamil literature, was written by a Samaṇa(jain), Ilango Adigal. It describes the historical events of its time and also of the then-prevailing religions, Jainism, and Shaivism. The main characters of this work, Kannagi and Kovalan, who have a divine status among Tamils, were Jains.

According to George L. Hart, the legend of the Tamil Sangams or "literary assemblies" was based on the Jain sangham at Madurai:

There was a permanent Jaina assembly called a Sangha established about 604 CE in Maturai. It seems likely that this assembly was the model upon which tradition fabricated the cangkam legend."

Jainism began to decline around the 8th century, with many Tamil kings embracing Hindu religions, especially Shaivism. Still, the Chalukya, Pallava and Pandya dynasties embraced Jainism.

=== Jain structures ===
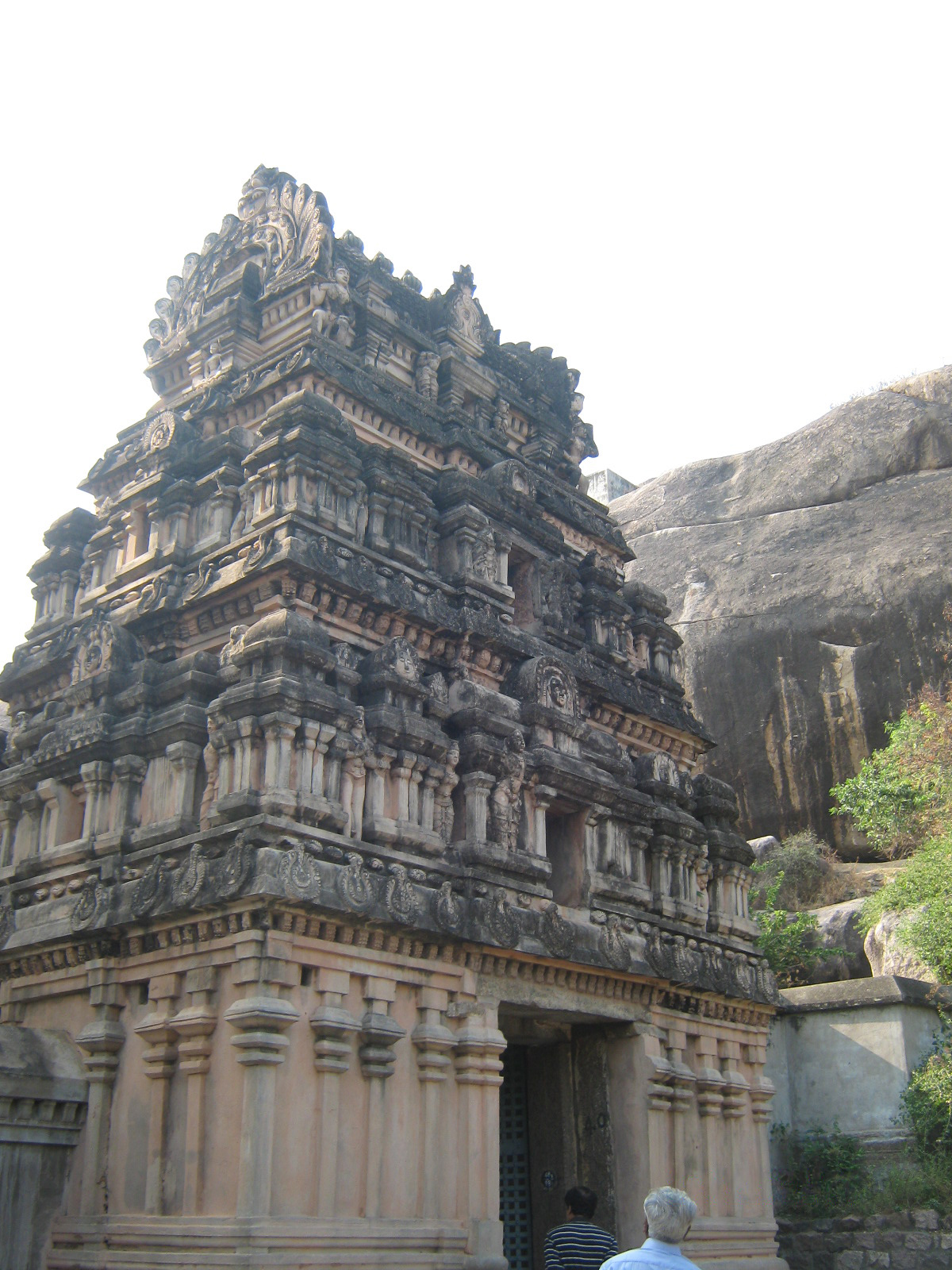
Mahavir Swami temple, Tirumalai

There are 26 caves, 200 stone beds, 60 inscriptions, and over 100 sculptures in and around Madurai. This is also the site where Jain ascetics wrote great epics and books on grammar in Tamil.

The Sittanavasal Cave temple is regarded as one of the finest examples of Jain art. It is the oldest and most famous Jain centre in the region. It possesses both an early Jain cave shelter, and a medieval rock-cut temple with excellent fresco paintings comparable to Ajantha paintings; the steep hill contains an isolated but spacious cavern. Locally, this cavern is known as "Eladipattam", a name that is derived from the seven holes cut into the rock that serve as steps leading to the shelter. Within the cave there are seventeen stone beds aligned in rows; each of these has a raised portion that could have served as a pillow loft. The largest stone bed has a distinct Tamil-Brahmi inscription assignable to the 2nd century BCE, and some inscriptions belonging to the 8th century BCE are also found on the nearby beds. The Sittannavasal cavern continued to be the "Holy Sramana Abode" until the 7th and 8th centuries. Inscriptions over the remaining stone beds name mendicants such as Tol kunrattu Kadavulan, Tirunilan, Tiruppuranan, Tittaicharanan, Sri Purrnacandran, Thiruchatthan, Ilangowthaman, Sri Ulagathithan, and Nityakaran Pattakali as monks.

The Kalugumalai temple from the 8th century CE marks the revival of Jainism in Tamil Nadu. This cave temple was built by King Parantaka Nedunjadaiya of Pandyan dynasty.

Mel Sithamur Jain Math is headed by the primary religious head of this community, Bhattaraka Laxmisena Swami.

== Complexes ==
- Tirumalai
- Kalugumalai Jain Beds
- Karanthai Jain temple
- Thirakoil
- Samanar Hills
- Sittanavasal Cave
- Armamalai Cave
- Mangulam
- Vallimalai Jain caves
- Thirupparankundram Rock-cut Cave and Inscription
- Kurathimalai, Onampakkam
- Panchapandavar Malai
- Seeyamangalam temple
- Thirupanamur Jain Temple
- Kanchiyur Jain cave and stone beds
- Andimalai Stone beds, Cholapandiyapuram
- Adukkankal, Nehanurpatti
- Ennayira Malai
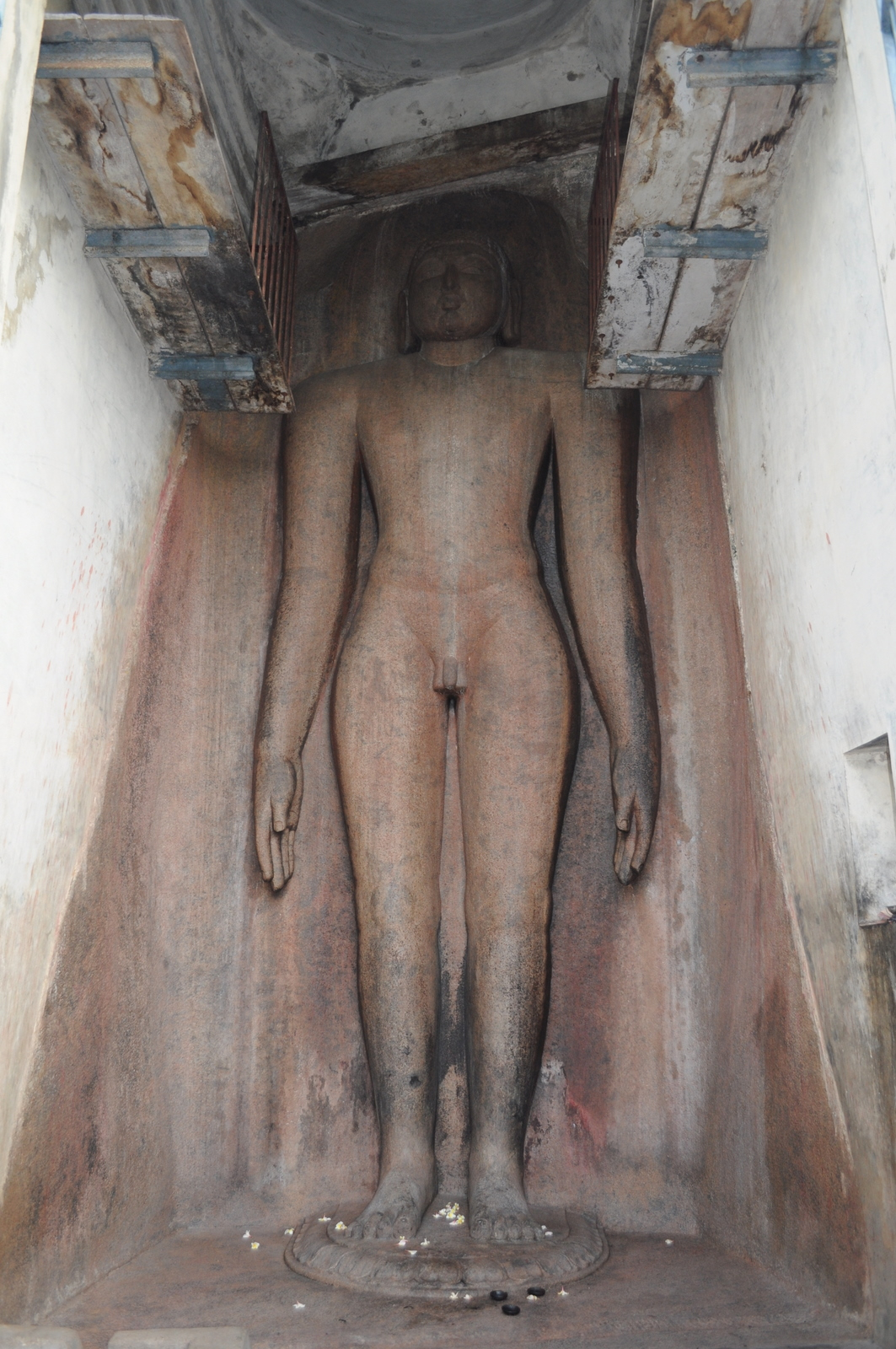
The 16 meter statue of Neminath, the tallest Jain sculpture in Tamil Nadu.

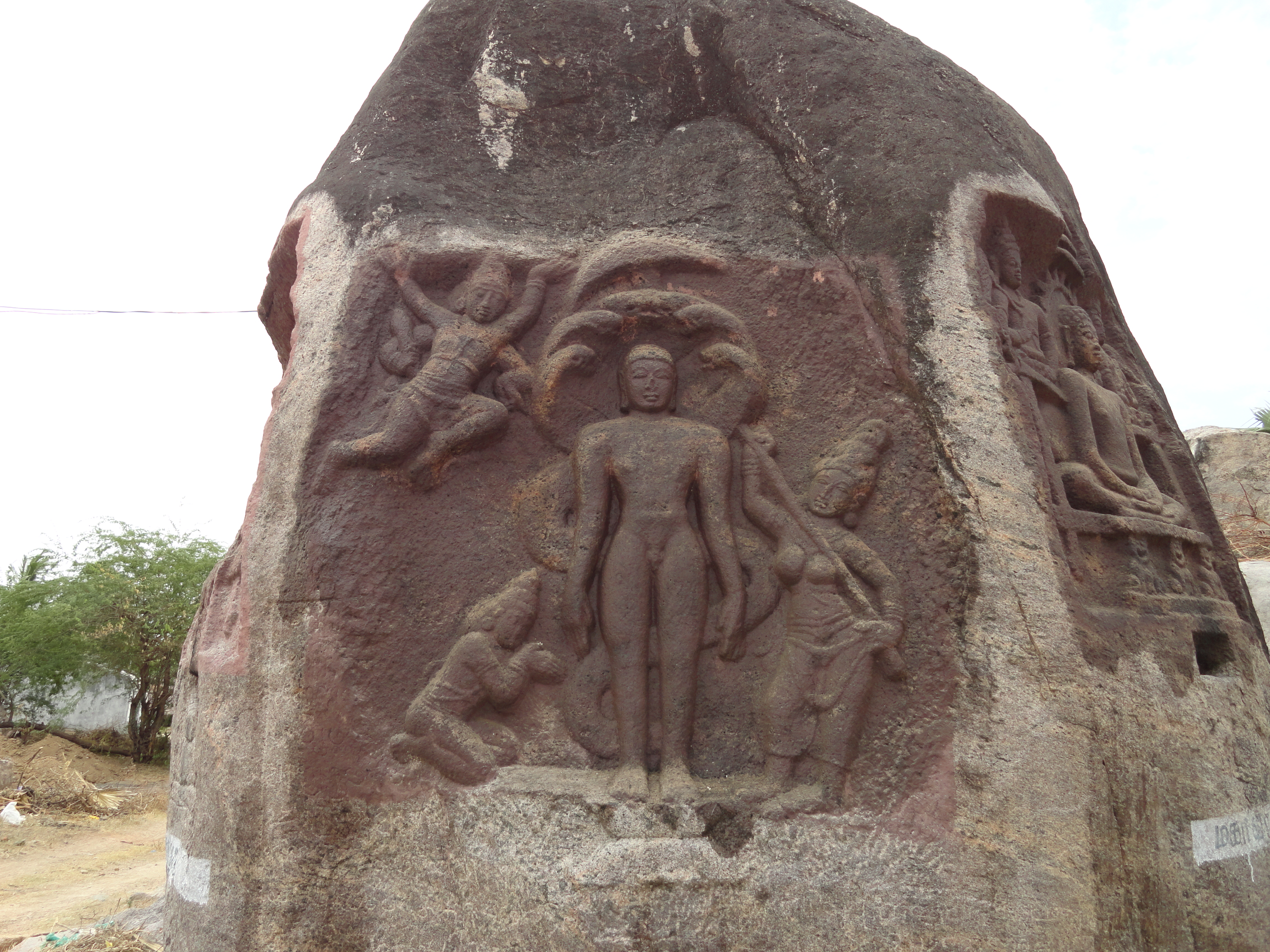
Parshvanatha at Thirakoil, 8th Century

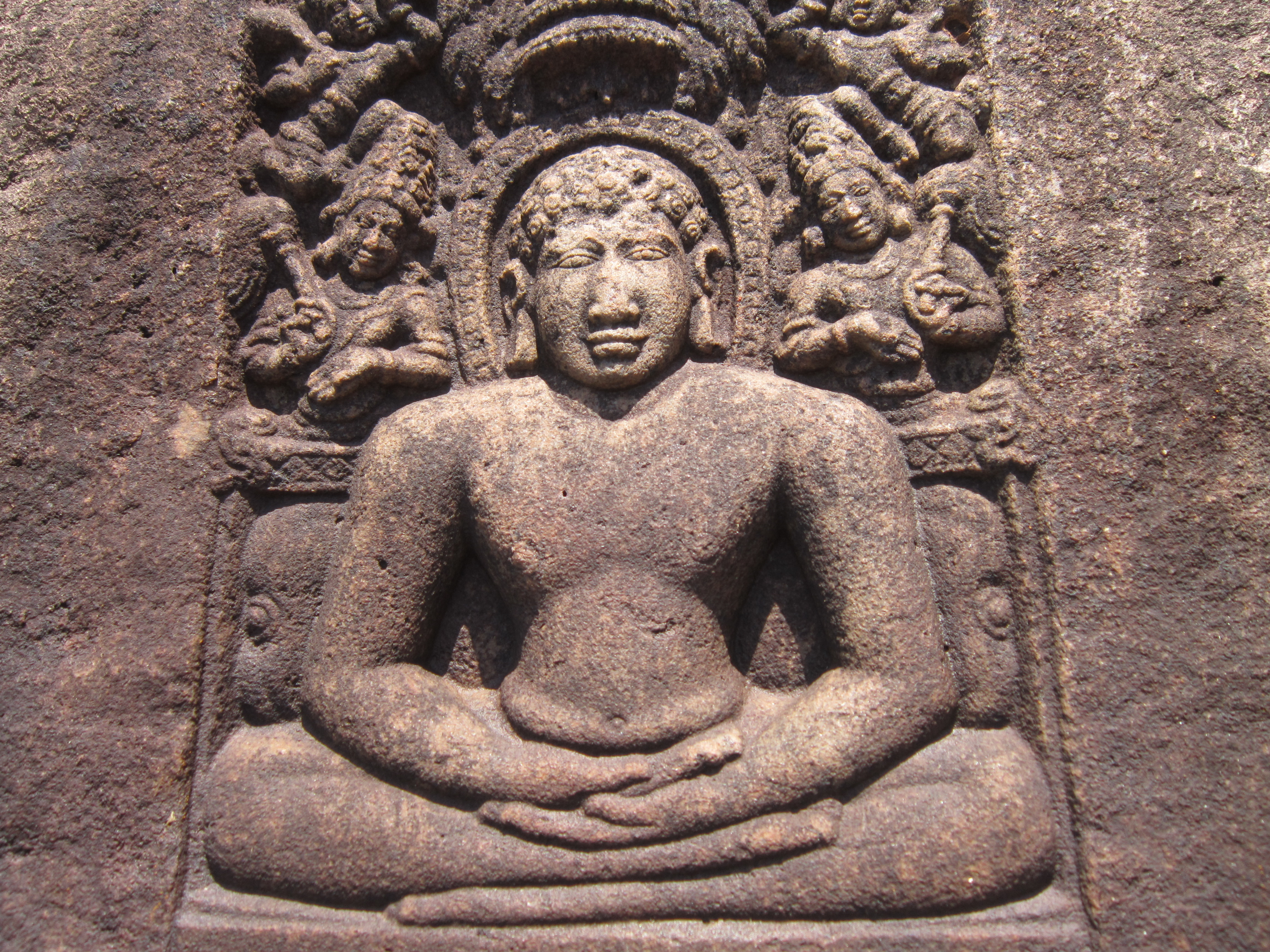
Mahaveer Swami at Kurathimalai, 8th Century AD

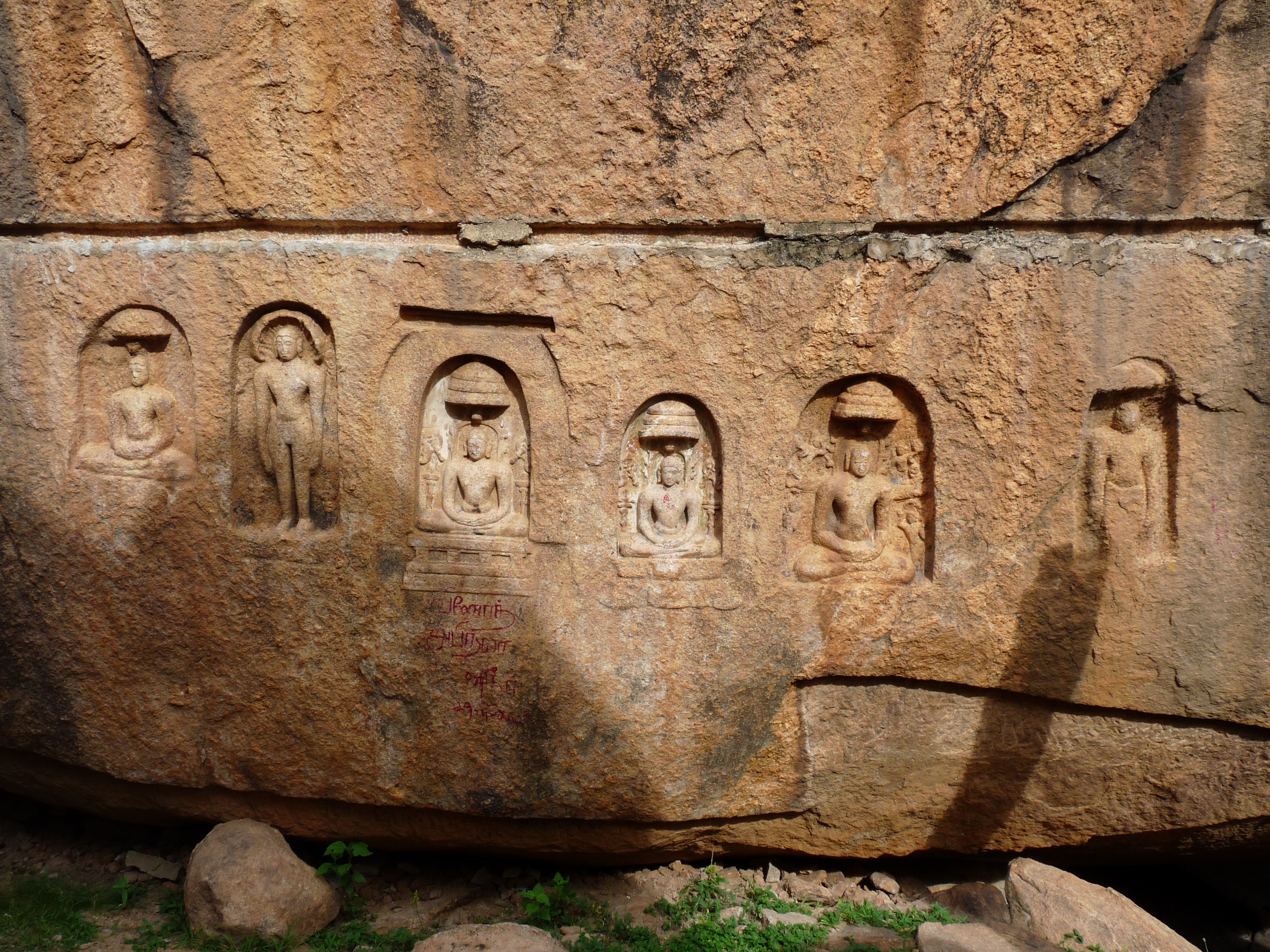
Jain Reliefs at Panchapandava Bed, Kizhavalavu, 9th Century

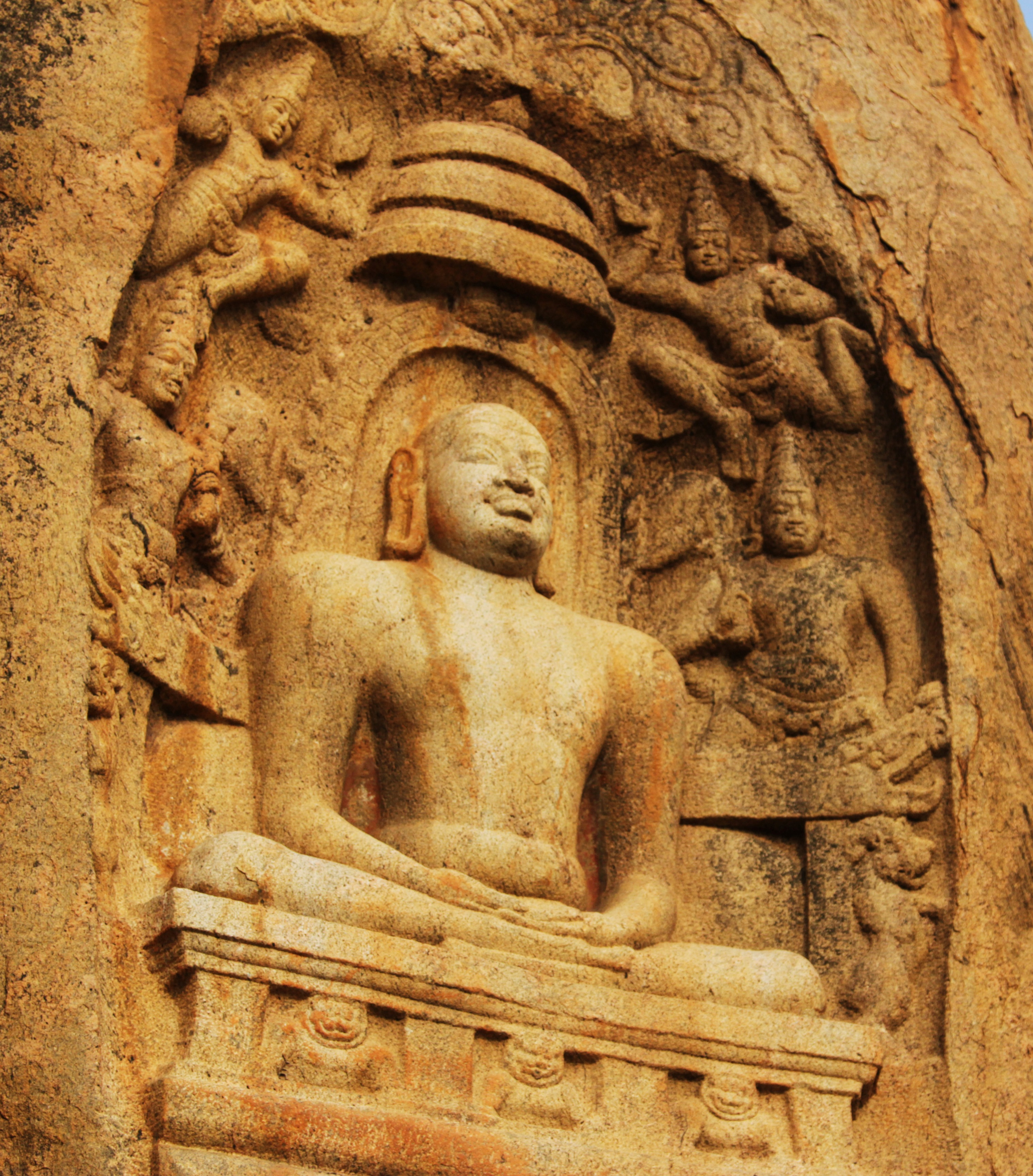
Image of Mahavira at Samanar Hills, 9th century

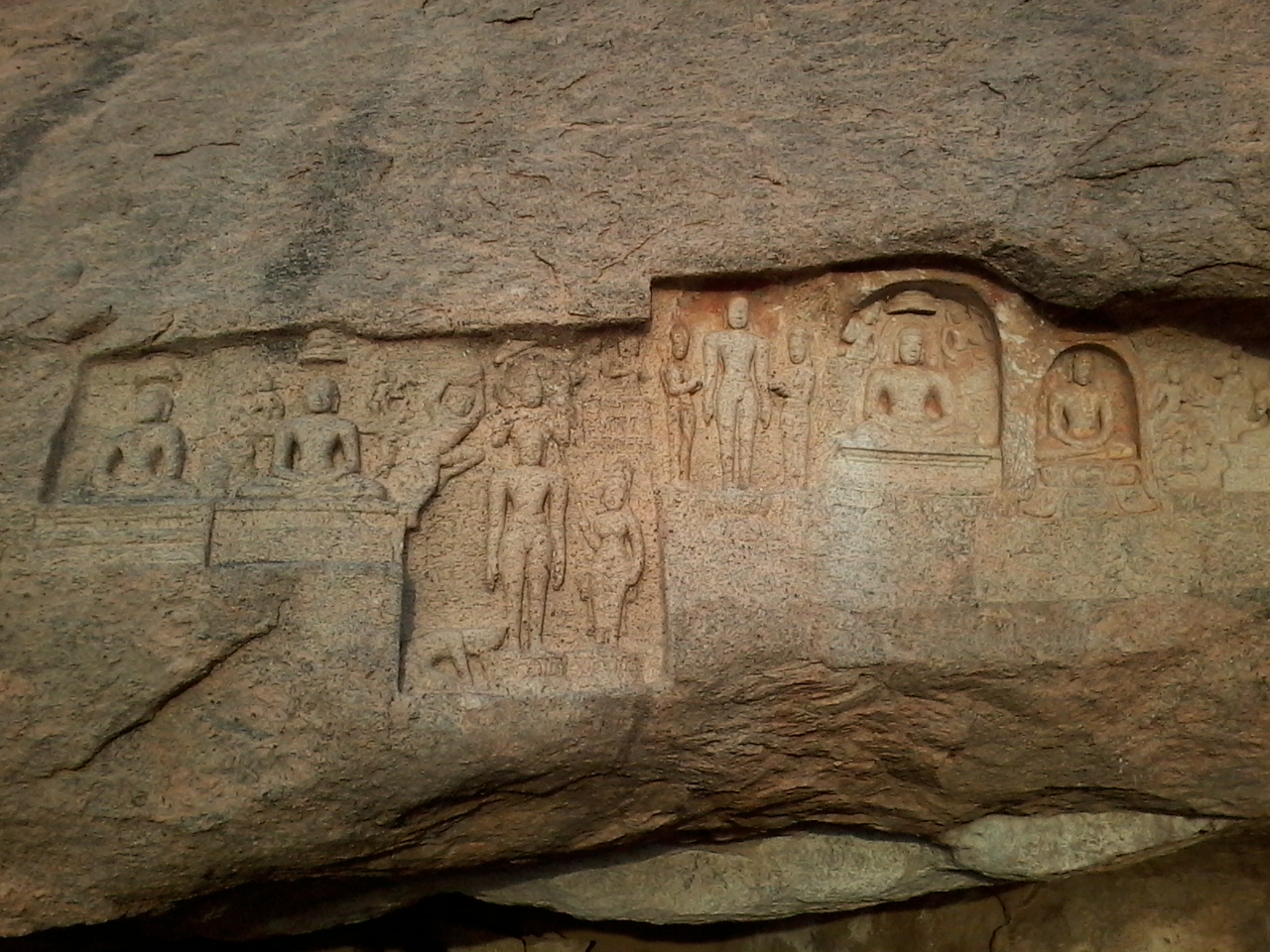
Jain Sculptures at Othakakai

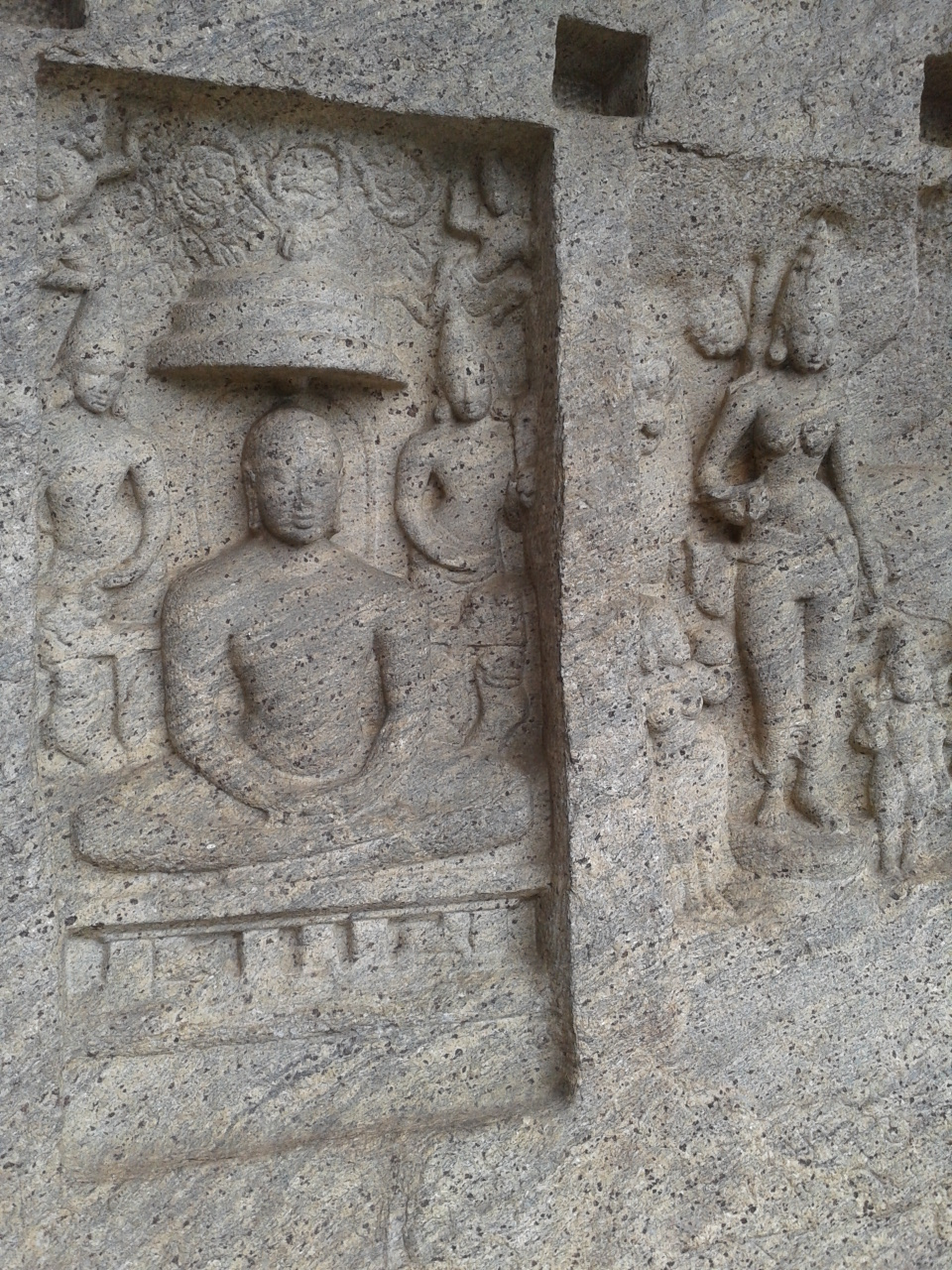
Chitharal malaikovil, before 425 AD

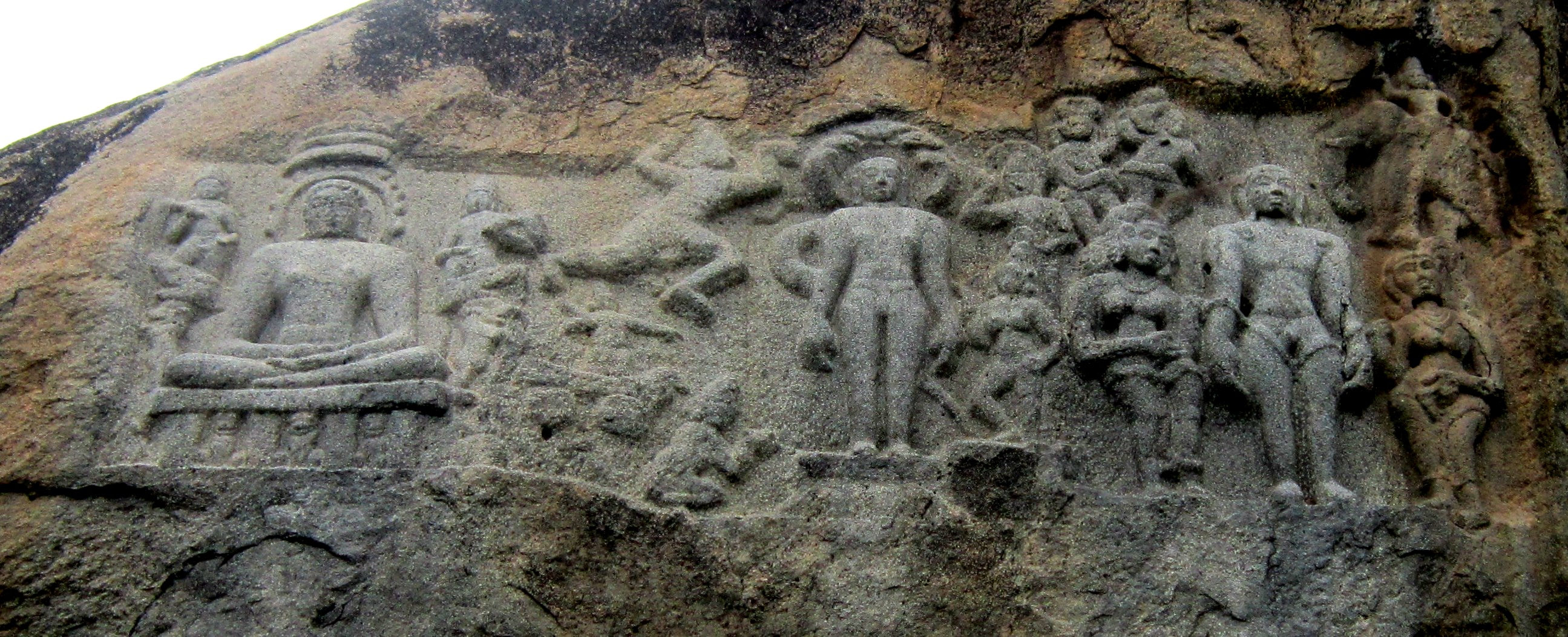
Seeyamangalam temple, 9th century

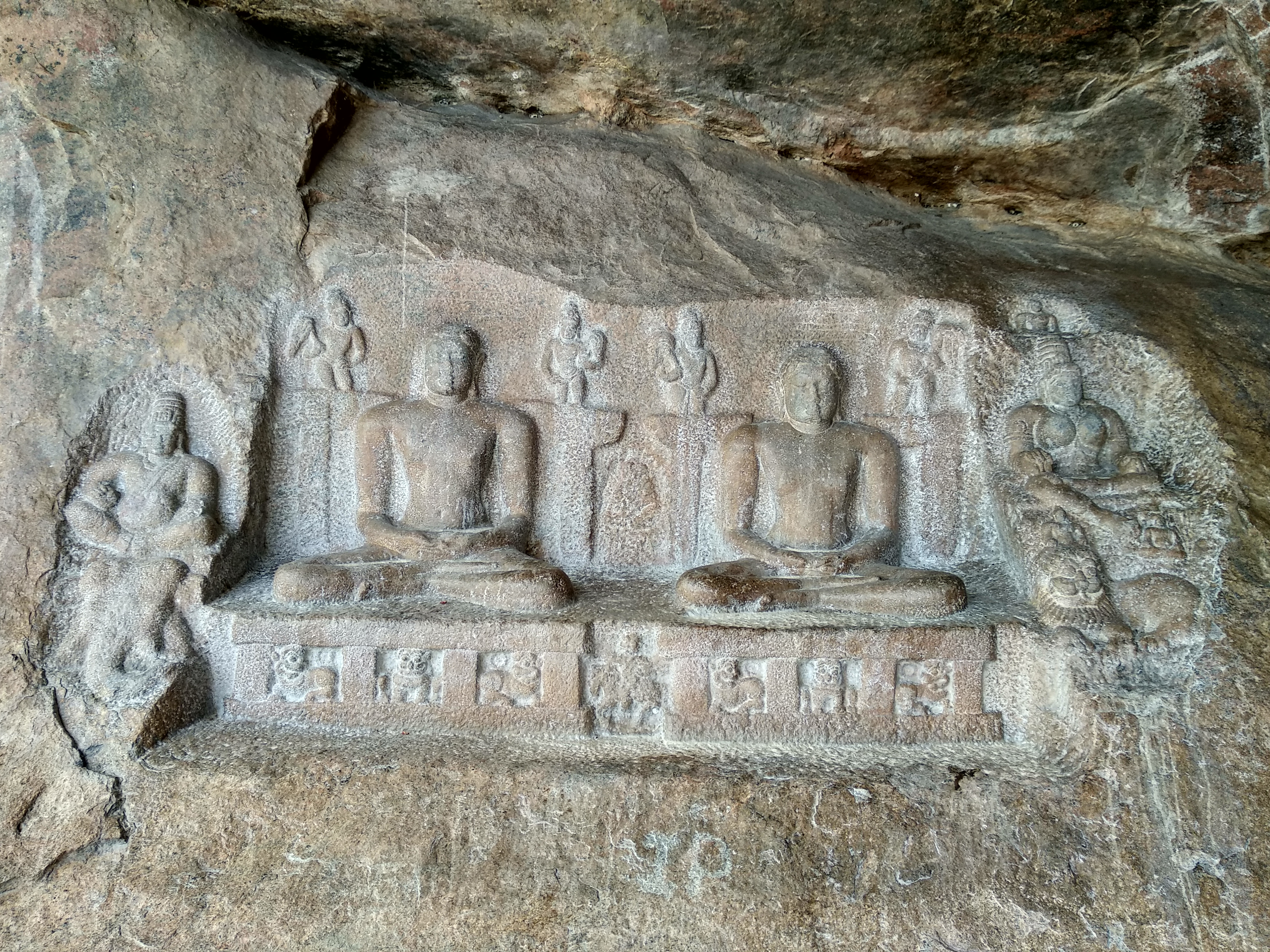
Tirthankar and Ambika, Vallimalai Jain caves, 9th century

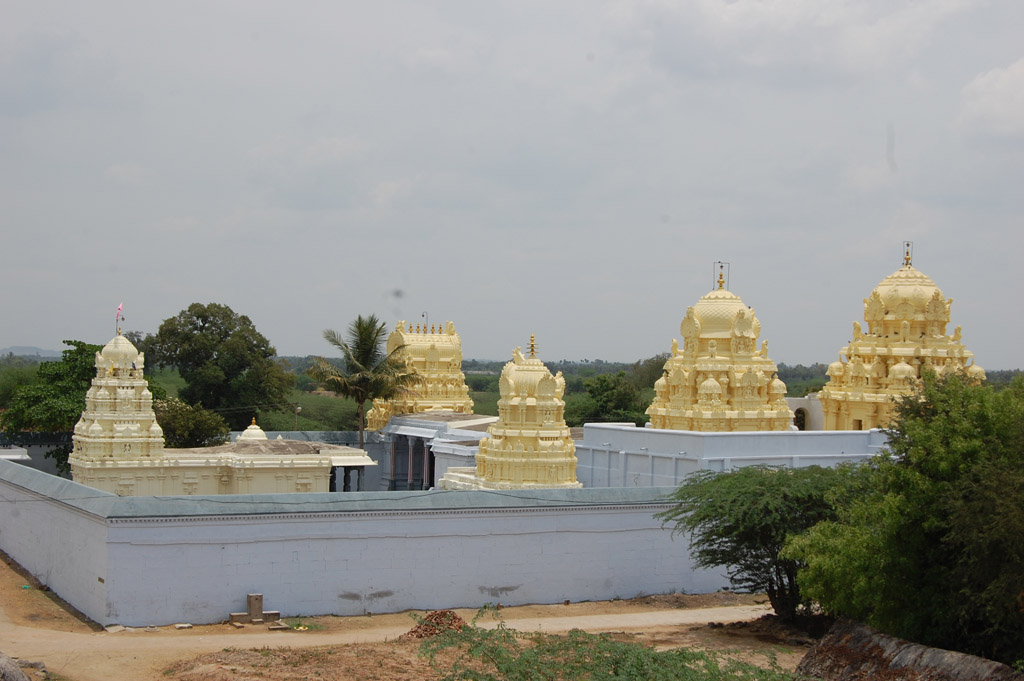
Karanthai Jain temple

== Temples ==
- Mel Sithamur Jain Math
- Mannargudi Mallinatha Swamy Temple
- Arahanthgiri Jain Math
- Trilokyanatha Temple
- Vijayamangalam Jain temple
- Alagramam Jain Temple
- Karanthai Jain Temple
- Chitharal Malai Kovil
- Poondi Arugar Temple
- Adisvaraswamy Jain Temple, Thanjavur
- Chandraprabha Jain Temple, Kumbakonam
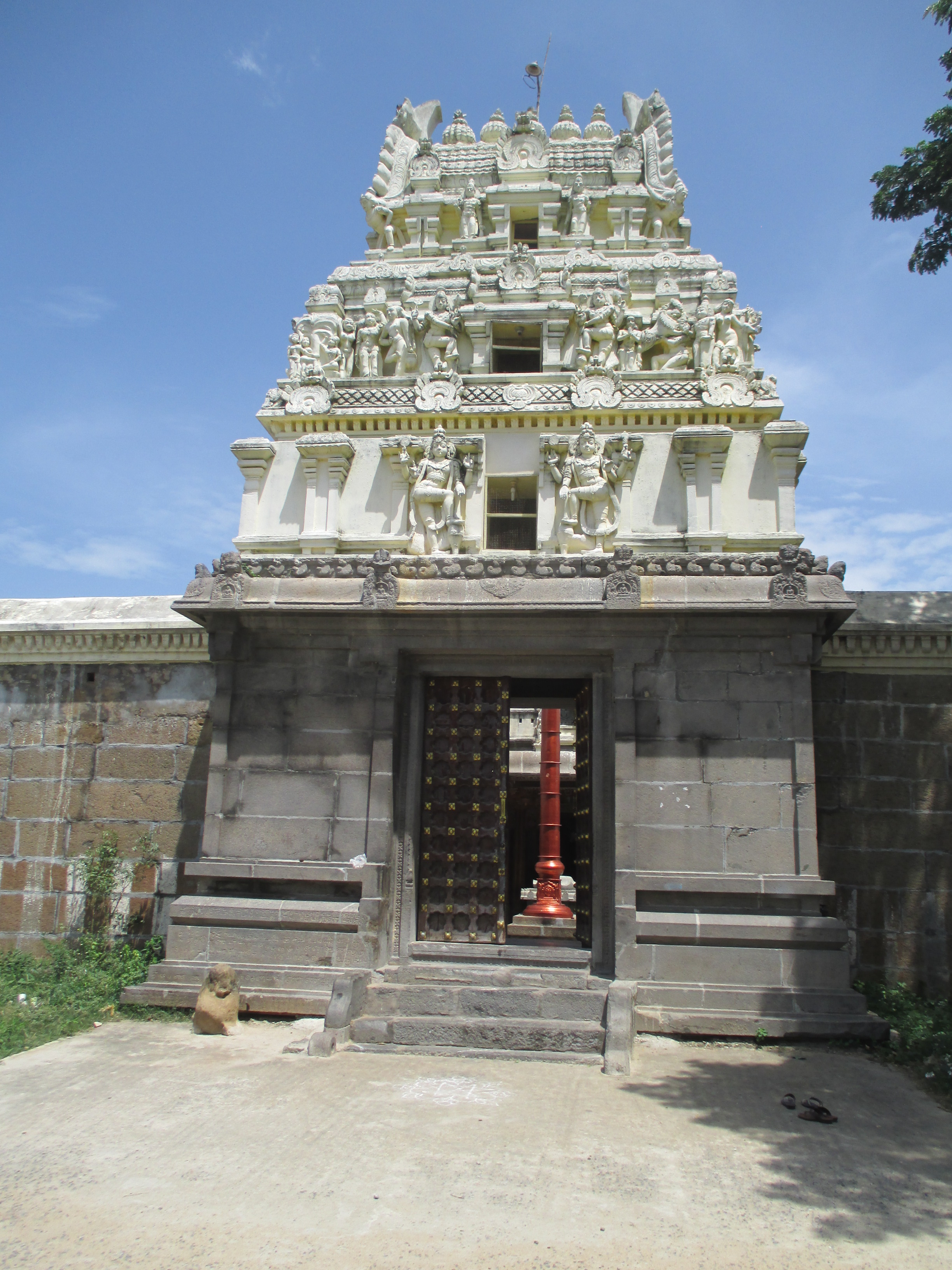
Trilokyanatha Temple, Kanchipuram

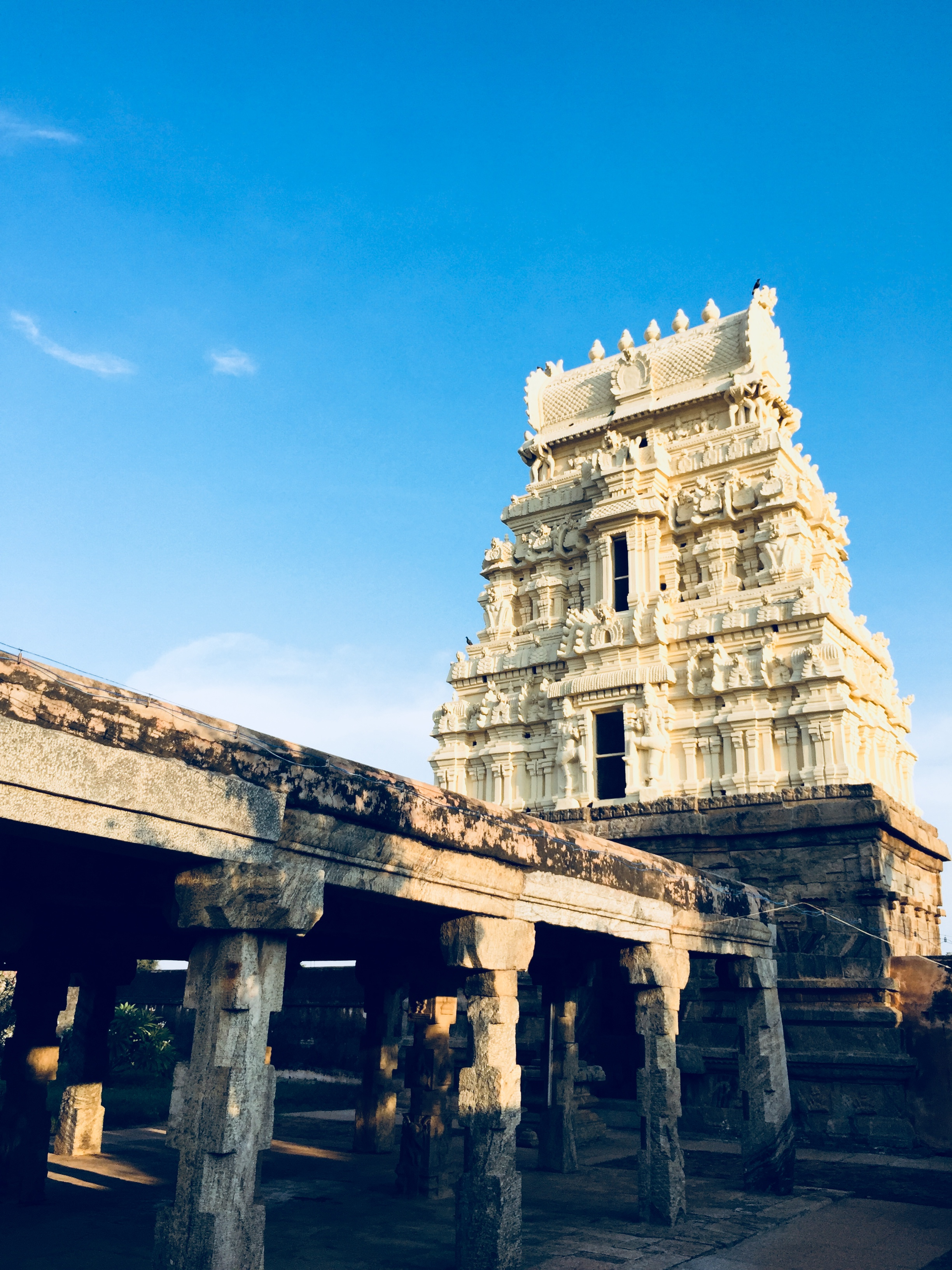
Vijayamangalam Jain temple

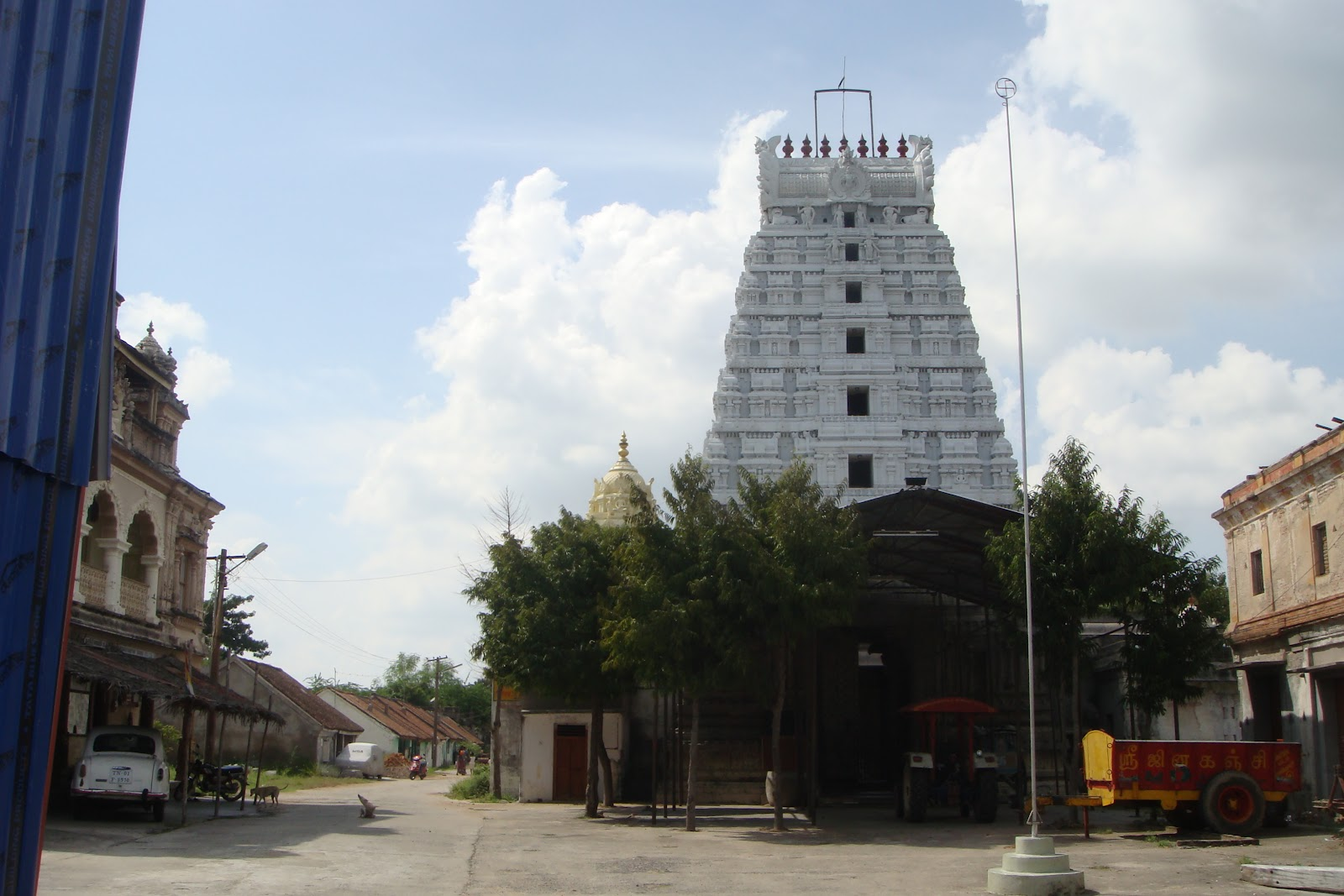
Mel Sithamur Jain Math headed by Bhattaraka Laxmisena

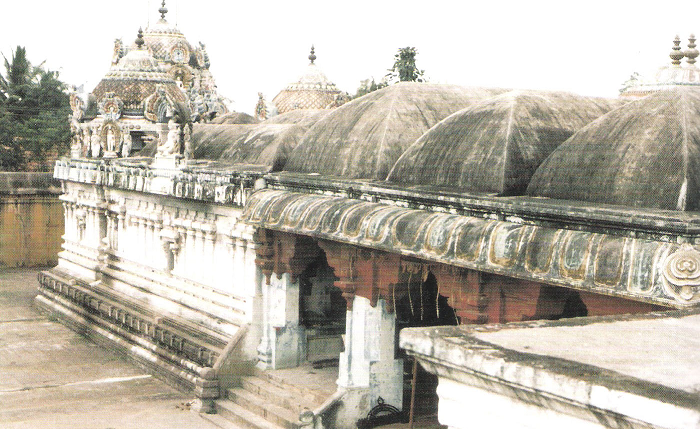
Mannargudi Mallinatha Swamy Temple

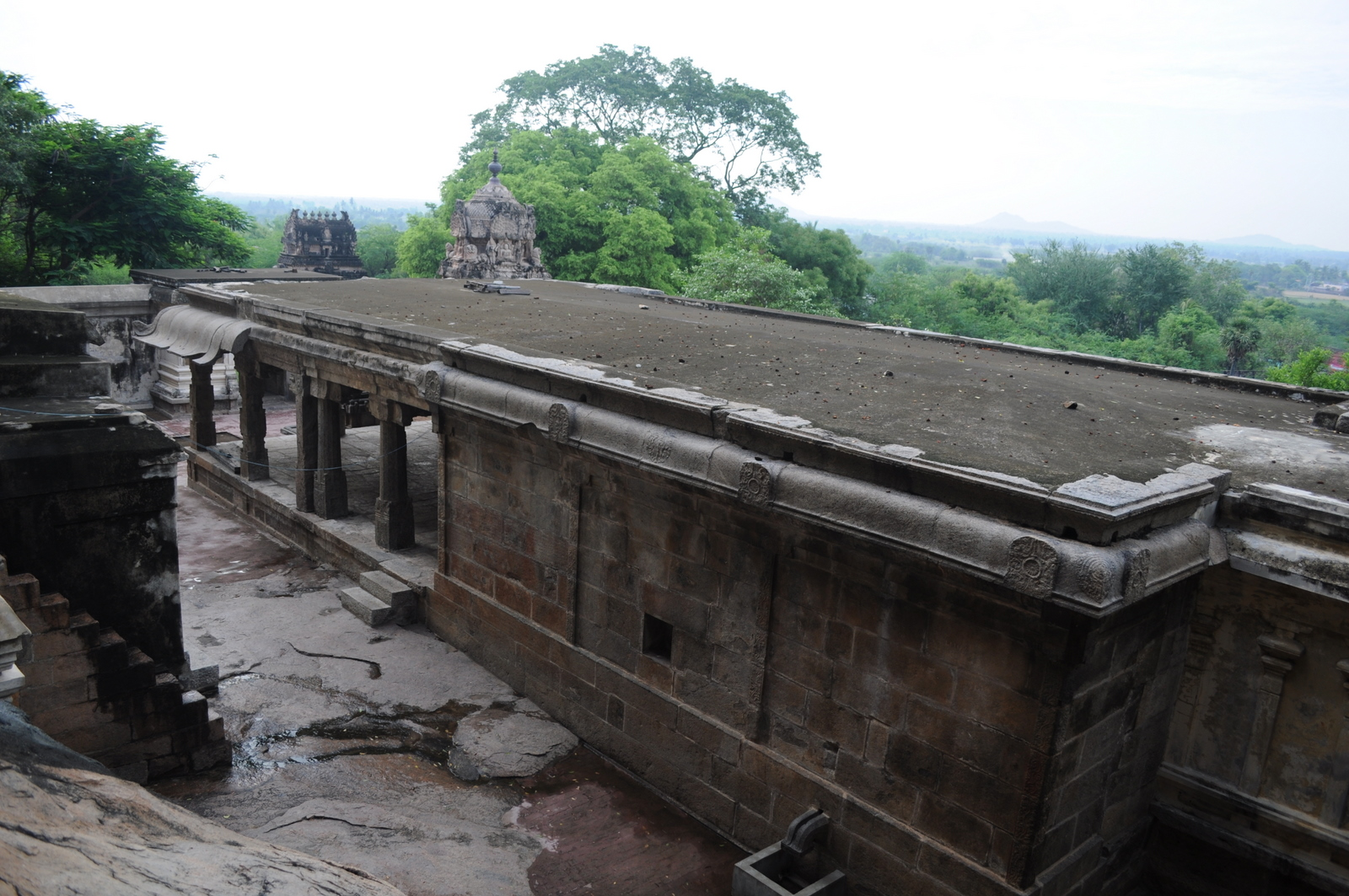
Arahanthgiri Jain Math

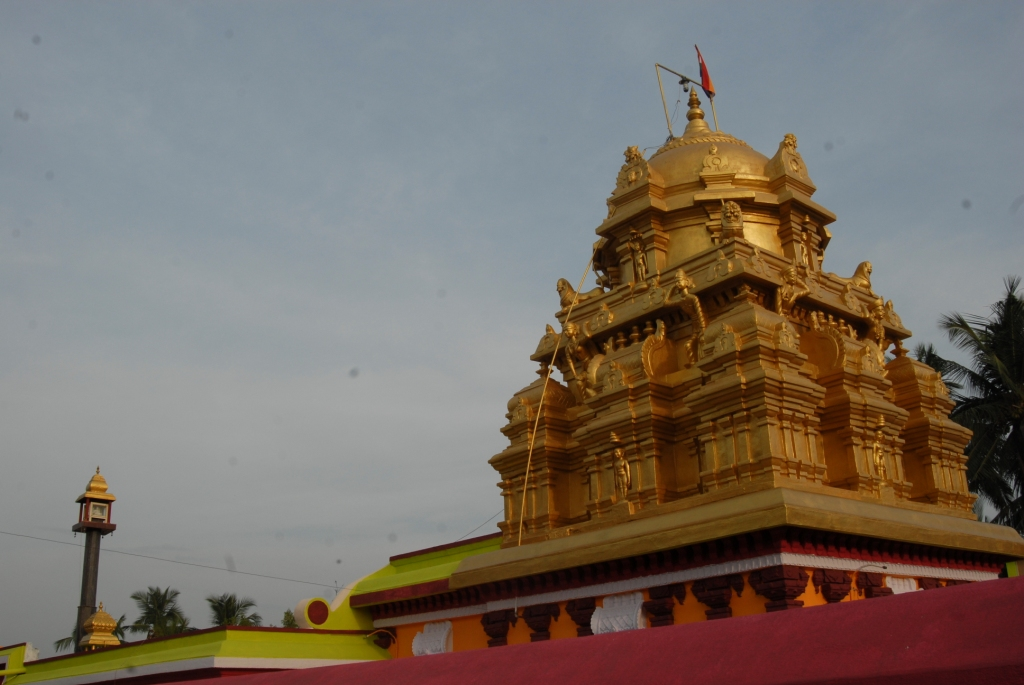
Shri Adinatheeswarar Jain Temple, Desur

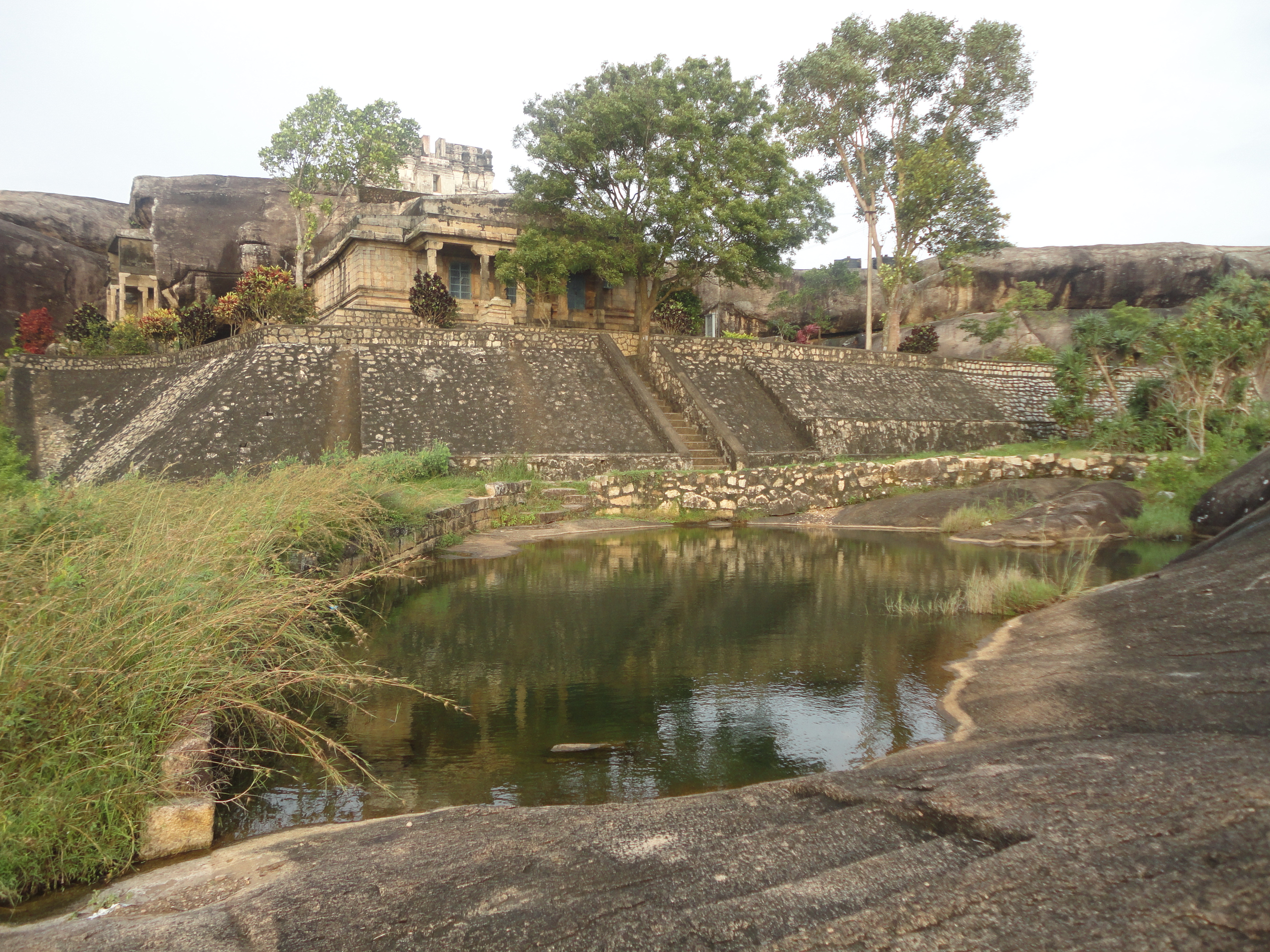
Chitharal Jain Temple

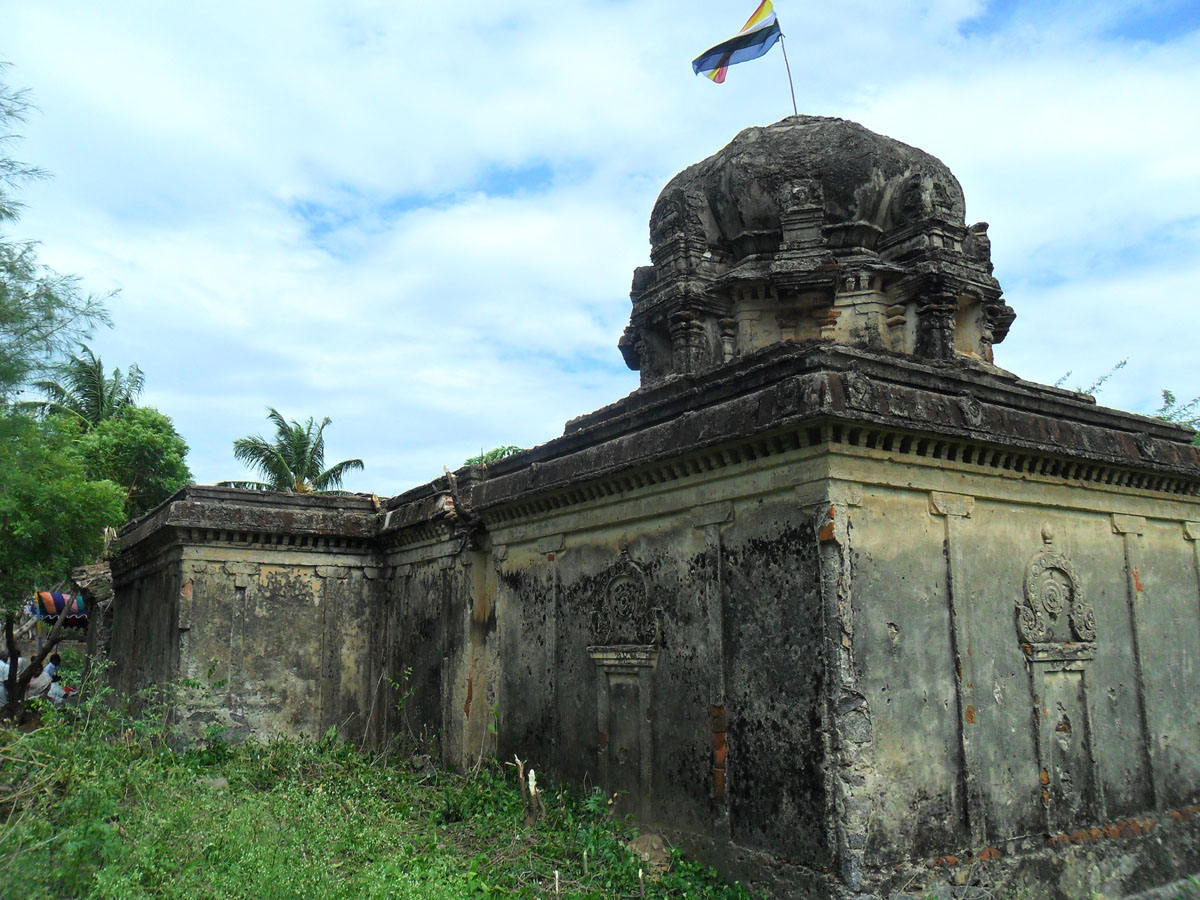
Gingee Jain temple, Villupuram district

== See also ==
- Religion in Tamil Nadu
- Tamil Jain
- Kalugumalai Jain Beds
- Thirakoil
- Kanchiyur Jain cave and stone beds
