= Deepanayakaswamy Jain Temple =

Jain Temple in Tiruvarur district, Tamil Nadu, India

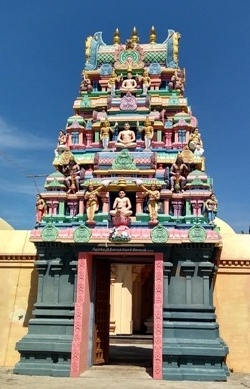
- Deepanayakaswamy Jain Temple

- Deepanayakaswamy Jain Temple, Deepangudi, Tiruvarur district, Tamil Nadu

Religion
- Affiliation: Jainism
- Deity: Rishabhanatha
- Festival: Mahavir Jayanti

Location
- Location: Deepangudi, Arasavanangadu, Tiruvarur
- Interactive map of Deepanayakaswamy Jain Temple
- Coordinates: 10.8296°N 79.5582°E

Deepanayakaswamy Jain Temple is a Jain temple dedicated to the deity Jain, located near Arasavanangadu in Kumbakonam-Tiruvarur road in Tiruvarur District, Tamil Nadu, India.

== Structure of the temple ==
The temple has sanctum sanctorum, Rajagopura, artha mandapa, front mandapa.maha mandapa and vimana. The gopura has three tiers, with the stucco figures of Tirttankaras. In the Vimana, Upapeeta, Peeta, Kumudha, Patti and Prastara are found. At the entrance of the artha mandapa, guardian deities are found on either side. Near to them bronze sculpture of Tirttankara is found. In the entrance of the Mahamandapa also guardian deities are found. On the right side of the mandapa Sruthaskanda, Sasanadeva, Sasanadevi, Kshetrabalar and Tirttankara are found. Shrimes of Dharmadevi, Adhinatha, Jwalamalini and Brahmadevar are also found. Near the Rajagopura, Mutt is found.

== Presiding deity ==
The presiding deity is known as Deepanayakaswamy and Deepanathar. As the presiding deity is called as Deepanayakaswamy the place was to be known as Deepankudi.

== Inscription ==
During renovation of the Kailasanatha Temple near the Jain Temple an inscription of Rajendra Chola II was found, in September 2009. It notes about the donation offered. In the first part of the inscription one Nandhian has been referred. This Nandhian belonged to Jainism.

== See also ==
- Jainism in Tamil Nadu
- Tamil Jain
