= Deepangudi =

Neighbourhood in Tiruvarur district, Tamil Nadu,, India

- Village
- Location in Tamil Nadu, India
- Coordinates: 10.8289°N 79.5789°E
- Country: India
- State: Tamil Nadu
- District: Tiruvarur
- Elevation: 38.62 m (126.7 ft)

Population (2001)
  - Total: 1,202

Languages
  - Official: Tamil
- Time zone: UTC+5:30 (IST)

Deepangudi is a village in the Kudavasal taluk of Tiruvarur district in Tamil Nadu, India.

== Demographics ==
As per the 2001 census, Deepankudi had a population of 1,202 with 598 males and 604 females. The sex ratio was 1010. The literacy rate was 65.61.
