= Sripal =

Sripal or Shripal is a male given name from Sanskrit and may refer to:

- Shripal Morakhia, Indian film director and producer
- Sripal Silva, Sri Lankan cricketer
- Sripal Singh Yadav, Indian politician
- S. Sripal, Indian police commissioner

== See also ==
- Sri (disambiguation)
- Pal (disambiguation)
