= Mandalapuruder =

Personal life
- Born: 16th century
- Died: 16th century

Religious life
- Religion: Jainism

Mandalapuruder (c. 16th century) was a Jain ascetic and lexicographer.

== See also ==
- Tamil Jains
