= Tamil Jains =

Tamils who practice Jainism

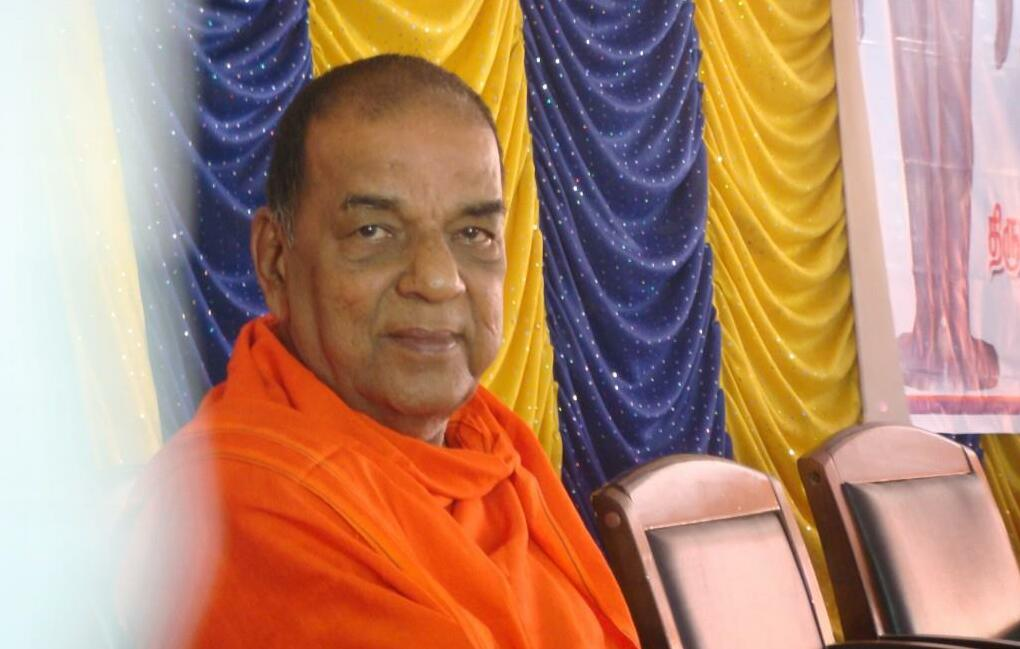
- Bhattaraka Swami Laxmisena, Mel Sithamur

Total population
- 83,359

Religions
- Jainism

Languages
- Tamil

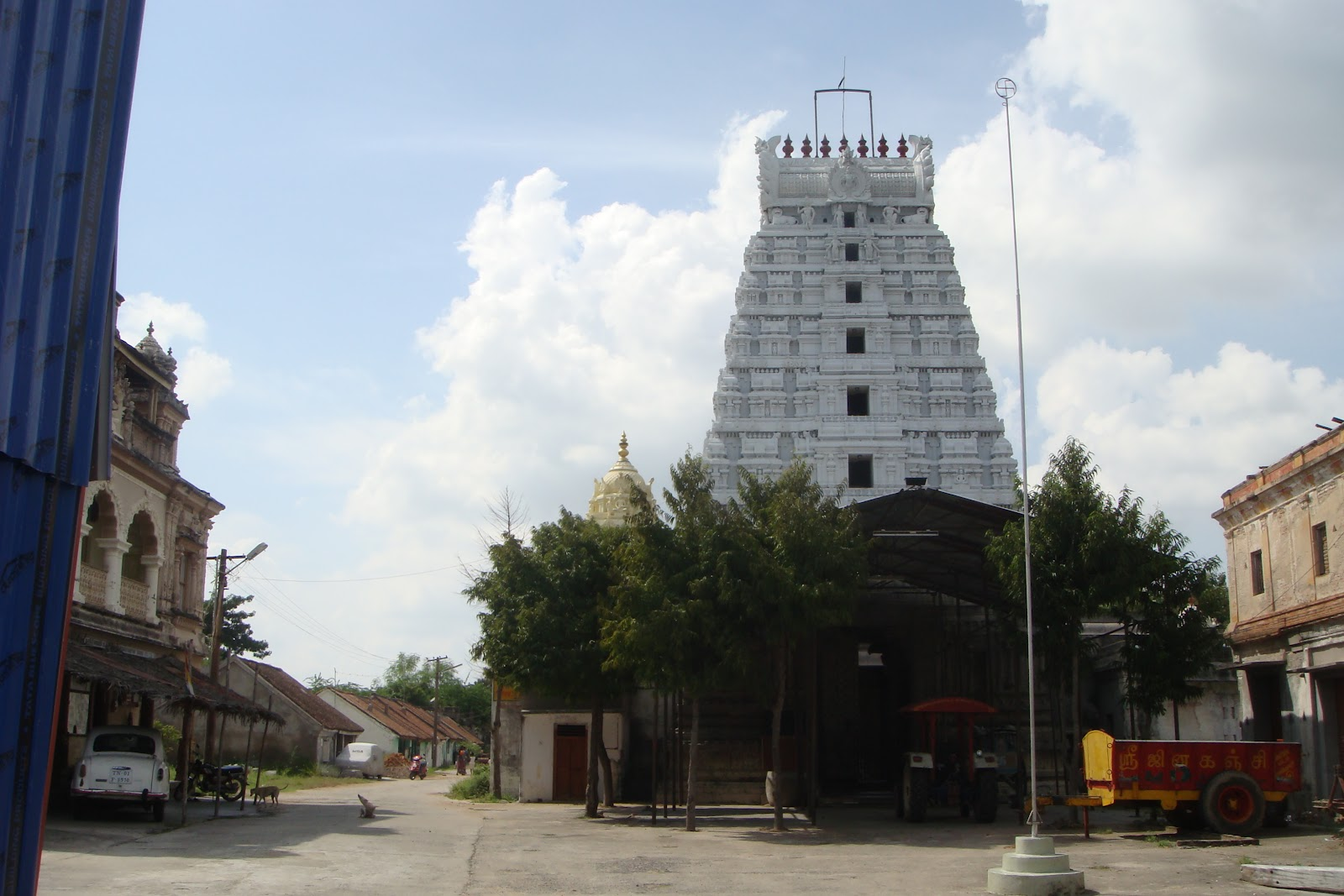
Mel Sithamur Jain Math, the residence of Laxmisena.

Tamil Jains (Tamil Samaṇar, from Prakrit samaṇa "wandering renunciate") are ethnic-Tamils and migrants from other states such as Gujarat and Rajasthan in the Indian state of Tamil Nadu, who practice Jainism (Samaṇam in Tamil). The Tamil Jain is a microcommunity of around 85,000 (around 0.13% of the population of Tamil Nadu). They are predominantly scattered in northern Tamil Nadu, largely in the districts of Tiruvannamalai, Kanchipuram, Vellore, Villupuram, Ranipet and Kallakurichi.

Early Tamil-Brahmi inscriptions in Tamil Nadu date to the third century BCE and describe the livelihoods of Tamil Jains. Samaṇar wrote much Tamil literature, including the important Sangam literature, such as the Nālaṭiyār, the Cilappatikaram, the Valayapathi and the Civaka Cintamani. Three of the five great epics of Tamil literature are attributed to Jains.

== History ==
=== Origins ===
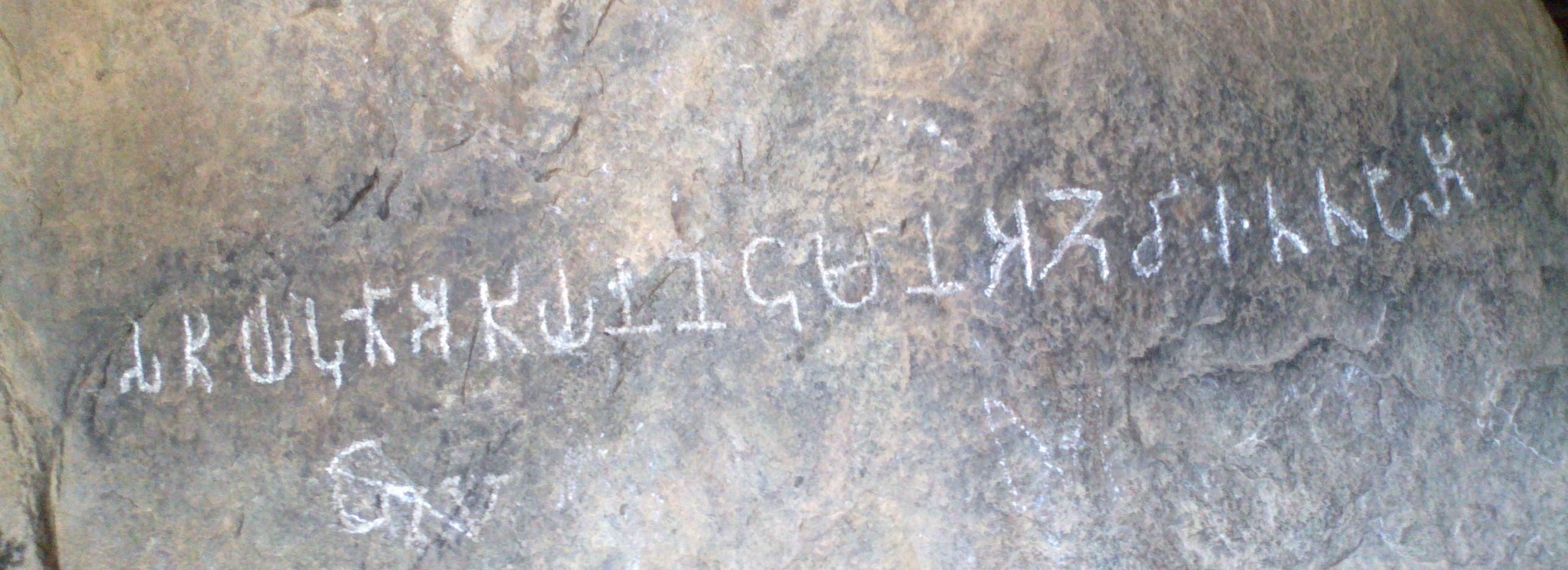
Jambai Tamil Brahmi inscription near Jain Rock Beds.

Some scholars believe that Jain philosophy must have entered South India some time in the sixth century BCE.

According to other scholars, Jainism must have existed in South India well before the era of Jain tirthankara Lord Mahaveer Swami. There are plenty of caves as old as fourth century with Jain inscriptions and Jain deities found around Madurai, Tiruchirāppaḷḷi, Kanyakumari and Thanjavur.

A number of Tamil-Brahmi inscriptions have been found in Tamil Nadu that date from the second century BCE. They are regarded as associated with Jain monks and lay devotees.

The exact origins of Jainism in Tamil Nadu is unclear. However, Jainism flourished in Tamil Nadu at least as early as the Sangam period. Tamil Jain tradition places their origins are much earlier. The Ramayana mentions that Rama paid homage to Jain monks living in South India on his way to Sri Lanka. Some scholars believe that the author of the oldest extant work of literature in Tamil (3rd century BCE), Tolkāppiyam, was a Jain Shraman.

Tirukkural by Thiruvalluvar is considered by many to be the work of a Jain by scholars like V. Kalyanasundarnar, Vaiyapuri Pillai, Swaminatha Iyer, and P. S. Sundaram. It emphatically supports strict vegetarianism (or veganism) (Chapter 26) and states that giving up animal sacrifice is worth more than thousand burnt offerings (verse 259).

Silappatikaram, the earliest surviving epic in Tamil literature, was written by a Samaṇa, Ilango Adigal. This epic is a major work in Tamil literature, describing the historical events of its time and also of then-prevailing religions, Jainism, Buddhism and Shaivism. The main characters of this work, Kannagi and Kovalan, who have a divine status among some Tamils, Malayalees and Sinhalese were Jains.

According to George L. Hart, who holds the endowed chair in Tamil Studies by University of California, Berkeley, has written that the legend of the Tamil Sangams or "literary assemblies", was based on the Jain sangham at Madurai:

There was a permanent Jain assembly called a Sangha established about 604 CE in Madurai. It seems likely that this assembly was the model upon which tradition fabricated the Sangam legend.

Jainism became dominant in Tamil Nadu in the fifth and sixth century CE, during a period known as the Kalabhra interregnum.

=== Decline and survival ===
Jainism began to decline around the eighth century CE, with many Tamil kings embracing Hindu religions, especially Shaivism. Still, the Chalukya, Pallava and Pandya dynasties embraced Jainism. The Shaivite legend about the impalement of the Jains in Madurai claims that 8000 Jains were impaled after they lost a contest against the Saivites, Thirugnana Sambandhar was invited by the queen of Madurai to check the atrocities against Jains and their influence on the King; however, this legend is not mentioned in any Jain text According to Paul Dundas, the story represents the abandonment of Madurai by Jains for various reasons or the gradual loss of their political influence.

Jainism survived in the region during the period of decline. The Melsithamur matha was established by a monk Shantisager who arrived from Shravanabelgola sometime during the 9-12th century period as attested by the 12th century inscriptions. A Jain center associated by Acharya Akalanka in the eighth century survives at Thiruparuttikundram near Kanchi. The Tamil Jain texts of this period include 13th-century (orlater) Aruṅkalacceppu, 14th cent. Mērumantarapūrāṇam and the 15th-century Śrīpurāṇam.

=== Revival ===
When India became independent in 1947, Madras Presidency became Madras State, comprising present day Tamil Nadu, coastal Andhra Pradesh, South Canara district Karnataka, and parts of Kerala. The state was subsequently split up along linguistic lines. In 1969, Madras State was renamed Tamil Nadu, meaning Tamil country.

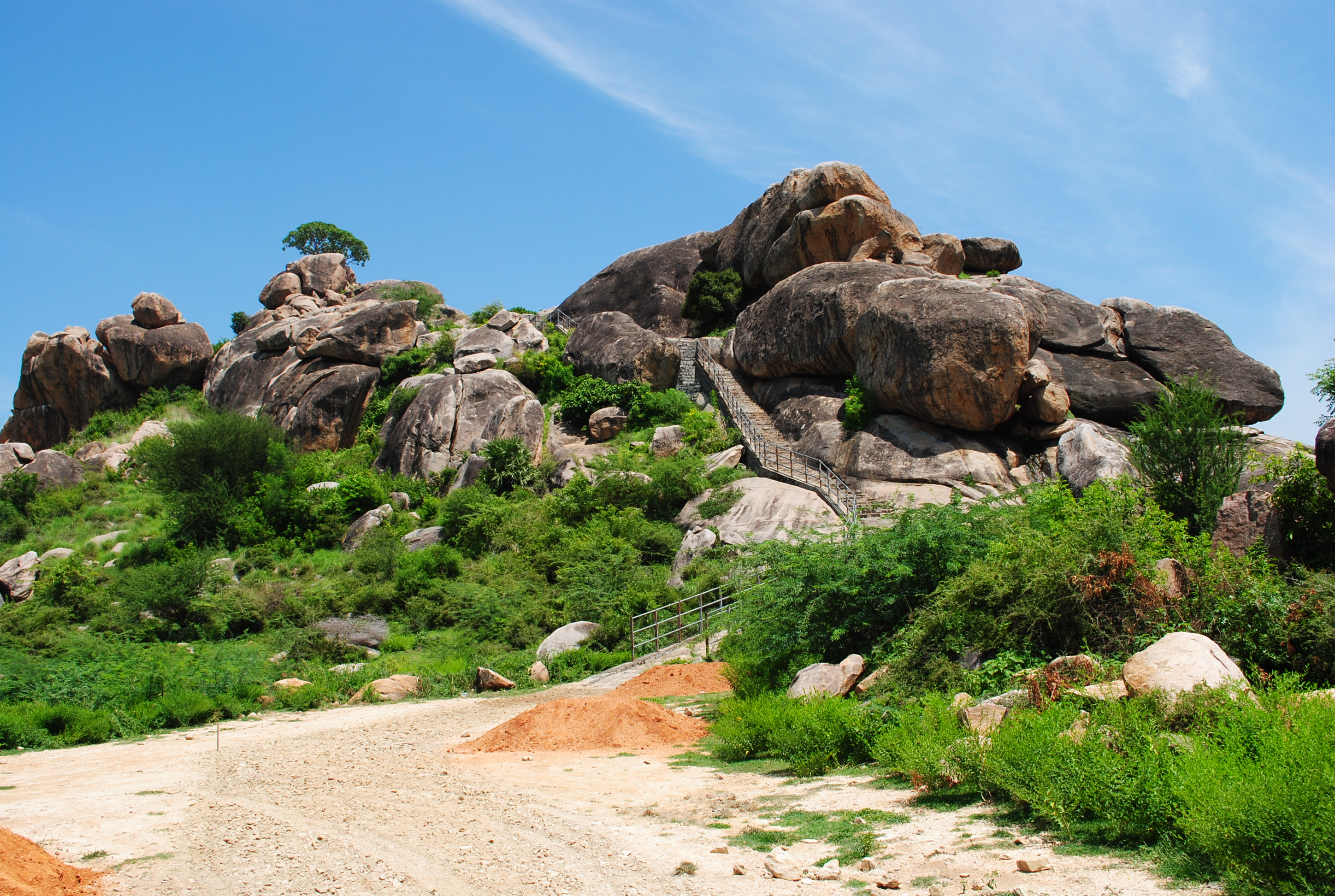
Tirumalai Jain temple hill.

Acharya Nirmal Sagar was the first Digambar Jain monk to reenter Tamilnadu in 1975 after a gap of several centuries. After him some of the Jain nuns have visited Tamilnadu resulting in a renaissance of Jainism among the Tamil Jains. Many abandoned and crumbling temples have been renovated as a result of renewed interaction between Tamil Jains and the Jains from the rest of India. Financial grants have been provided by Bharatiya Digambar Jain Tirth Samrakshini Mahasabha and the Dharmasthala institutions. Local Jain scholars and activists have started "Ahimsa walks" to bring attention to the Tamil Jain heritage.

=== Archaeological evidences ===
Archaeological remains in Tamilnadu are discovered time to time that attest to popularity of Jainism in Tamilnadu. Most of the rock inscriptions are related to the Jain ascetics who used to commonly reside in hill caves. The ruins of Anandamangalam vestiges were discovered in Anandamangalam, a small hamlet near Orathi village in Kancheepuram district of Tamil Nadu. The ruins had the rock-cut sculptures of yakshini (tutelary deity) Ambika and tirthankara Neminatha and Parshvanatha.

== Population ==
The total number of Jains in Tamil Nadu as per 2011 Indian census is 83,359, which forms 0.12% of the total population of Tamil Nadu (72,138,958). This include the Jains who have migrated from North India (mainly Rajasthan and Gujarat). The population of Tamil Jains is estimated to be 25,000-35,000.

Jains in Tamil Nadu
Parameter	Population	Male	Female
Total Population	83,359	43,114	40,245
Literates Population	68,587	36,752	31,835
Workers Population	26,943	23,839	3,104
Cultivators Population	2,216	1,675	541
Agricultural Workers Population	768	325	443
HH Industry Workers Population	574	441	133
Other Workers Population	23,385	21,398	1,987
Non-Workers Population	56,416	19,275	37,141

The Tamil Jains are ancient natives of Tamil Nadu and belong to the Digambara sect. They generally use the title Nainar. A few in Thanjavur District, use Mudaliar and Chettiar as titles. The former North Arcot and South Arcot (now Tiruvannamalai, Vellore, Cuddalore and Villupuram Districts) districts have a large number of Jain temples, as well as a significant population of Tamil Jains.

The title Nainar has been used since antiquity for Jain monks. In Cilappatikaram a Jain temple is mentioned as Nayinar Koil and the Kalugumalai inscription refers to Jain munis as Nayinar. It is akin to the term Sahu or Sadhu in North Indian Jain inscriptions.

== Religious head ==
=== Laxmisena ===
Laxmisena of the Jina Kanchi Jain Mutt or madam at Mel-Sithamoor (near Tindivanam, Villupuram District) is one of the religious heads of the community. He performs the upadesha ceremony for Jain children. In the past, this mutt had been the centre for religious study, guiding and helping the economic activities of its members, organising religious discourses, maintenance of temples and such activities. The mutt was able to achieve such multifarious operations with the help and contributions of its members. At present the mutt is also maintaining a gousala (for cows and others).

The present finance position of the mutt is inadequate for even day-to-day maintenance. Planting of coconut and mango trees has been started to increase the revenue of the fund for the purpose of day-to-day maintenance of the mutt. The car ('ther') in the mutt requires replacement of wooden wheels.

=== Dhavalakeerthi ===
In addition to the above, a new mutt named Arahanthgiri Jain Math located at Thirumalai near Polur, Tiruvannamalai district, has been functioning from 8 February 1998 with the name Dhavalakeerthi. Now in the mutt around 2300 students are studying from primary to higher secondary school including Jain philosophy with free boarding and lodging. Maintenance of the above is done through contributions from donors.

== Lifestyle ==
The traditional occupation of the majority of the Tamil Jain families has been landowners of agricultural land. Now many are teachers. A considerable number of them are settled in urban areas, they are employed in public and private sectors. A small population has settled overseas (US, Canada, UK, Australia and other places).

=== Cuisine ===
Tamil Jains are ardent vegetarians. With the turn of the 20th century, they were a self-sustained rural-based farming community. They were landowners and used contract labourers for their agricultural activities. Their household included large tracts of land, cattle, and milch cows. They had kitchen gardens growing vegetables for their daily need. Dairy food such as milk, curd, butter and ghee were cooked in house. Daily food was very simple consisting of a brunch with rice, cooked lentils (paruppu), ghee, vegetable sambar, curd, sun-dried pickles of mango, lemon or citron, and deep-fried sun-dried 'crispies' (vadavam) made from rice pie. Evening snacks of deep-fried lentil preparations and before sunset dinner consisting either idli, dosa or rice with buttermilk and lentil chutney (thogaiyal). While seniors, people undergoing religious fast and ardent followers of religious principles avoided garlic, onions and tubers in their daily food, these were occasionally used by others in the household.

=== Identity ===
Tamil Jains are well assimilated in Tamil society, without any outward differentiation. Their physical features are similar to Tamils. Apart from certain religious adherences, practices and vegetarianism, their culture is similar to the rest of Tamil Nadu. However, they name their children by the names of Tirthankaras and characters from Jain literature. It is also notable that the men of the Tamil Jain community also wear the sacred thread.

=== Lifetime ceremony ===
Ezhankaapu - on the seventh day of its birth, a new born baby is adorned with bracelets.

Kaathu Kutthal - ear piercing and adorning child with earrings. This ceremony is mostly performed in either Aarpakkam temple or Thirunarangkondai i.e.Thirunarungkundram. (Appandai Nathar is the deity).

=== Other Ceremonies ===
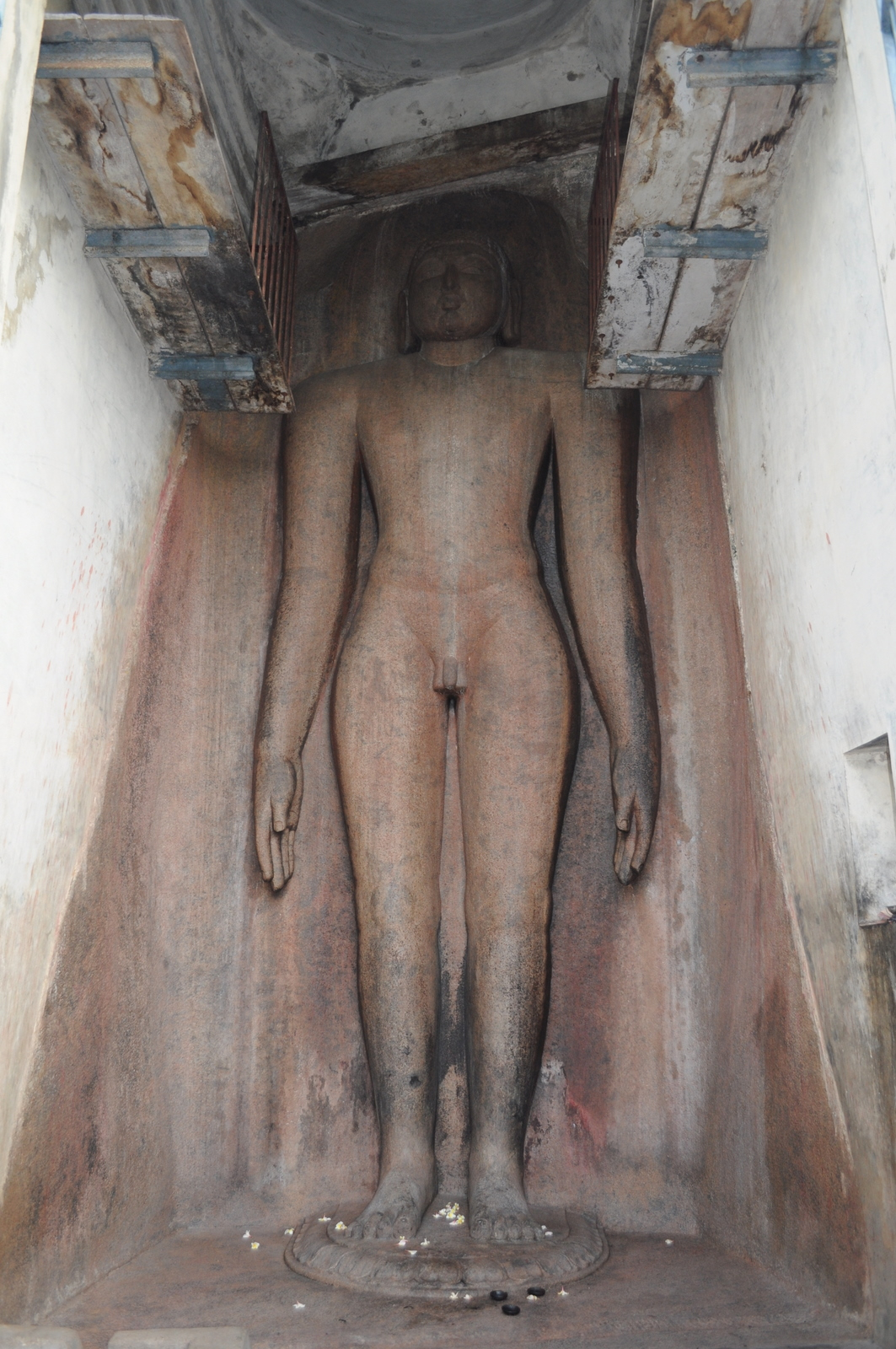
Tirumalai Neminatha Statue.

Upadesam - the formal induction into religious practices and adherences is called Upadesam. This is done to both boys and girls, at around the age of 15. After Upadesam, one is supposed to follow religious practices with vigor and seriousness.

Marriage - outwardly, Jain marriages resemble Hindu marriages. However, the mantras chanted are Jain. There is no Brahmin priest; instead there is a Samaṇar called a Koyil Vaadhiyar or temple priest, who conducts the ceremonies.

Pilgrimage - most Jains go on pilgrimage to tirthas and major Jain temples in North India - Sammed Shikharji, Pavapuri, Champapuri and Urjayanta Giri - as well as places in South India such as Shravanabelagola, Humcha or Hombuja Humbaj, Simmanagadde in Karnataka and Ponnur Malai in Tamil Nadu.

There are private amateur tour operators as well who take pilgrims to newly identified ancient Tamil Jain sites in western Tamil Nadu (Kongunad) and northern Kerala (Wayanad).

Funeral rites - the dead are placed on a pyre and incinerated. Ashes are then disbursed in water courses and ceremonies are performed on 10th or 16th day. Annual remembrance ceremonies similar to Hindu practice are not performed. But no festivities or functions are followed that year on the paternal side.

=== Festivals ===
- Akshaya Tritiya commemorates the first Tirthankara, Rishabha, partaking food after many long years of penance.
- Jinaratri commemorates Rishabha's moksha.
- Mahavir Janma Kalyanak celebrates Tirthankara Mahavira's birth.
- Diwali commemorates Mahavira's moksha.
- Vasant Panchami honors the Jain Agamas
- Upaakarma commemorates the Chakravartin Bharata, son of Rishabha, acknowledging the true scholars by awarding them the Upanayana.
- Karthikai Deepam at the onset of the month of Kartika
- Puthandu and Thai Pongal are the other common festivals celebrated along with other Tamils.

=== Religious practices ===
Full moon days, Chaturdasi (14th day of the fortnight), Ashtami (8th day of the fortnight) are days chosen for fasting and religious observations. Women take food only after reciting the name of a tirthankara five times. People undertake such practices as a vow for certain period of time - sometimes even for years. On completion, Udhyapana festivals (special prayer services) are performed, religious books and memorabilia are distributed. People who take certain vows eat only after sunrise and before sunset.

== List of Tamil Jains ==
- Thiruvalluvar Jain Saint
- Prof. A. Cakravarti Nayanar, scholar and author, including "Jain Literature in Tamil", 1941,
- Jeevabandhu T.S Sripal
- S. Sripal, Director General of Police in Tamil Nadu.
- Prof. J. Srichandran, Founder, Varthamanan Padippagam
- Air Marshal Simhakutty Varthaman.
- Wing Commander Abhinandan Varthaman.
- DMK MLA, A. Rajendran from Polur.

== Temple locations ==
=== Cave temples ===
- Tirumalai (Jain complex)
- Kalugumalai Jain Beds
- Thirakoil
- Samanar Hills
- Sittanavasal Cave
- Kurathimalai, Onampakkam
- Panchapandavar Malai
- Seeyamangalam
- Kanchiyur Jain cave and stone beds
- Ennayira Malai
- Andimalai Stone beds, Cholapandiyapuram
- Adukkankal, Nehanurpatti

=== Puja temples ===
is done in the following old (built several centuries ago) and new (built in the last 100 years) Tamil Digambara Jain temples
(in alphabetical order):

- Aadhinath Jain Temple, Cuddalore (old)
- Anumanthakudi, Sivagangai dt.(new)
- Adambakkam, Adi Nath Digambar Jain Temple Chennai (New)
- Agalur, Villupuram Dt. (Old)
- Agarakorakottai, Thiruvannamalai Dt. (New)
- Alagramam Jain Temple, Villupuram Dt. (Old)
- Arahanthgiri Jain Math, Thiruvannamalai Dt. (Old)
- Arani (S.V.Nagaram), Thiruvannamalai Dt. (Old)
- Arani (Pudukamur), Thiruvannamalai Dt. (New)
- Arani (Saidapet), Thiruvannamalai Dt. (New)
- Arani (Palayam), Thiruvannamalai Dt. (New)
- Arani (Kosapalayam) Thiruvannamalai Dt. (New)
- Arani (sevoor) Thiruvannamalai
- Arungulam Kanchipuram Dt. (Old)
- Arpaakkam, Kanchipuram Dt. (Old)
- Arugavur, Solai, Thiruvannamalai Dt. (Old)
- Avadi, Chennai Dt.(New)
- Ayalavadi, Thiruvannamalai Dt. (New)
- Chitharal Jain Temple,(Old) : ninth century temple
- Chitharal malaikovil,(Old) : before 425 CE
- Cheyyar, Thiruvannamalai Dt. (New)
- Deepangudi, Nagapattinam Dt. (Old)
- Easaakolathur, Thiruvannamalai Dt. (Old)
- Elangadu, Thiruvannamalai Dt. (Old)
- Eyyil, Villupuram Dt. (Old)
- Erumbur, Thiruvannamalai Dt.(Old)
- George Town, Chennai Dt. (New)
- Gingee, Viluppuram Dt. (Old)
- Ilayangudi, Sivagangai Dt. (New)
- Kannalam, Villupuram Dt. (Old)
- Kallapuliyur, Villupuram Dt. (Old)
- Kallakullathur, Villupuram Dt. {old}
- Karanthai, Kanchipuram Dt. (Old)
- Karanthai Jain Temple, Thanjavur Dt. (Old)
- Kalugumalai Jain Beds Dt. (Old)
- Kanchiyur Jain cave and stone beds Dt. (Old)
- Kattumalaiyanur, Thiruvannamalai Dt. (New)
- Keezh Villivanam, Thiruvannamalai Dt. (Old)
- Keezh Edayalam, Villupuram Dt.
- Kilsathamangalam, Thiruvannamalai Dt. (Old)
- Koliyanur, Villupuram Dt.(Old)
- Kolathur, Chennai Dt. (New)
- Kovilampoondi, Thiruvannamalai Dt (Old)
- Kumbakonam, Thanjavur Dt. (Old)
- Mannargudi Mallinatha Swamy Jain Temple, Nagapattinam Dt. (Old)
- Melapandal, Vellore Dt. (New)
- Melmalaiyanur, Villupuram Dt. (Old)
- Mel Sithamur Jain Math, Villupuram Dt.
- Mettu Street, Kanchipuram (New)
- Mudalur, Thiruvannamalai Dt. (Old)
- Nallavanpalayam, Thiruvannamalai Dt.(New)
- Nallur, Thiruvannamalai Dt. (Old)
- Nanganallur, Chennai Dt. (New)
- Naval, Thiruvannamalai Dt. (Old)
- Nedimolliyanur Villupuram Dt. {old}
- Nelliyankulam, Thiruvannamalai Dt. (Old)
- Othalavaadi, Thiruvannamalai Dt. (New)
- Parshwa Padmavathi Jain Temple, Sundampatti, Orappam Krishnagiri Dt. (Old)
- Pammal, Chennai (New)
- Peranamallur, Thiruvannamalai Dt (Old)
- Perani, Villupuram Dt. (Old)
- Peravoor, Villupuram Dt. (Old)
- Periyakozhappalur, Thiruvannamalai Dt. (Old)
- Perumandur, Villupuram Dt. (Old)
- Perumbogai, Thiruvannamalai Dt. (Old)
- Poondi Arugar Temple, Arani, Tiruvannamalai Dt(Old)
- Ponnur Malai, Thiruvannamalai Dt. (Old)
- Puzhal, Chennai Dt. (New)
- Renderipet, Thiruvannamalai Dt. (New)
- R.Kunnathur, Thiruvannamalai Dt. (New)
- Shri Vasupujya Temple, Sathuvachari, Vellore Dt. (old)
- Sathuvachari, Vellore Dt. (New)
- Sevur, Vellore Dt. (Old)
- Sitharaal, Nagercoil Dt. (Old)
- Sittanavasal, Pudukottai Dt. (Old)
- Sitthamur, Villupuram Dt. (Oldest Jain temple and Jain math)
- Somaasipadi, Thiruvannamalai (New)
- Thellar, thiruvannamalaiDt.
- Thirunarunkundram, Villupuram Dt. (Old)
- Thiruparuthikundram temple, Kanchipuram Dt. (Old)
- Thirupanamoor, Thiruvannamalai Dt. near Kanchipuram
- Thachambadi, Thiruvannamalai Dt. (Old)
- Thatchur, Thiruvannamalai Dt. (Old)
- Thayanur, Villupuram Dt. (Old)
- Thennathur, Thiruvannamalai Dt.(old)
- Thirakoil, Thiruvannamalai Dt. (Old)
- Thirupparankunram, Madurai Dt.(Sangam literature Paripadal 19 step 51)
- Thiruvannamalai, Thiruvannamalai Dt. (New)
- Thondur, Villupuram Dt. (Old)
- Tindivanam, Villupuram Dt (New)
- Tirumalai, Polur Dt.(Old)
- Trilokyanatha Temple, Kanchipuram Dt (Old)
- Valathi / Valathy, Villupuram Dt. (Old)
- Vandavasi, Thiruvannamalai Dt. (Old)
- Valapandal Vellore Dt. (Old)
- Veedur, Villupuram Dt. (Old)
- Veeranamur, Villupuram Dt. (Old)
- Vellimedupettai, Villupuram Dt. (Old)
- Vempoondi, Villupuram Dt. (Old)
- Venbakkam, Kanchipuram Dt. (Old)
- Vilangadupakkam, Chennai Dt. (Old)
- Vizhukkam, Villupuram Dt. (Old)
- Vijayamangalam, Erode Dt. (Old)
- Virudur, Thiruvannamalai Dt. (Old)
- Nasiyan Jain Temple, Prithvi Raj Road, Ooty, dedicated to Rishabhdevji.
- Sri 1008 Vaupujya Swamy Swethambar Jain Temple, Ooty

== Photo gallery ==
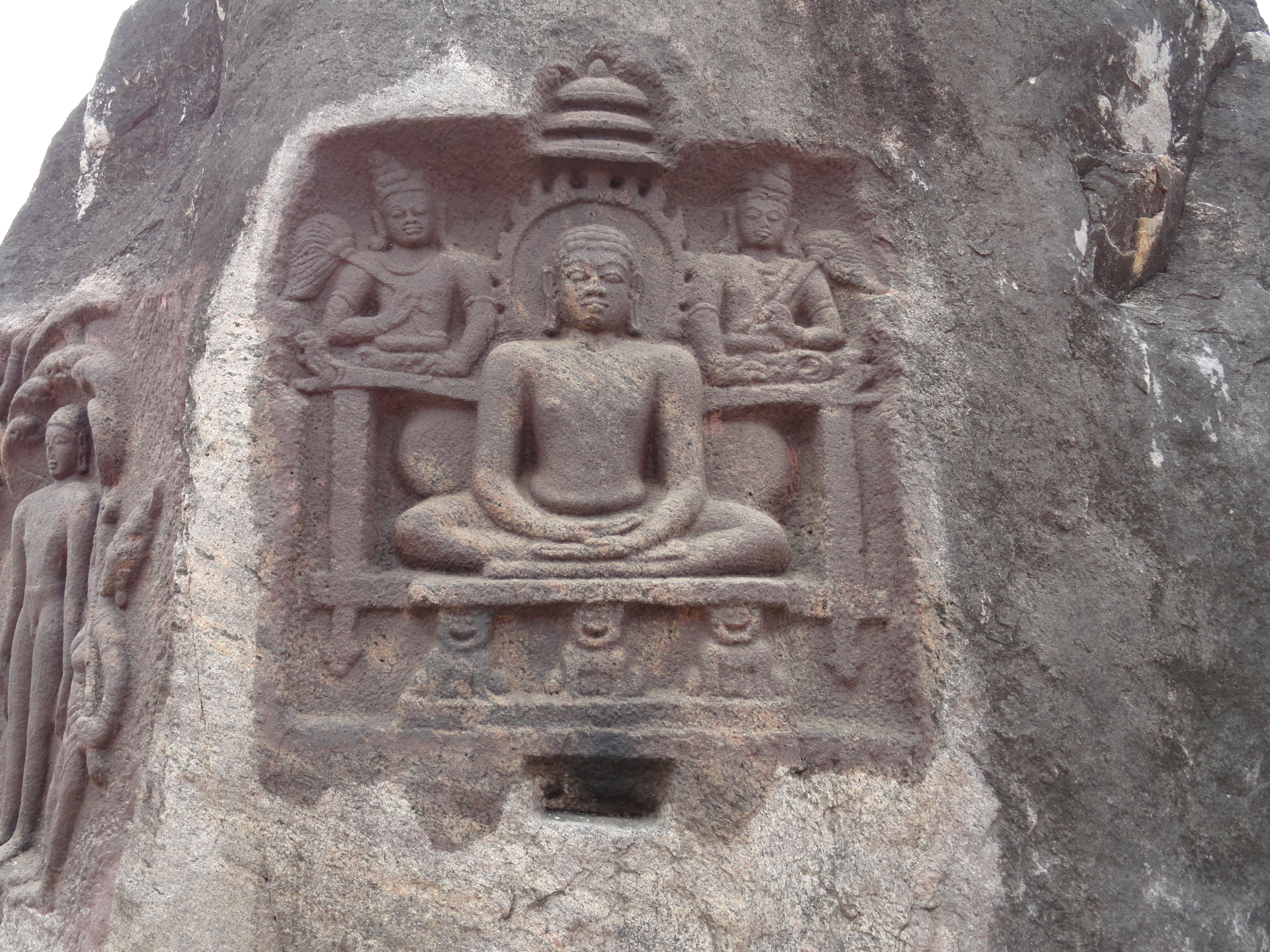
Thirakoil Hill and the Digambara Jain Temple.

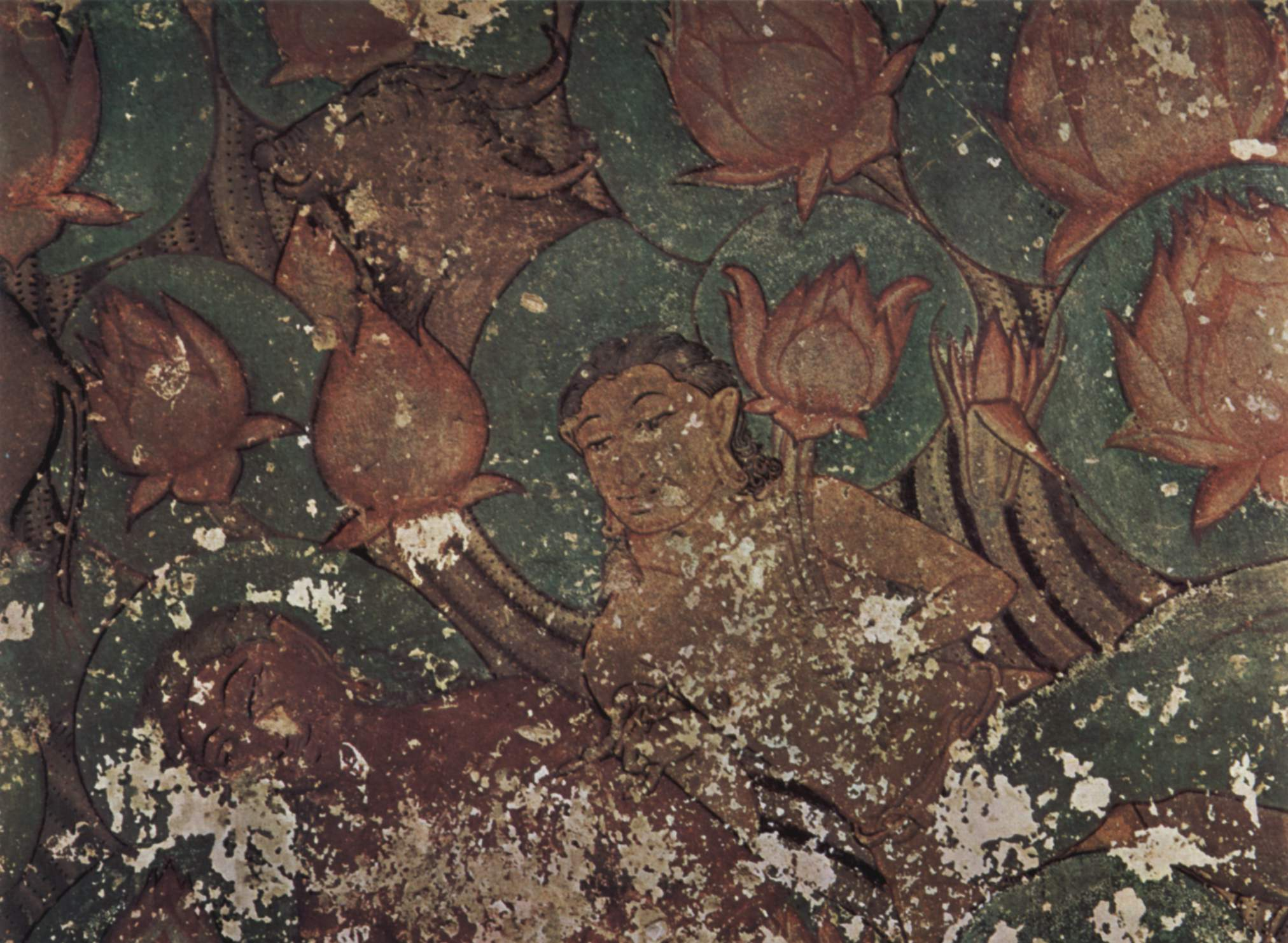
Sittanavasal.

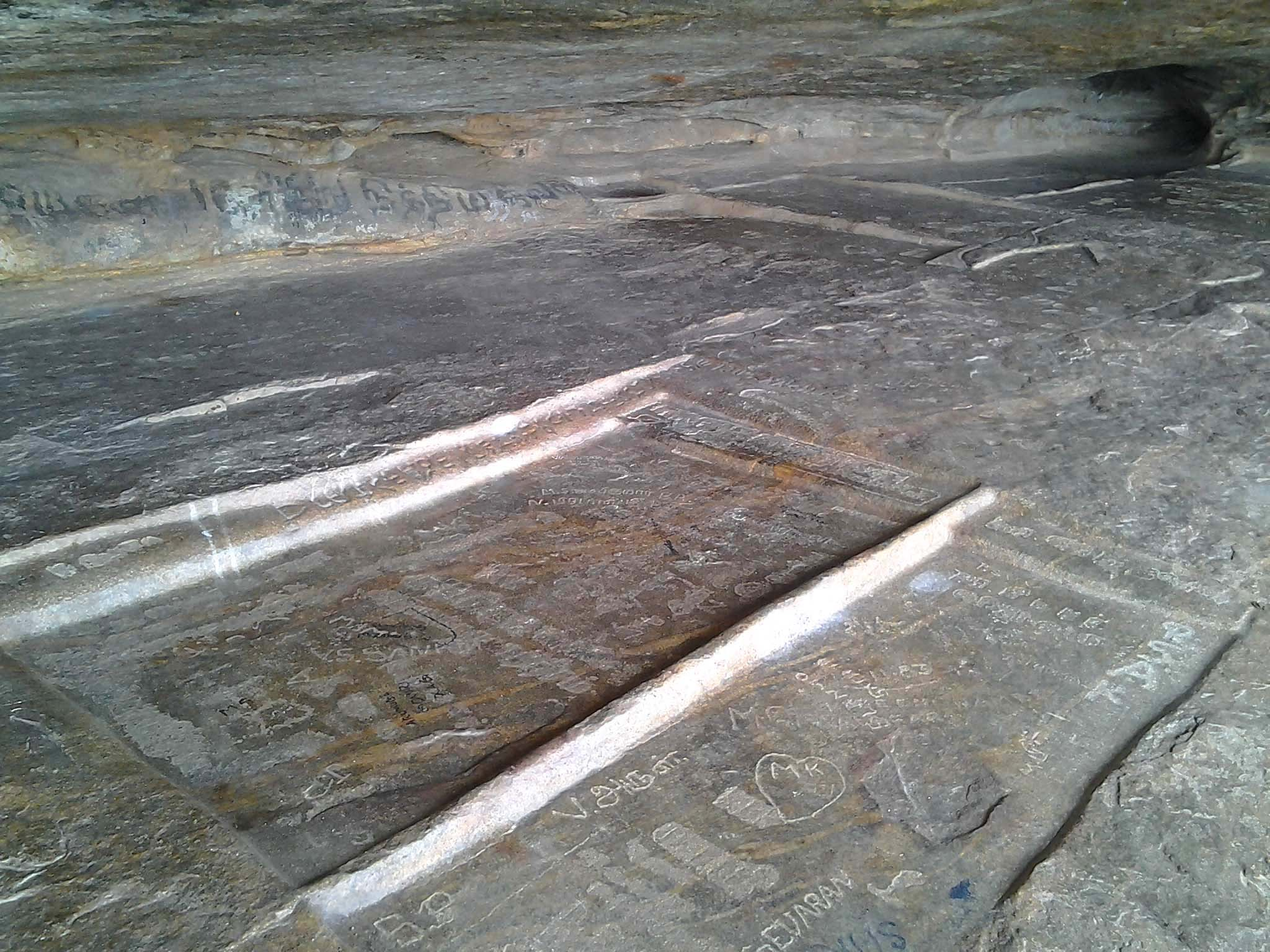
Samanar Padukkai in Sittanavasal

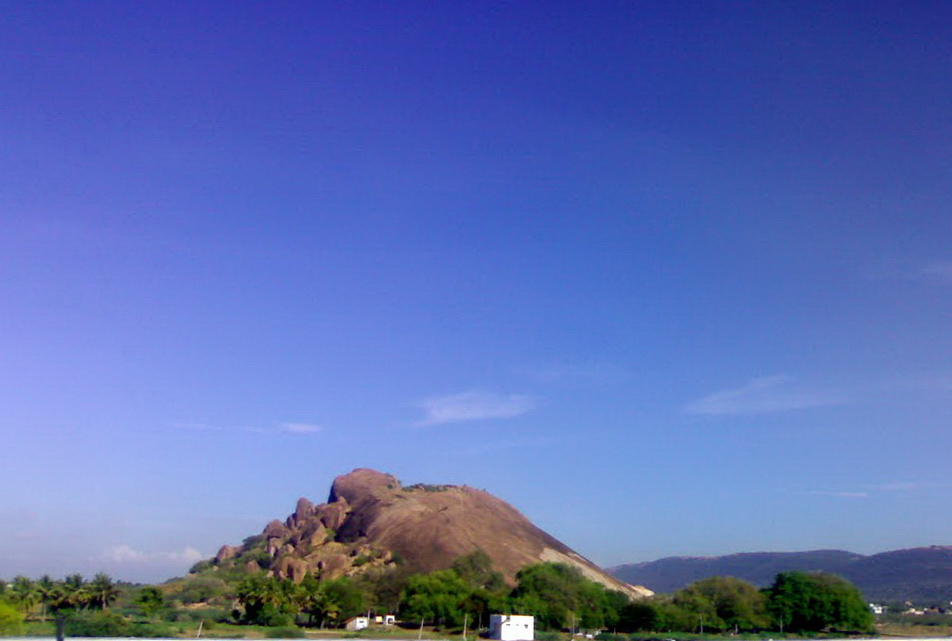
Samanar Malai near Madurai, where the eighth century Jain caves still exist.

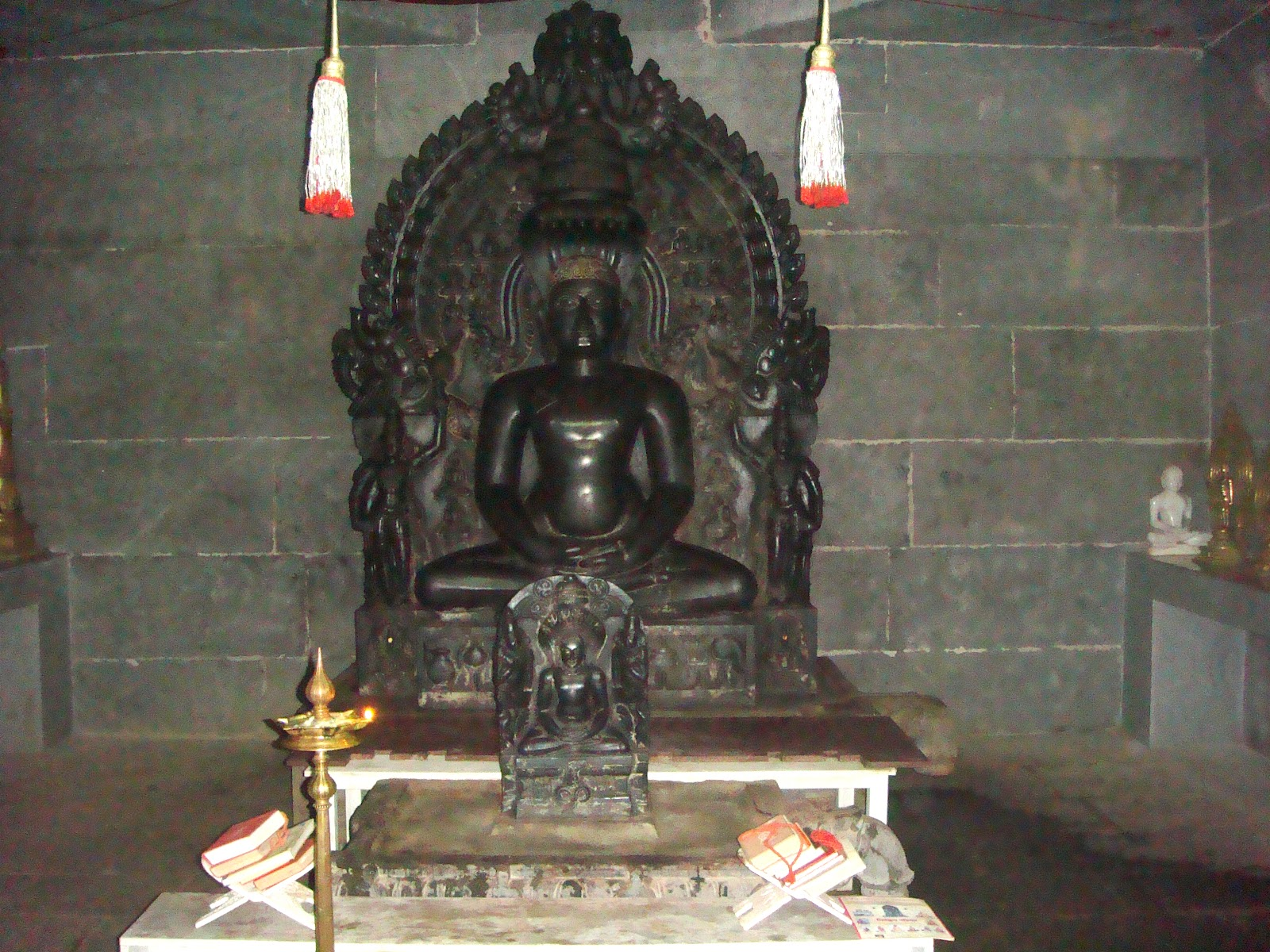
Mulnayak Shri Parshvanath within the main temple at the Mel Sithamur Jain Math.

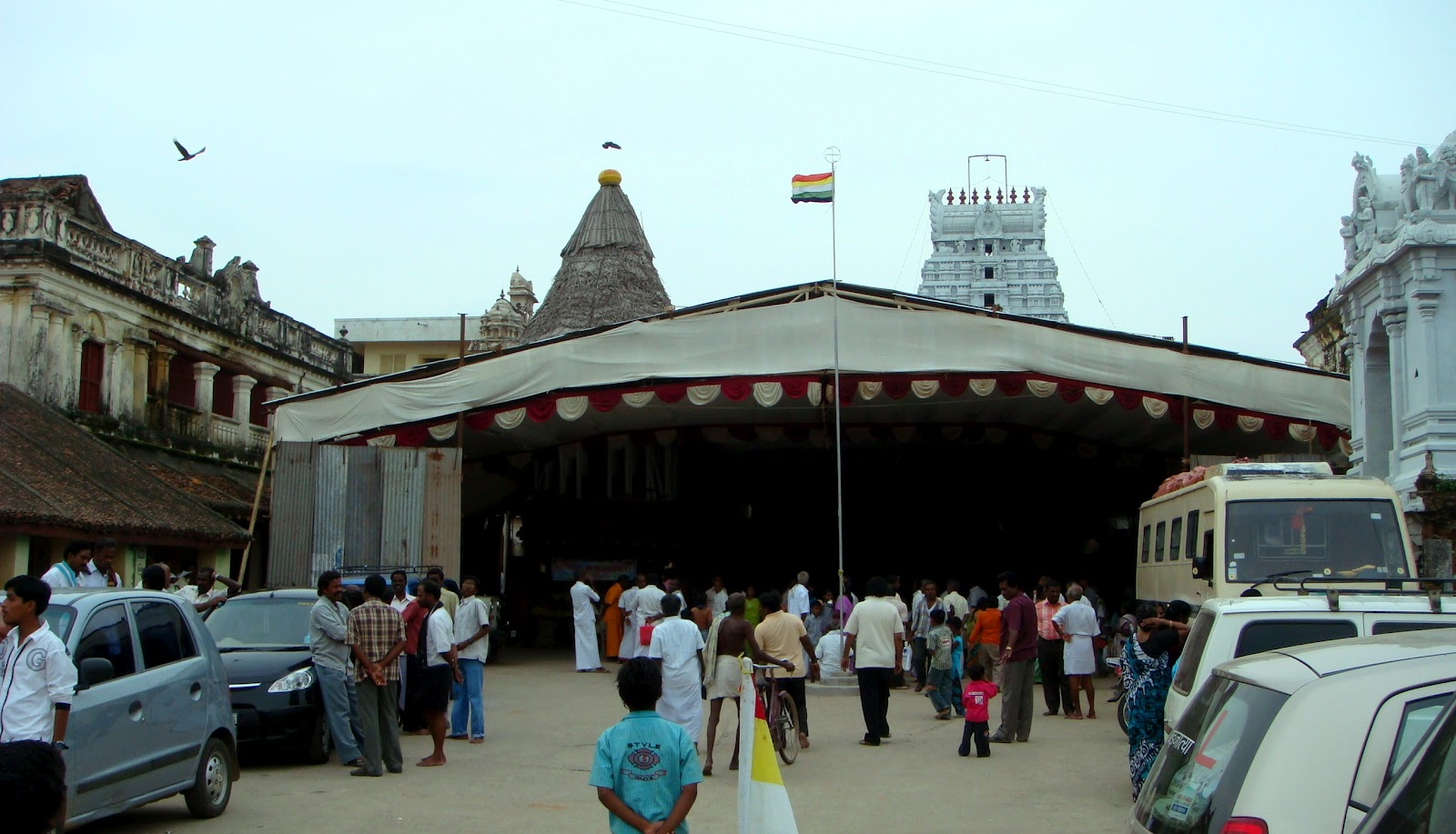
During a festival morning at the Mel Sithamur Jain Math.

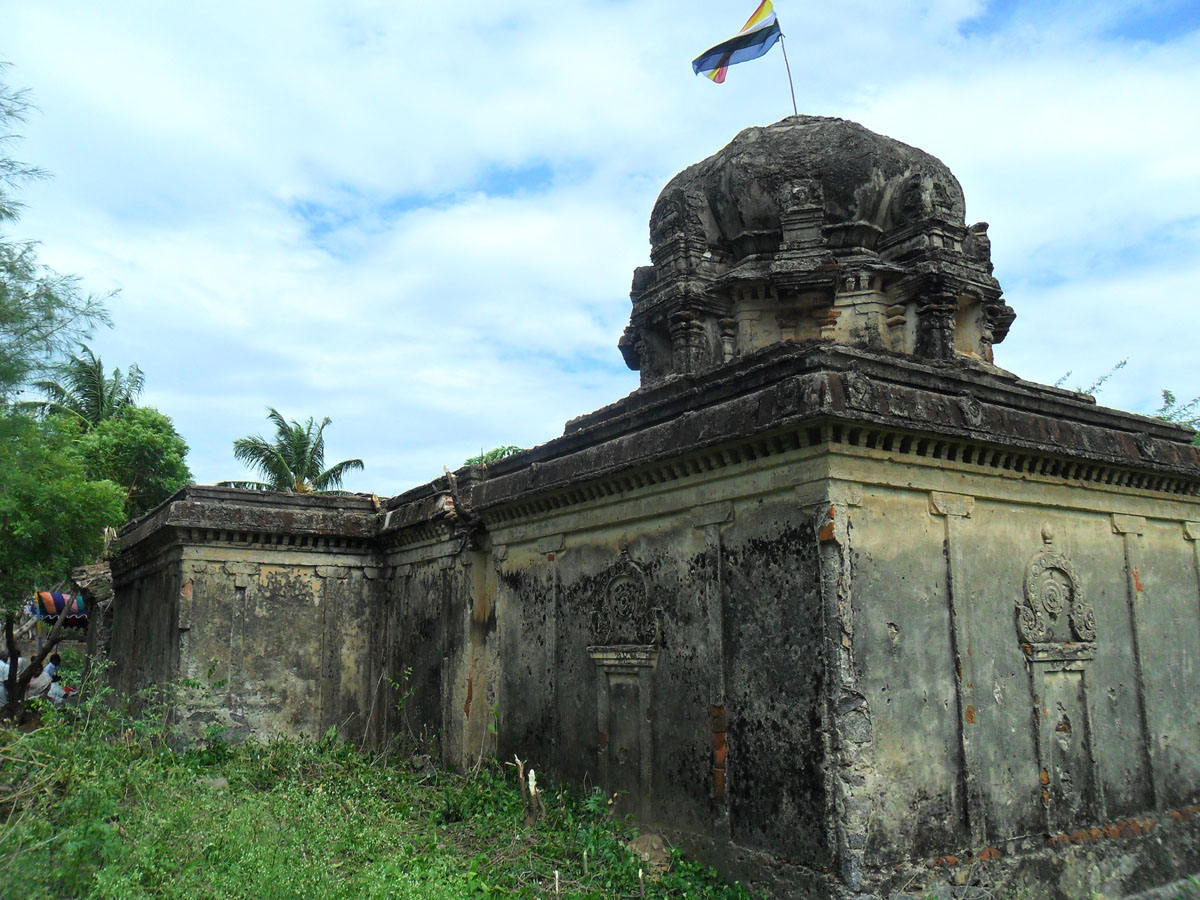
Jain flag atop the Gingee Jain temple, Gingee, Villupuram district, Tamil Nadu, India.

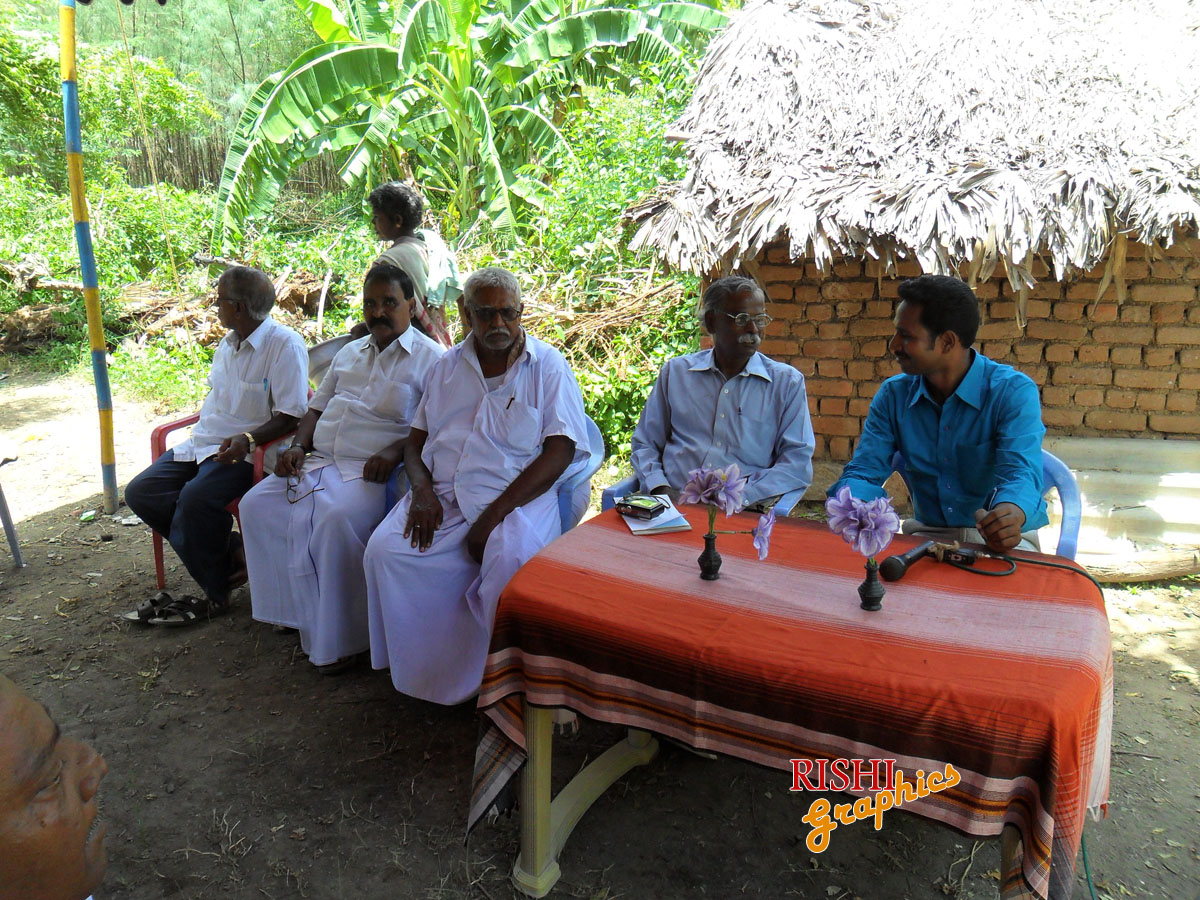
Members of the Tamil Jain community at the Gingee Jain temple, Gingee, Villupuram district, Tamil Nadu, India.

== Tamil Jain Books ==
"Jeevaka Chinthamani", "Sripurana" by J Srichandran.

== See also ==
- Jain Sculpture
- Jainism in Tamil Nadu
- Shikharji
- Mandalapuruder

== Notes ==
=== References ===
- John E. Cort, ed. (1998), Open Boundaries: Jain Communities and Cultures in Indian History, SUNY Press, ISBN 0-7914-3785-X
