= Onampakkam =

Village in Tamil Nadu, India

Coordinates: 12°23′01″N 79°57′44″E

Onampakkam is a small village in Maduranthakam taluk in Chengalpattu district in the Indian state of Tamil Nadu. The major occupation of the people living at this place is agriculture. In 2011, it had a population of 4000.

== Location ==
Onampakkam is located 14 kilometres (8.7 mi) east of Melmaruvathur, 8 kilometres (5.0 mi) west of Cheyyur and 21 kilometres (13 mi) northwest of Marakkanam.

== Transportation ==
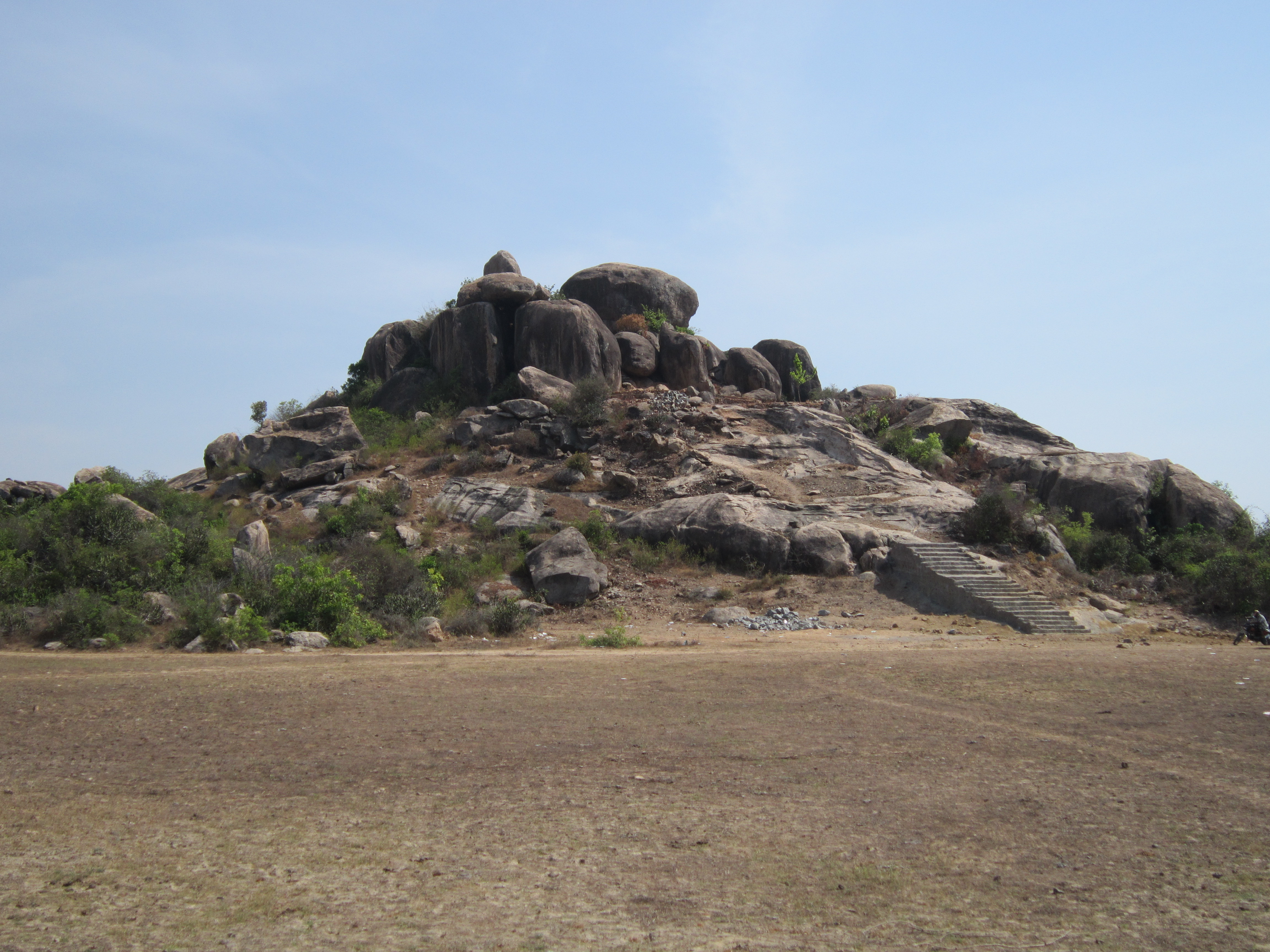
Kurathimalai

All buses depart from Madhuranthagam and Melmaruvathur bus stand to Cheyyur go via Onampakkam. To reach the Jain hillocks, one has to align at Ayyanar kovil bus stop. From here, the site is at a one km distant.

== About the village ==
Onampakkam has more than 1200 years of heritage. It was a Jain centre during 8th century C.E. There are four hillocks namely Kurathimalai, Koosamalai, Pattimalai and Venmanimalai seen. Among these hillocks, Kurathimalai and Koosamalai have historical importance and were extensively used by Jain Monks and Tamil Jains.

== Kurathimalai ==
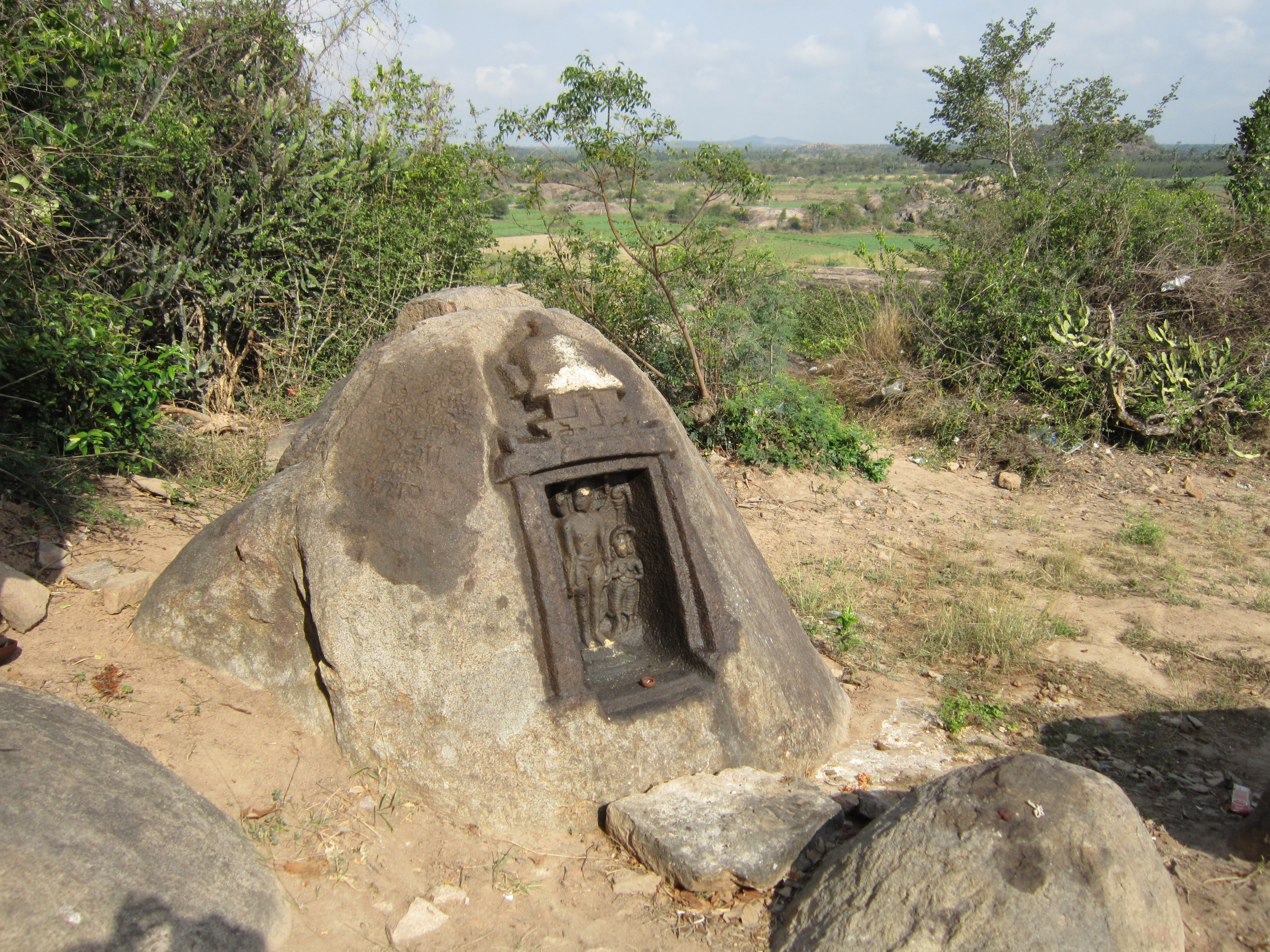
Parshvanathar

This hillock is located northeast of Onampakkam and is very near L. N. Puram village. Parshavanthar (Parshva) image facing east, is nicely carved on a small rock and was built like a small temple. An image of a five headed snake which is covering the head of Parshavanathar and yakshan & yakshi (yakshini) on the either side are also seen. On the right side, an inscription in grantha and Tamil characters is seen. This inscription states that Vasudeva Siddhantha Padarar, a Jain monk who governed the "Irupathi Irandu" (Tamil: இருபத்து இரண்டு) branch of Tamil Jains, had built this temple. Rock carved images of Adhinathar (Adinath) and Mahaveerar (Mahavira) are also seen in two places at a few feet distance. These sculpture belongs to 8th Century AD.

Ten stone beds are seen in two places on this hillock. One group of five stone beds are seen on the top of the hill. These beds are carved on a rock facing east. Above these beds, on a rock, a long narrow line were carved to protect the beds from water inflow. On the east of this hillock, another group of five stone beds are seen facing north. A dried pond is also seen on the hillock.

== Koosamalai ==
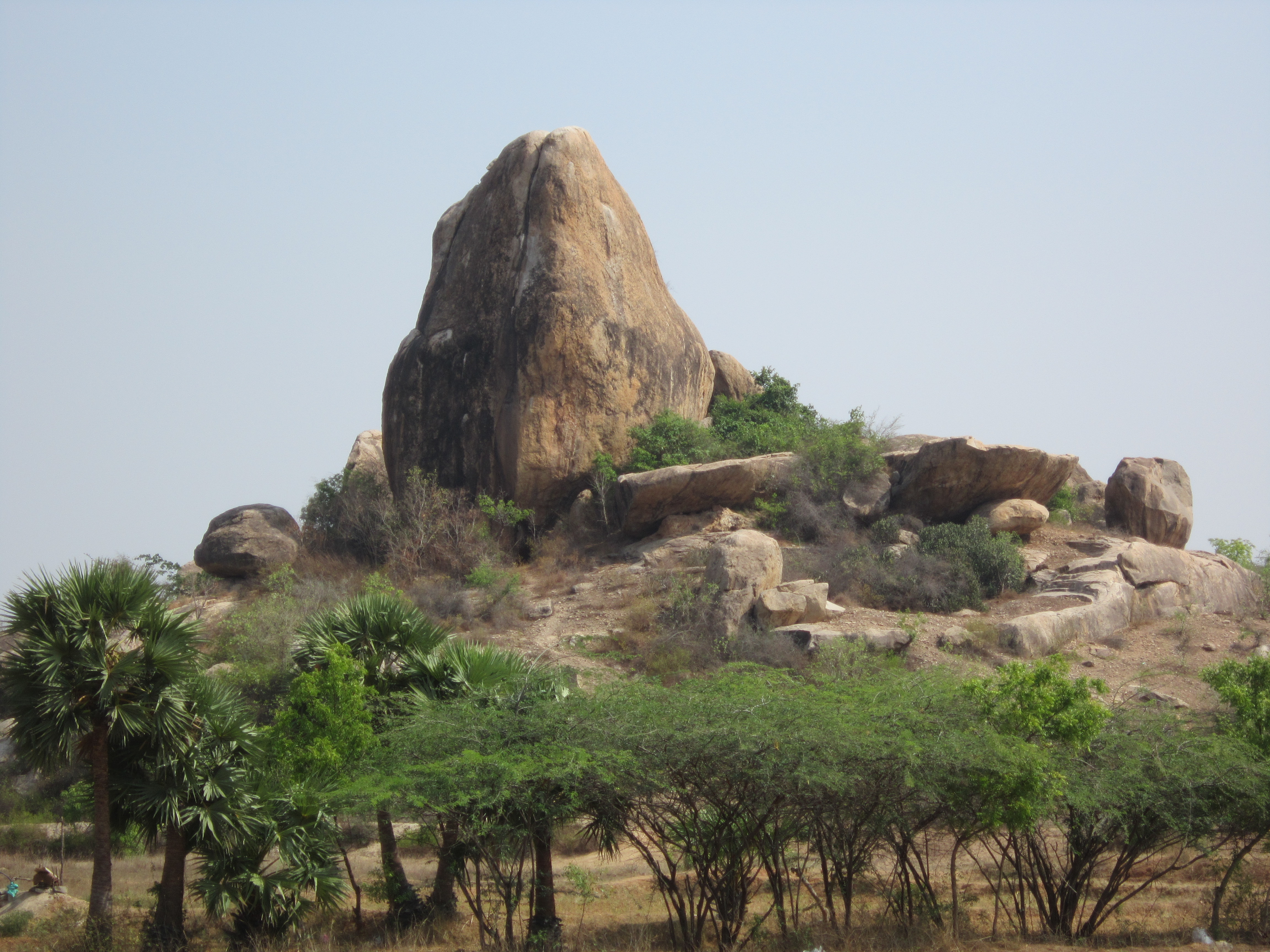
Koosamalai

This hillock is located exactly west of Kurathimalai. A place in this hillock called "Pandhakal" where five stone beds are seen. Near to these beds, two ponds are seen. On the south of this hillock, a deep cave is seen. In the entrance of the cave, a stone which is worshipped as goddess "Kodi Aathal" by the villagers. Another dried pond is also seen a few feet above this cave.

== Recent activities ==
Recently, some group of Tamil Jains mainly belonging to Kanchipuram district started worshipping and have built steps to reach the top of the Kurathimalai Hillock. The presence of a stone quarry near to these hillock is a threat to this valuable place and also to the local people.

== Picture gallery ==
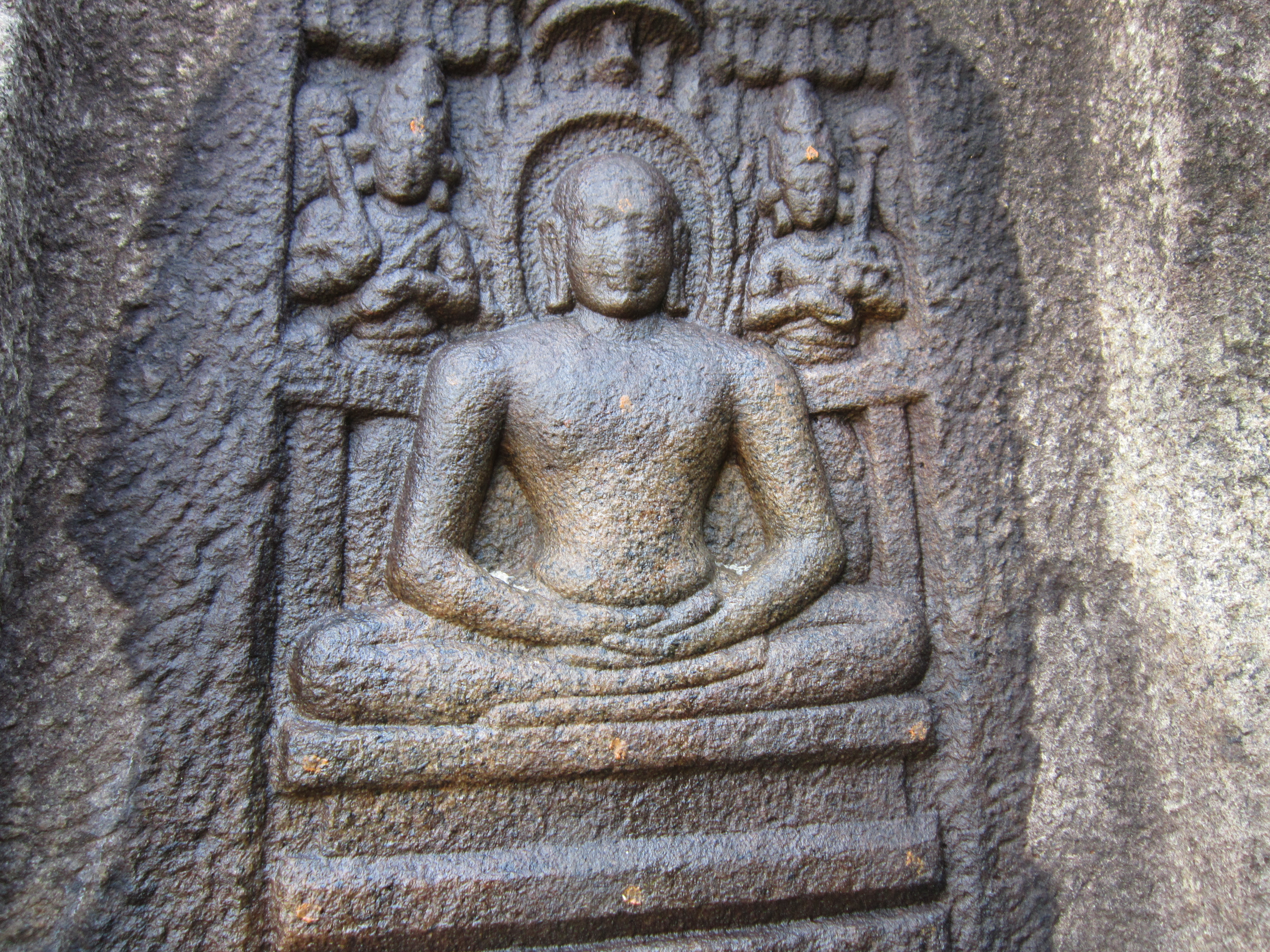
Adhinathar

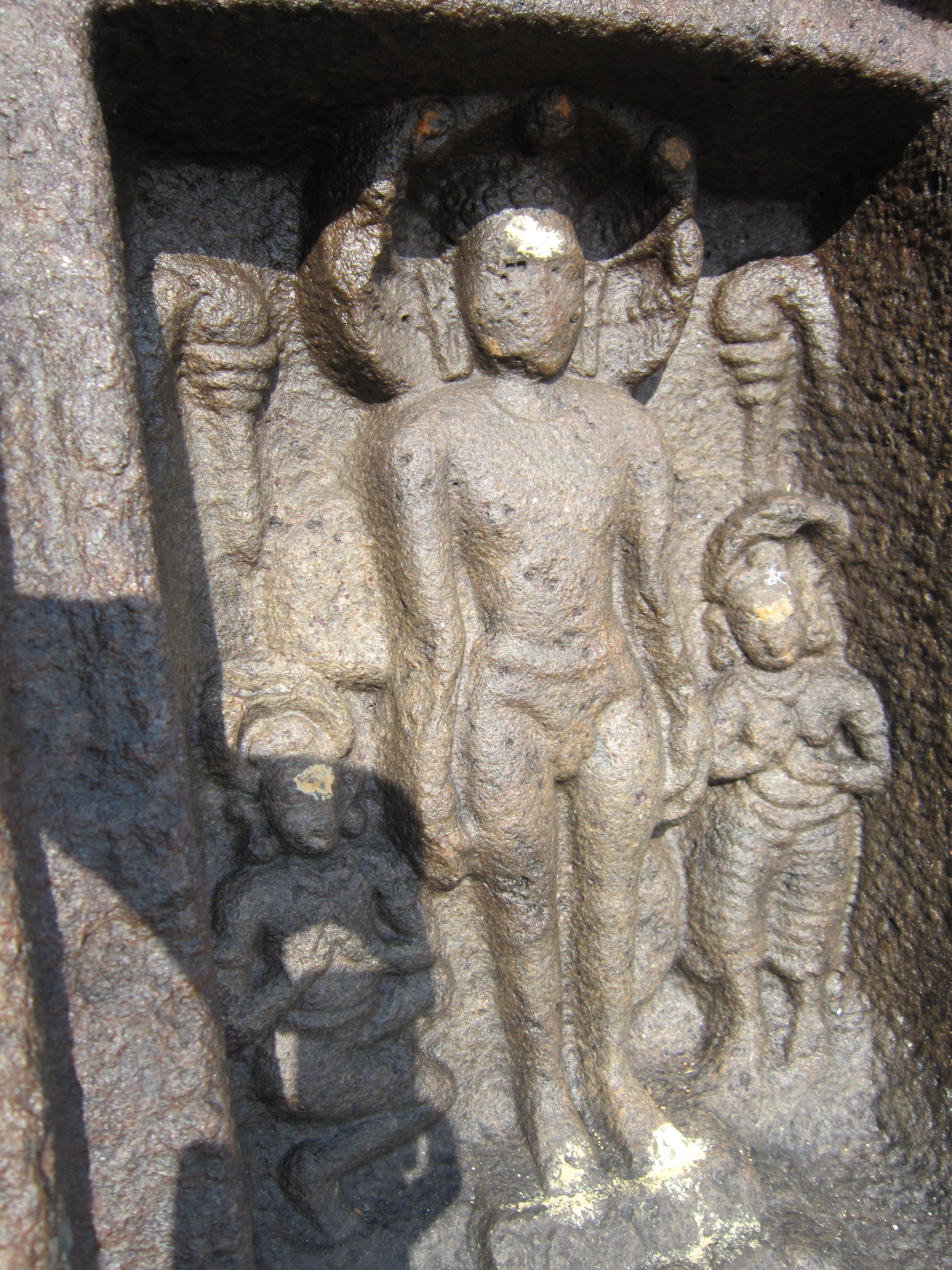
Parshvanathar

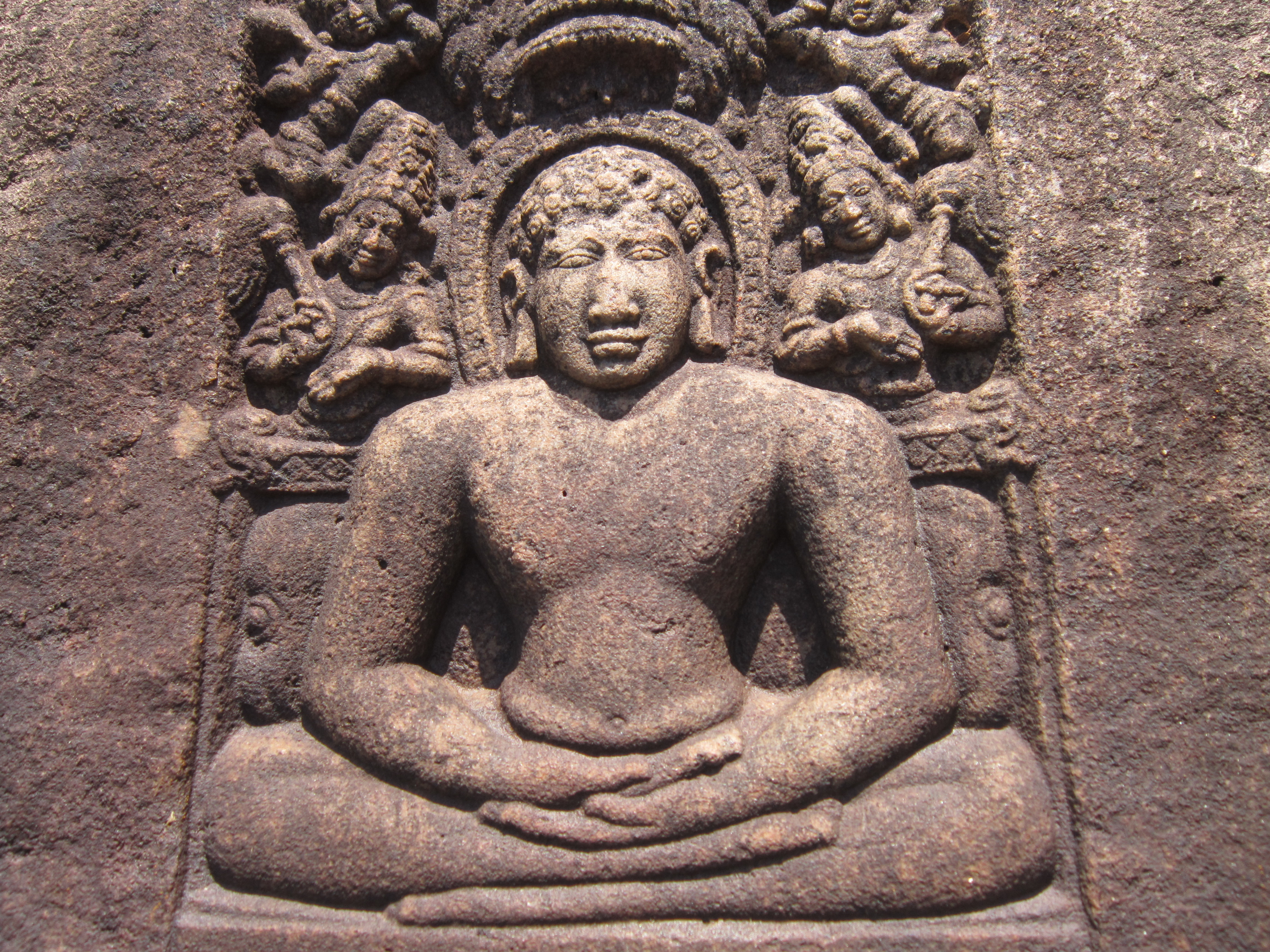
Mahaveerar

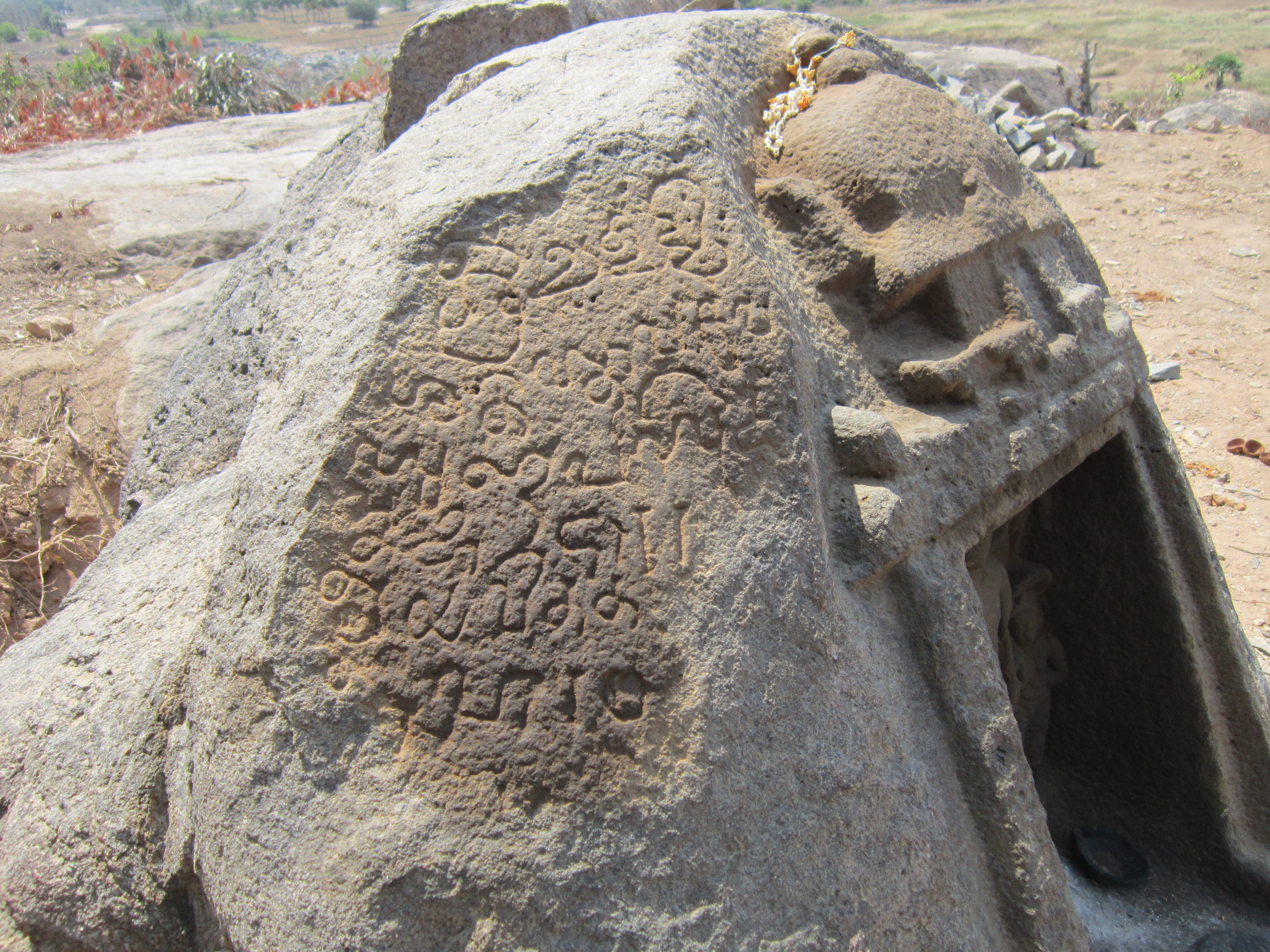
Inscription with Tamil and Grantha characters

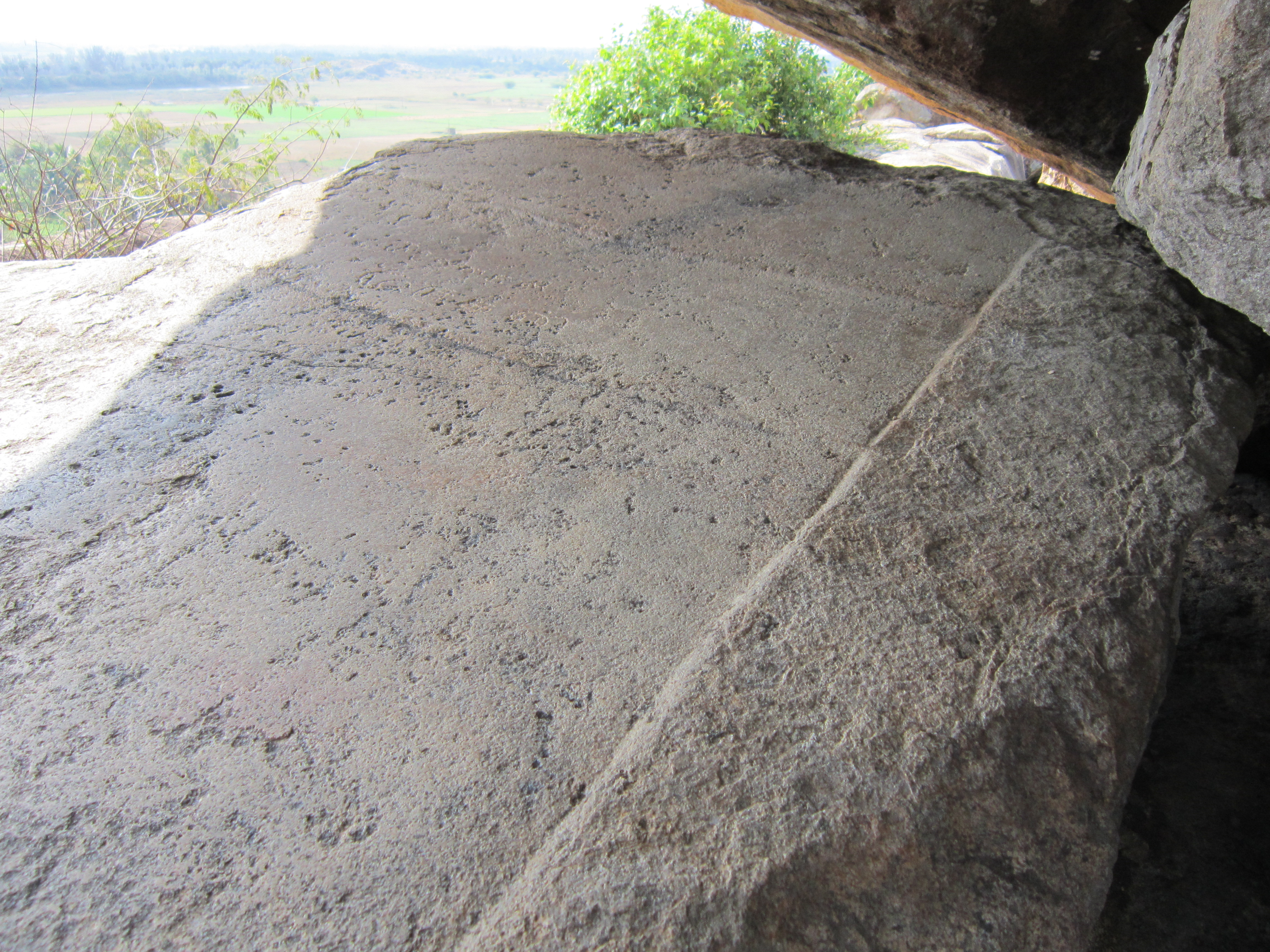
Kurathimalai Jain beds 1

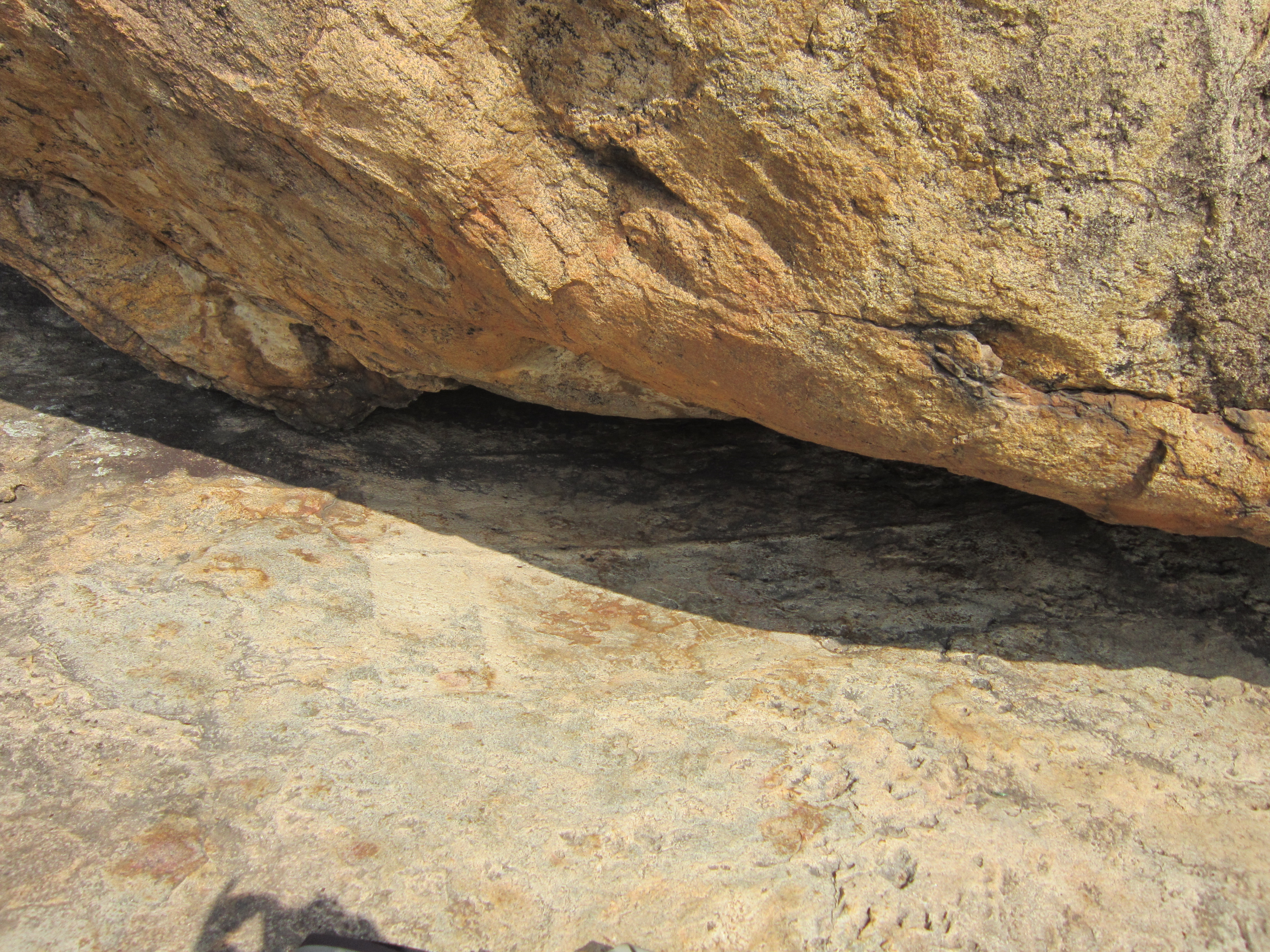
Kurathimalai Jain beds 2

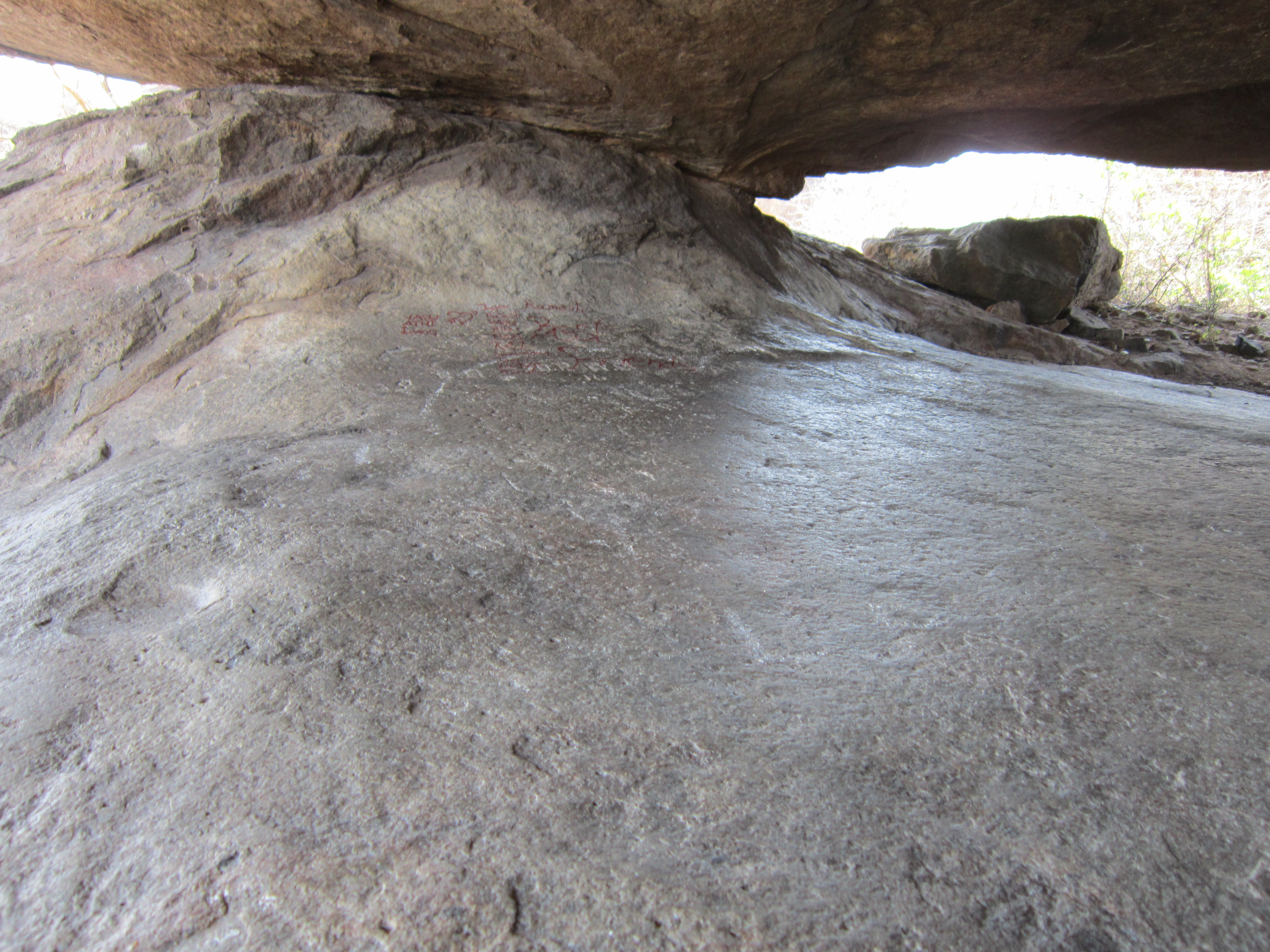
Koosamalai Jain beds

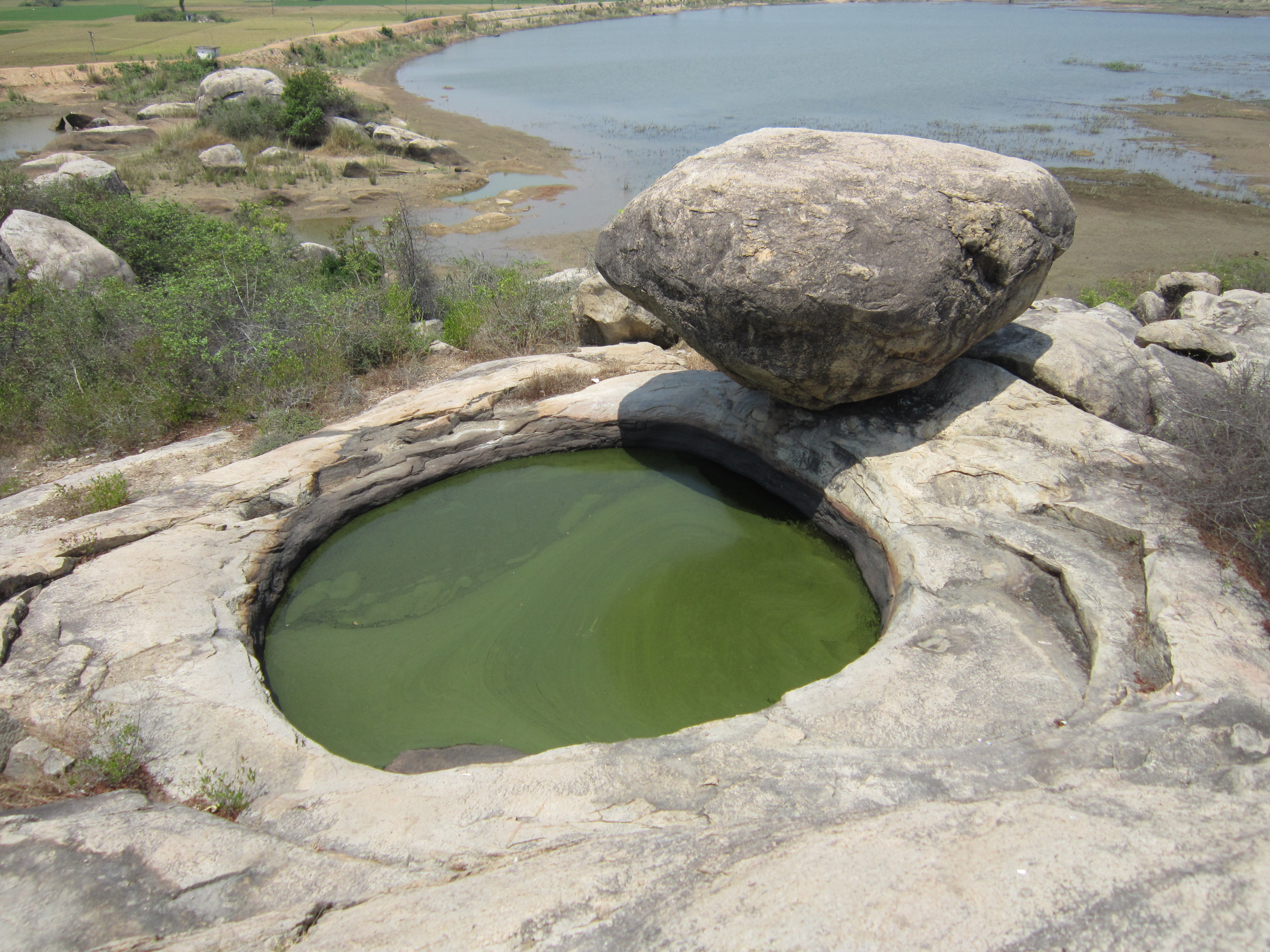
Koosamalai pond

== See also ==
- Jainism in Tamil Nadu
