= Thirakoil =

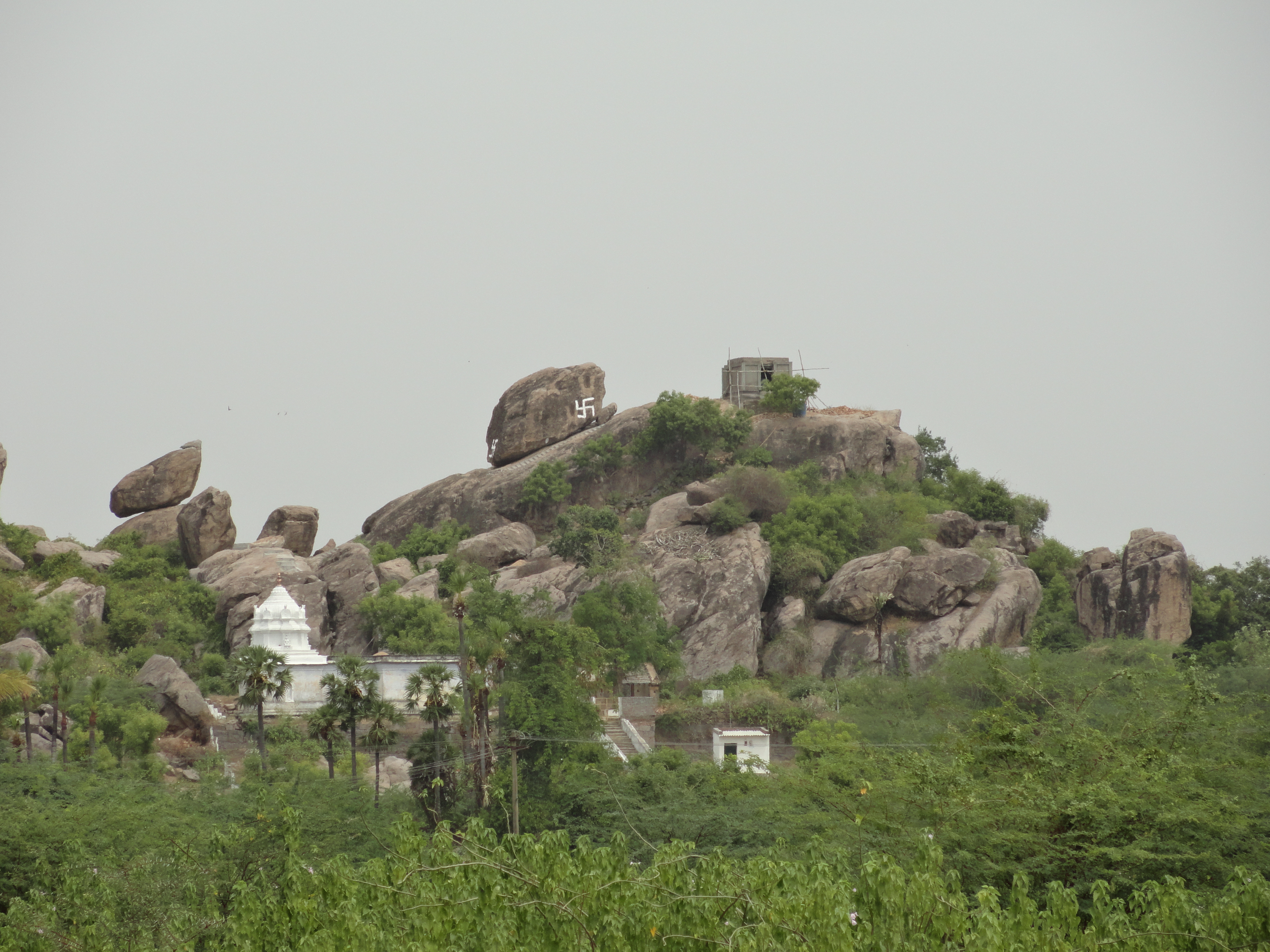

- Location in Tamil Nadu, India
- 12.4525°N 79.4986°E
- Location: Tiruvannamalai, India

Thirakoil is a village in Tellar taluk in Tiruvannamalai district in the Indian state of Tamil Nadu. The major occupation of the people living in this place is agriculture.

== Etymology ==
It is believed that this place got its name from the word "thurugal" (Tamil: துறுகல்) meaning rock. Later it modified to "thirakol" (Tamil: திறக்கோல்) then became Thirakoil (Tamil: திறக்கோயில்).

== Information ==
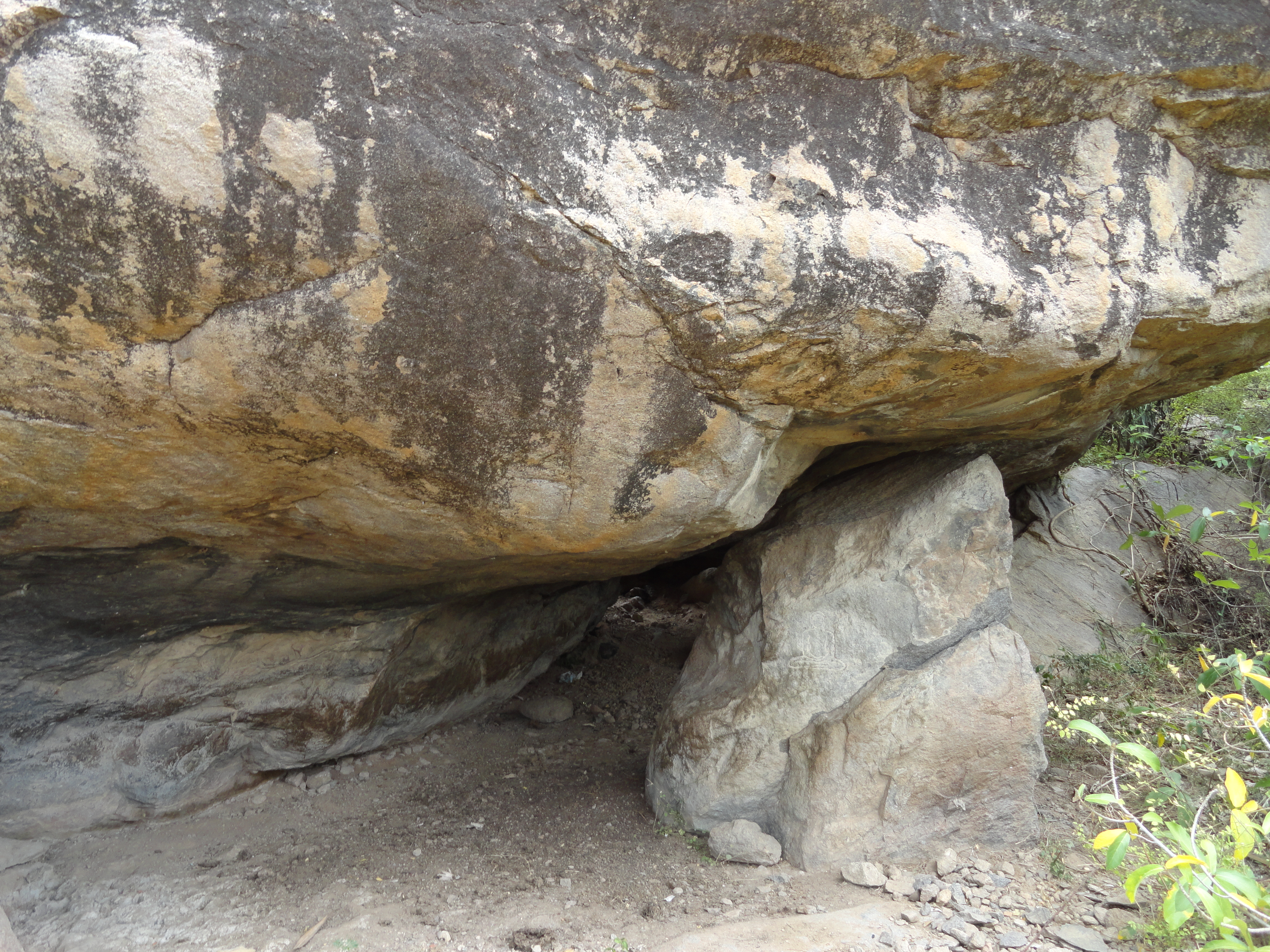
Cave and the carving

- Name of the Place = Thirakoil
- Taluk = Tellar
- District = Tiruvannamalai
- State = Tamil Nadu
- Country = India
- Coordinates = 12°27'9"N 79°29'55"E
- Area = 1 km^{2}
- Population = 953 (2011)
- Maximum People = Yadhava

== Location ==
Thirakoil is located 15 km southwest of Vandavasi, 7 km from Ponnur Kundkundar Philosophical Center. Thirakoil hill runs 1 km in northeast direction.

== Transportation ==
Only private bus facilities are available to the nearest place Desur and Kilputhur. One has to walk approximately one km to reach Thirakoil.

== Thirakoil Hill and the Digambara Jain Temple ==
There are three small caves present in the hill. One at the mid-South, other two at west and east side of the hill. These caves were used as Jain abodes during 8th Century.These caves were naturally formed in which Jain Monks lived. There is a monolithic stone of 25 feet high in which idols of four tirthankars (Mahavira, Parshva or Parsavanathar, Rishabha or Kilaku Rishabanathar and Chandranathar) were carved nicely at the four sides. Until the 10th century this place was called Thandapuram (Tamil: தண்டபுரம்). Raja Raja Chola I's inscriptions of 1007 A. D. quotes these cave abodes as Sankaraippalli (Tamil: சங்கரைப் பள்ளி) and Mai Sutthappalli (Tamil: மை சுத்தப் பள்ளி). Bhagavan Mahavira's idol is worshipped at the temple which is recently built.

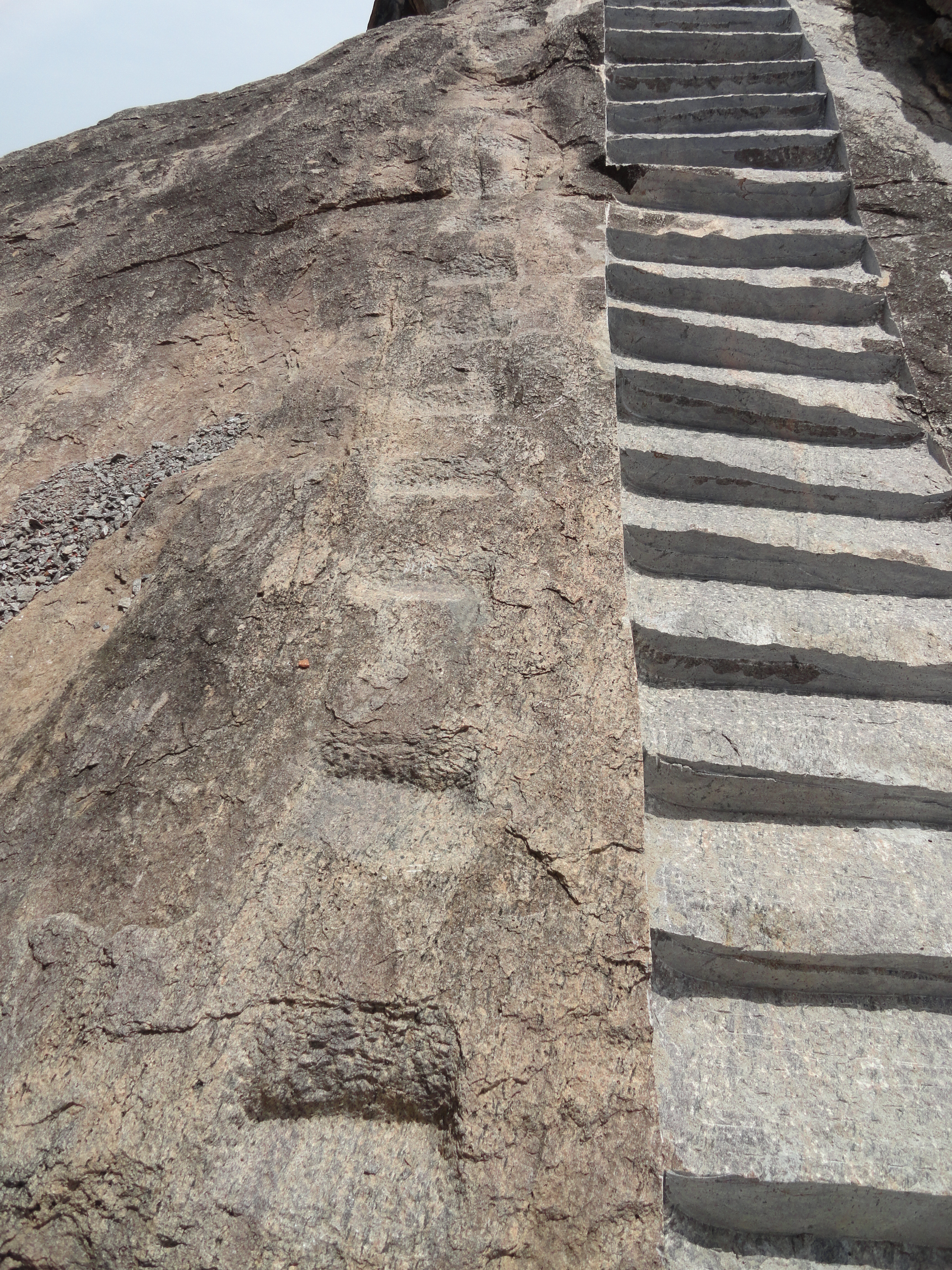
Old and New Steps

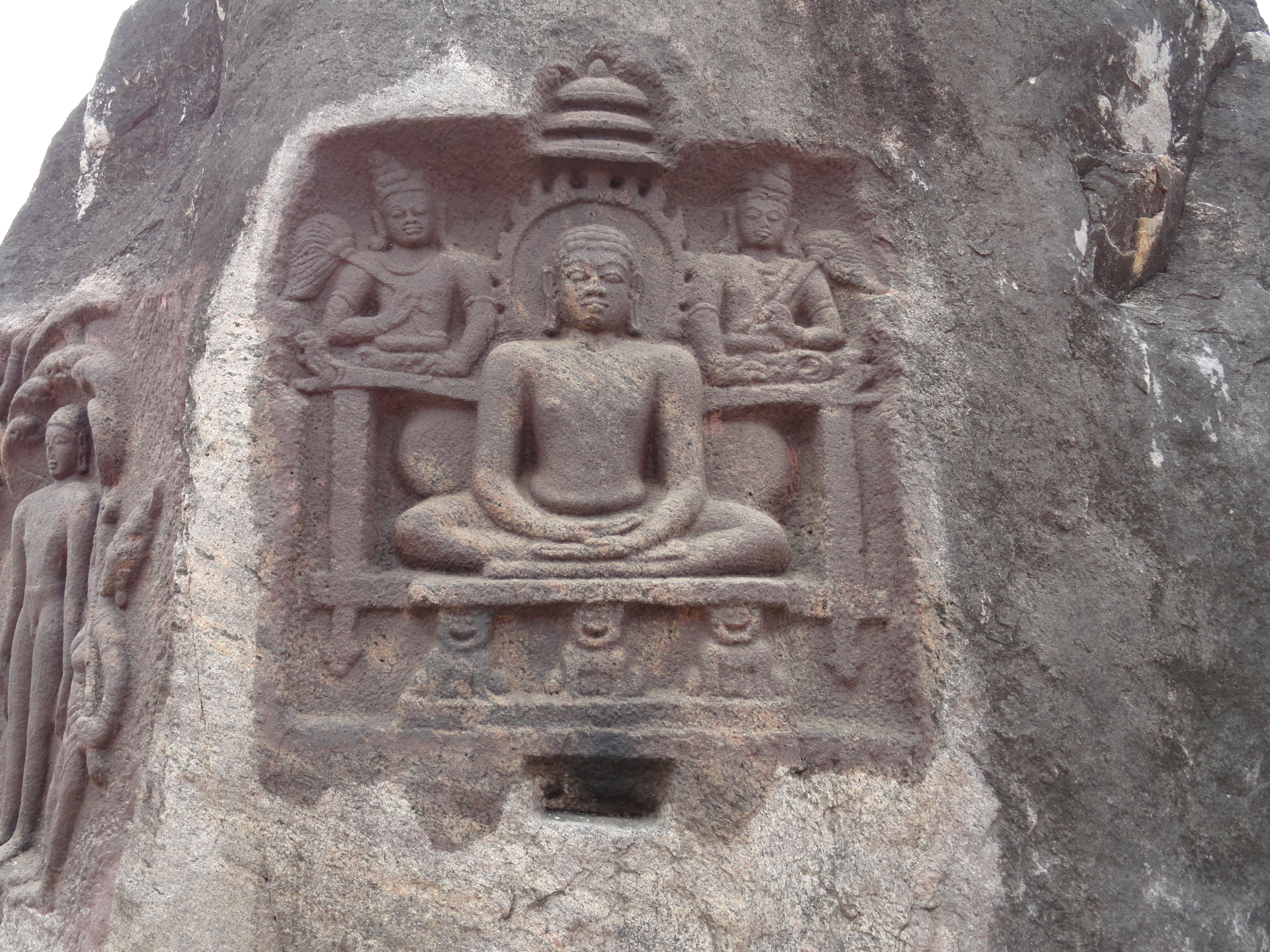
Mahavira

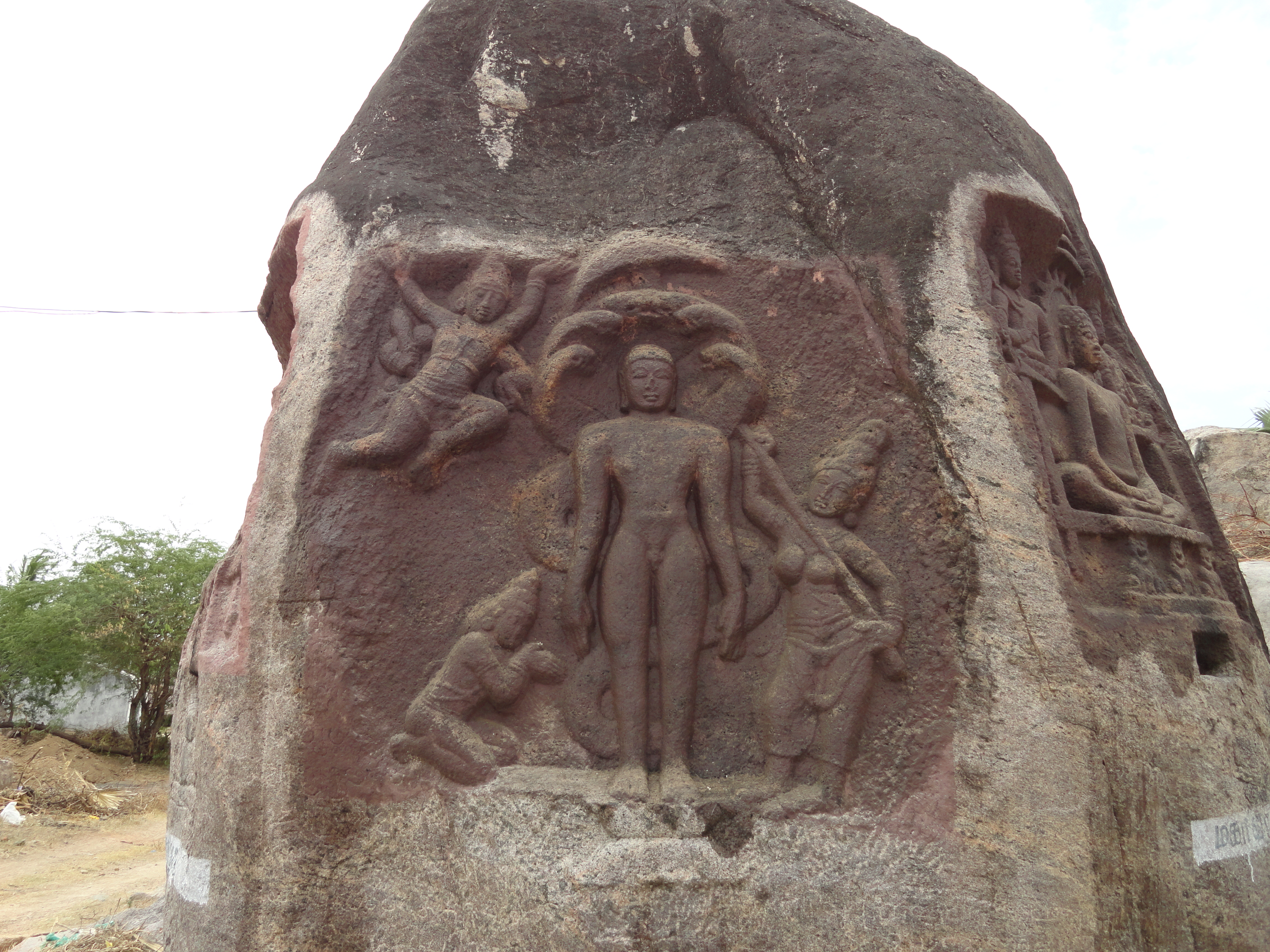
Parshva or Parsavanathar, 23rd tirthankar. This carving depicts Parsavanathar in meditating position and Dharanendiran, Padmavathy protecting him using umbrella from kamadan who was his past life enemy from throwing rocks to disturb him.

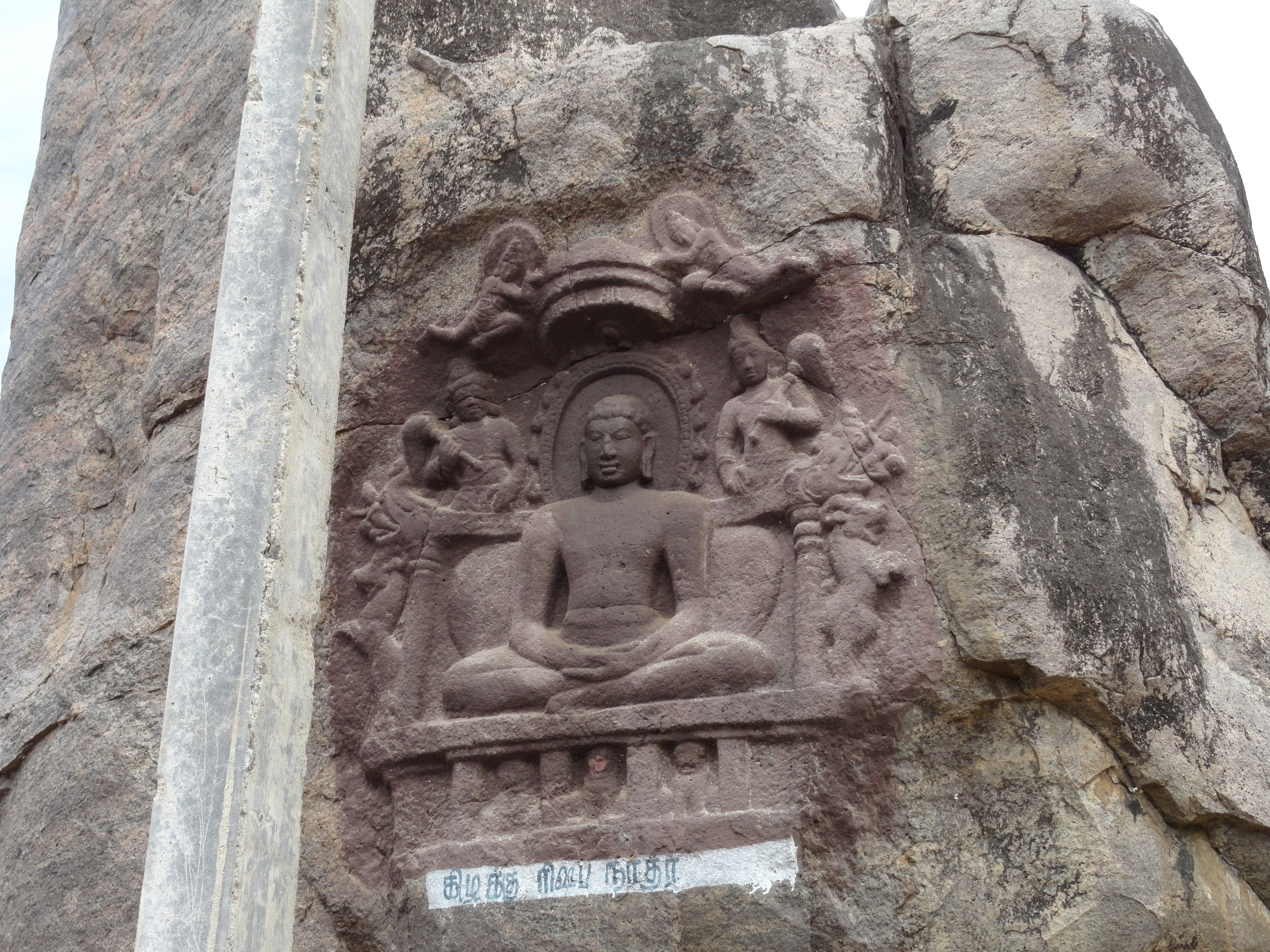
Rishabha or Kilaku Rishabanathar

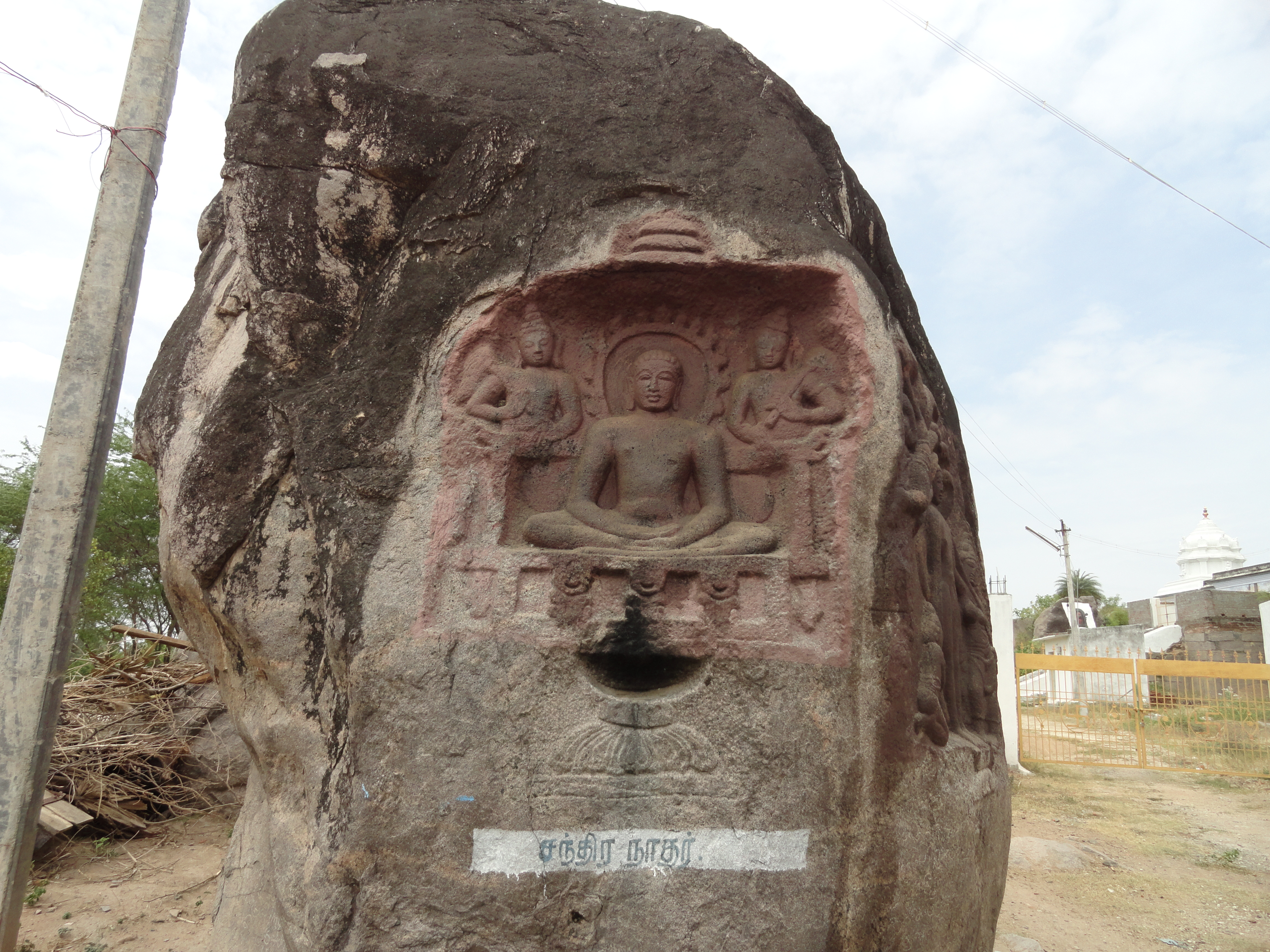
Chandranathar (Chandraprabha)

== See also ==
- Jainism
- Tamil Jain
- List of Jain temples
- Jain Sculpture
- Jain temple
