= S. Sripal =

Indian police chief

- Born: 1938
- Died: 25 March 2014 (aged 75–76)
- Occupations: Director General of Police, Chennai, IPS Officer

S. Sripal was an Indian police commissioner who was Director General of Police in Tamil Nadu.

== Early life ==
He was born of a devout and erudite Tamil Jain family from a village about 125 kilometres (78 mi) south of Chennai.

After graduation in Economics from Loyola College, Chennai, Sripal entered the Indian Police Service in 1960 and rose from the rank of Assistant superintendent of Police to the top-most post of Director General of Police.

== Professional career ==
Sripal was Assistant Superintendent of Police in the towns of Namakkal and Madurai, and Superintendent of Police in North Arcot district and Madurai district. He worked to end gang warfare in Kolli Hills, Kalrayan Hills and Madurai town and was involved in cases such as apprehending wire thieves in Salem district and a gang of murderers responsible for killing taxi drivers. Later, he moved into specialised fields such as CID. He served as Commissioner of Police in Chennai for over five years and was the Chief of Police in Tamil Nadu state between 1991–95.

In recognition of his service, Sripal was awarded the Police medal and the President of India Police Medal.

Sripal participated in the Asian Pacific Conference of Prison Administrators held at Delhi in 1989, where he spoke on “Penal Philosophy", and he represented India in the International Police Organization General Assembly meeting held in Rome in 1994.

Sripal has written quite a few Tamil-language books, including:

1. Thiruvalluvar Vaazhththum Aadhipakavan (திருவள்ளுவர் வாழ்த்தும் ஆதிபகவன்)
2. Chintamani Poonga (Garden of Thoughts)
3. Painthamizh Poonga (Garden of Sweet Tamil).

He has also contributed to periodicals, magazines, All India Radio and Doordarshan. He was the architect of the Research Foundation for Jainology in Tamil Nadu, of which he was the chairman for over a decade from its inception. He had succeeded in creating a full-fledged Department of Jainology in Madras University which also conducts courses through correspondence. He was largely instrumental in publishing under the auspices of this department a book entitled A topographical list of Jain Inscriptions in Tamil Nadu. This book enumerates 530 inscriptions in almost all the districts of Tamil Nadu some of which date back to before the Christian era.
