= Tirumalai (Tamil Nadu) =

- Engunavirai-Tirumalai (Tamil); Arhasugiri
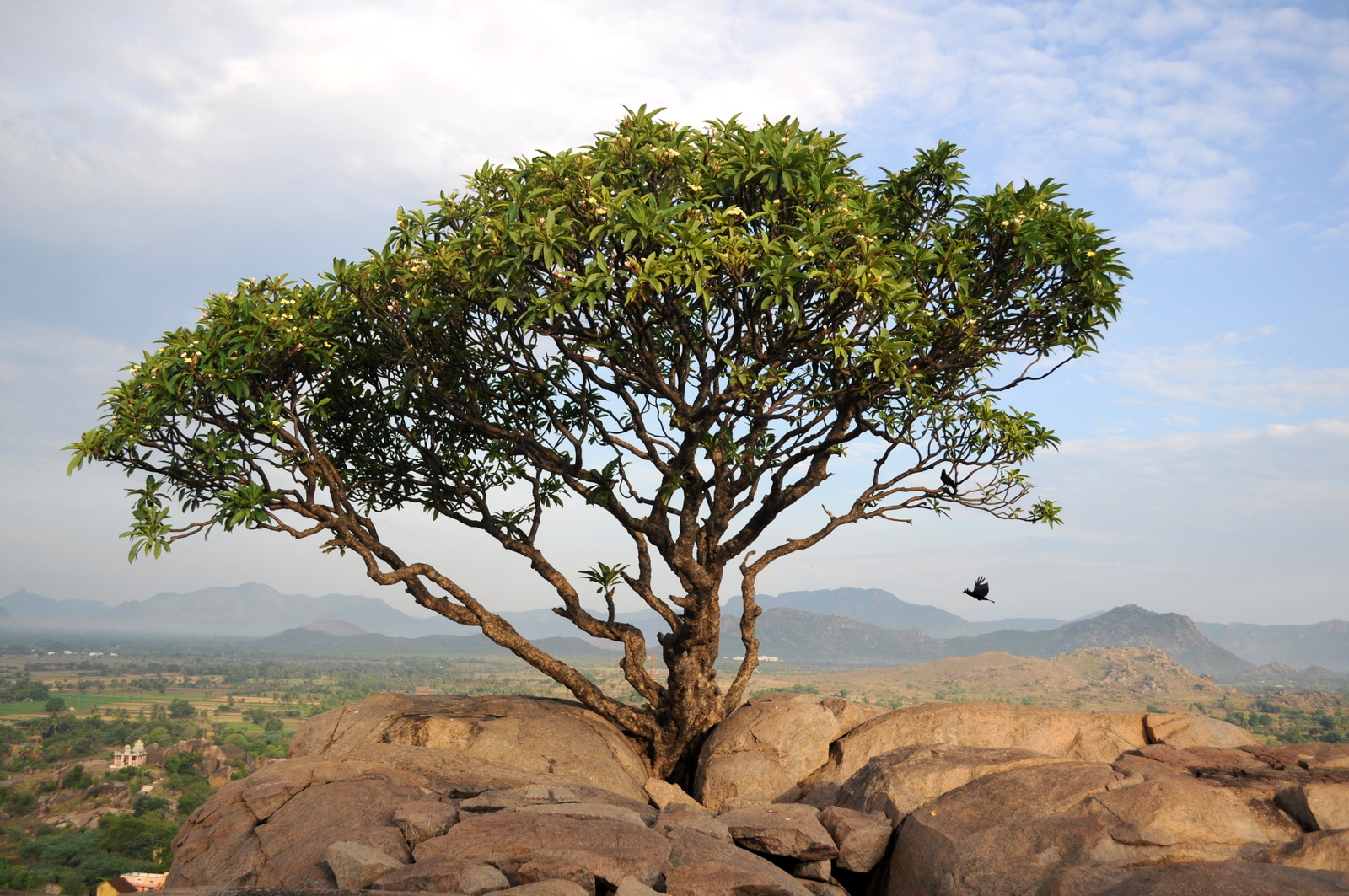
- Peak of Tirumalai

Religion
- Affiliation: Jainism
- Deity: Neminath
- Festival: Mahavir Janma Kalyanak

Location
- Location: Tiruvannaamalai, Tiruvannamalai district, Tamil Nadu
- Interactive map of Tirumalai
- Coordinates: 12.556675°N 79.205946°E

Architecture
- Established: 9th century CE
- Temple: 2

Tirumalai (lit. "the holy mountain"; also later Arhasugiri, lit. "the excellent mountain of the Arha[t]"; Tamil Engunavirai-Tirumalai, lit. "the holy mountain of the Arhar" is a Jain temple and cave complex dating from at least the 9th century CE that is located northwest of Polur in Tamil Nadu, southeast India. The complex includes three Jain caves, two Jain temples and a 16.25-foot-high (4.95 m) sculpture of Tirthankara Neminatha thought to date from the 12th century CE that is the tallest Jain image in Tamil Nadu. Arahanthgiri Jain Math is also present near Tirumalai complex.

== History ==
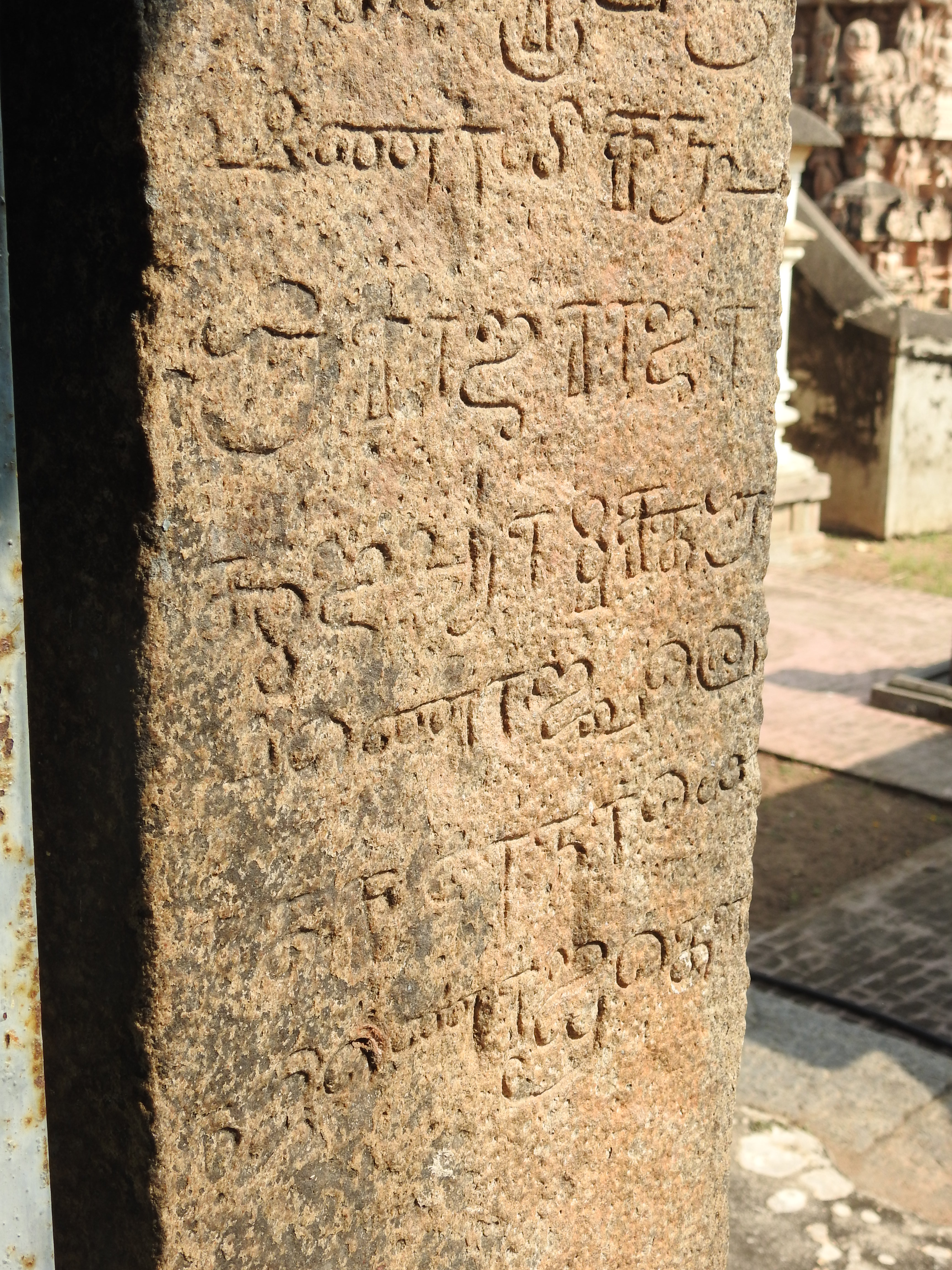
Tirumalai inscription

Tirumalai has been an important Jain center since ancient times. It is believed that 8,000 Jain monks who accompanied Bhadrabahu did the penance and attained nirvana here. The footprints of four great saints - Vrishabhsenachrya, Samanatabhadracharya, Varadattachrya munivar and Sri Vadeepa Simhasuri are also present here. An inscription dating back to 1024 CE is present mentioning the name Kunthavai Jinalaya temple. This inscription mentions the list conquest done by Rajendra Chola I and the offerings made by him to Kunthavai Jinalaya temple.

== Early site ==
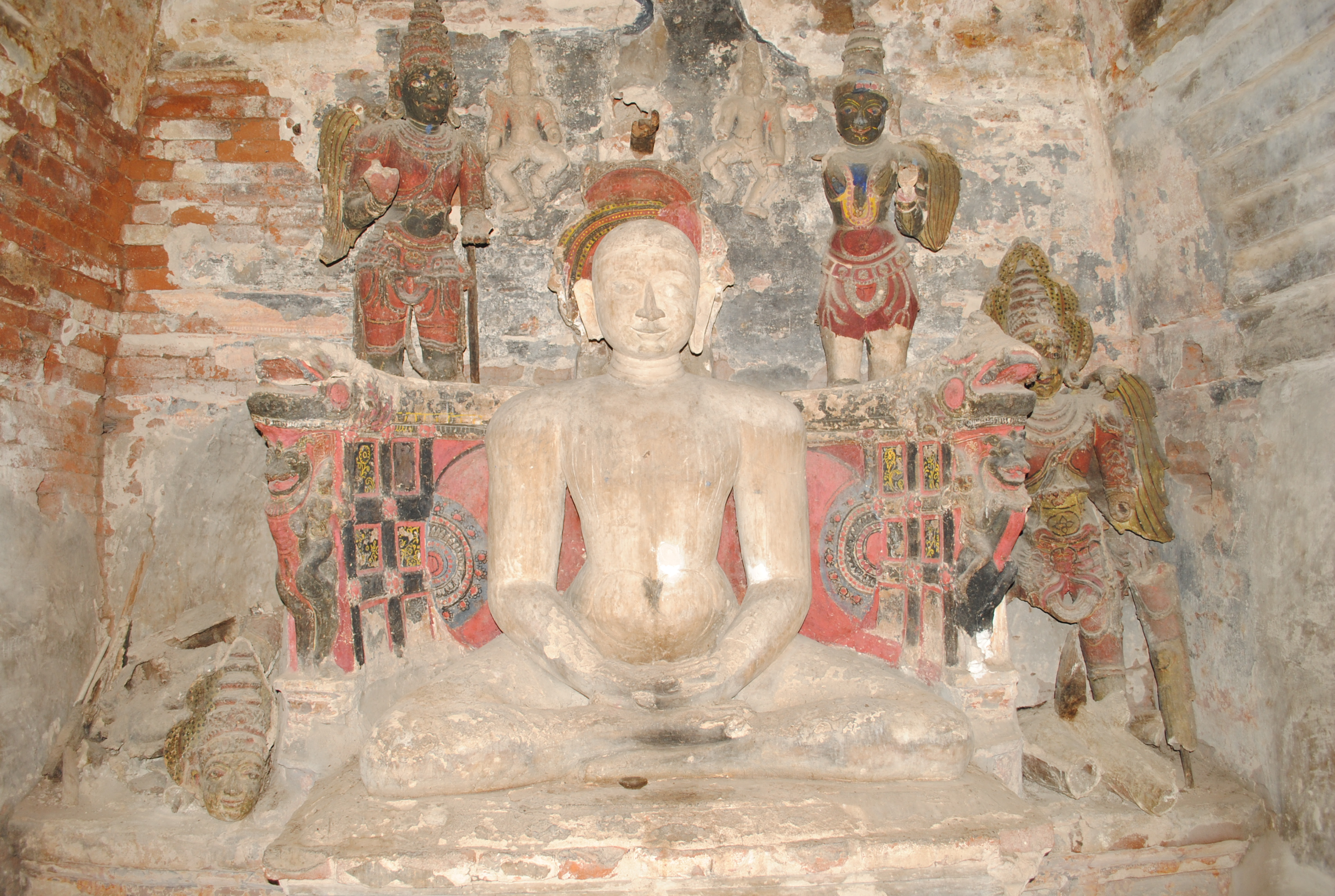
Terrocotta sculpture of Tirthankara

The large cavern at the base of the site is thought to have been built around the 9th century. In the 10th century it was converted into 30 separate chambers, possibly to accommodate figures of Tirthankaras and a yakshi. Similar to the Ellora Caves, the representation of celestial being performs a ritual on tirthankara is present.

An inscription found on a buried rock in front of the gopura at the base of the hill from the late 10th century refers to the site as Vaigai-malai or “the mountain of Vaigai.” Two other inscriptions found on a piece of rock at the top of the hill and buried on a piece of rock underneath the steps between the gopura and the painted cave refer to it as Vaigai-Tirumalai or “the holy mountain of Vaigai.” The name Vaigai is thus thought to be connected with Vaigavur, the historic name of the village at the base of the rock.

== Jain temples ==
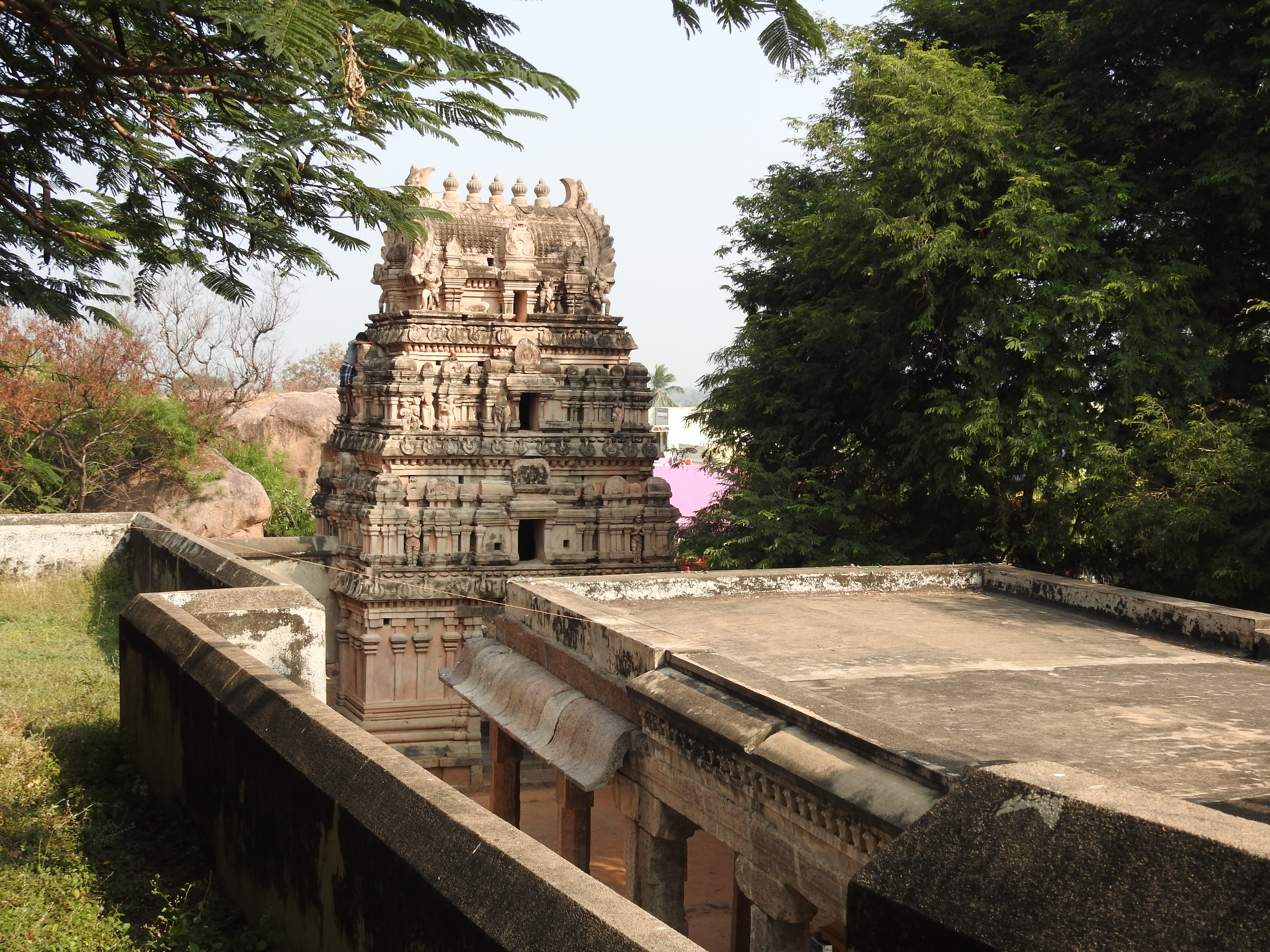
The Mahavira temple

=== Kunthavai Jain temple ===
The Kunthavai Jinalaya temple is a 10th-century Jain temple, said to have been commissioned by the Princess Kundavai of the Chola Dynasty. It is one of two such sites commissioned by her, though the other site, Dadapuram, has not survived.

This temple is situated on top of the Tirumulai hill with engraving of Mahavira flanked by two lions. This temple is partly excavated and partly built within caverons of the rock. This temple is rich in sculptures and base-relief. This temple contains the 16.25 feet (4.95 m) monolithic sculpture of Neminatha. This idol is tallest Jain idol in Tamil Nadu. There are footprints of Jain monks to commemorate their nirvana near the temple.

=== Mahavir temple ===
In the 16th century, a second temple for Mahavir was built to the west of the Kunthavai Jinalaya.

=== Parshvanath temple ===
In the 17th century, a third temple for Parshvanath was constructed.

== Paintings ==
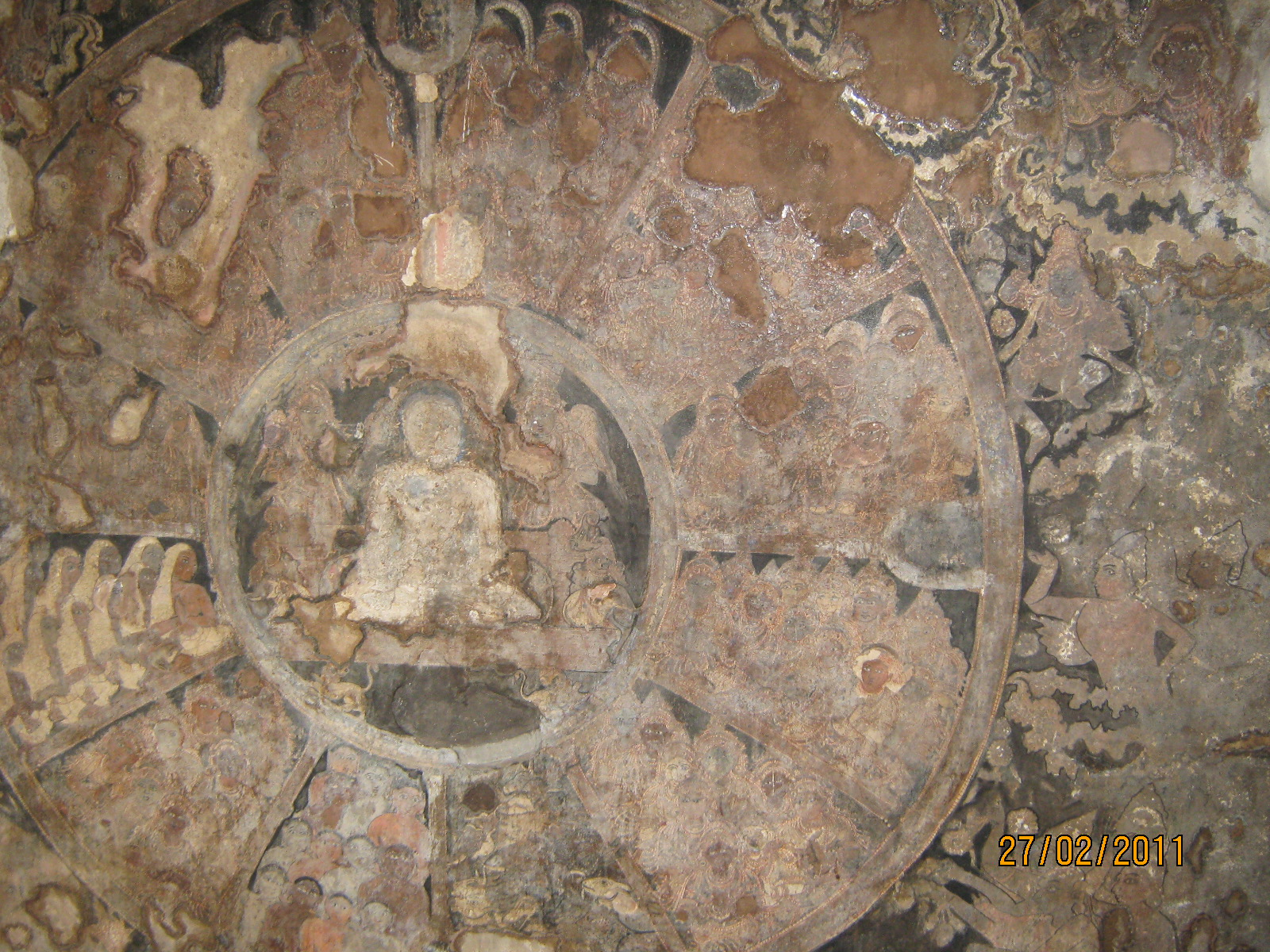
Painting depicting Samavasarana

Paintings are thought to have been added to the site between the 15th-17th centuries. Some of these still survive. These painting are considered comparable to that of present in Ellora Caves.

The painting of Parshvanatha with hood of five snakes venerated by monks, nuns and others is one of the most notable paintings in Tirumali complex. Kuntahavai Jain Temple features a painting with depiction of Samavasarana similar to that of present in Shravanabelagola. The paintings of Ambika, Parshvanatha and Bahubali are also noteworthy.

== Jain Matha ==
Arahanthgiri Jain Math is a Jain Matha that was established near the site in August, 1998.

== Conservation ==
These caves are protected by the Archaeological Survey of India.

== Gallery ==
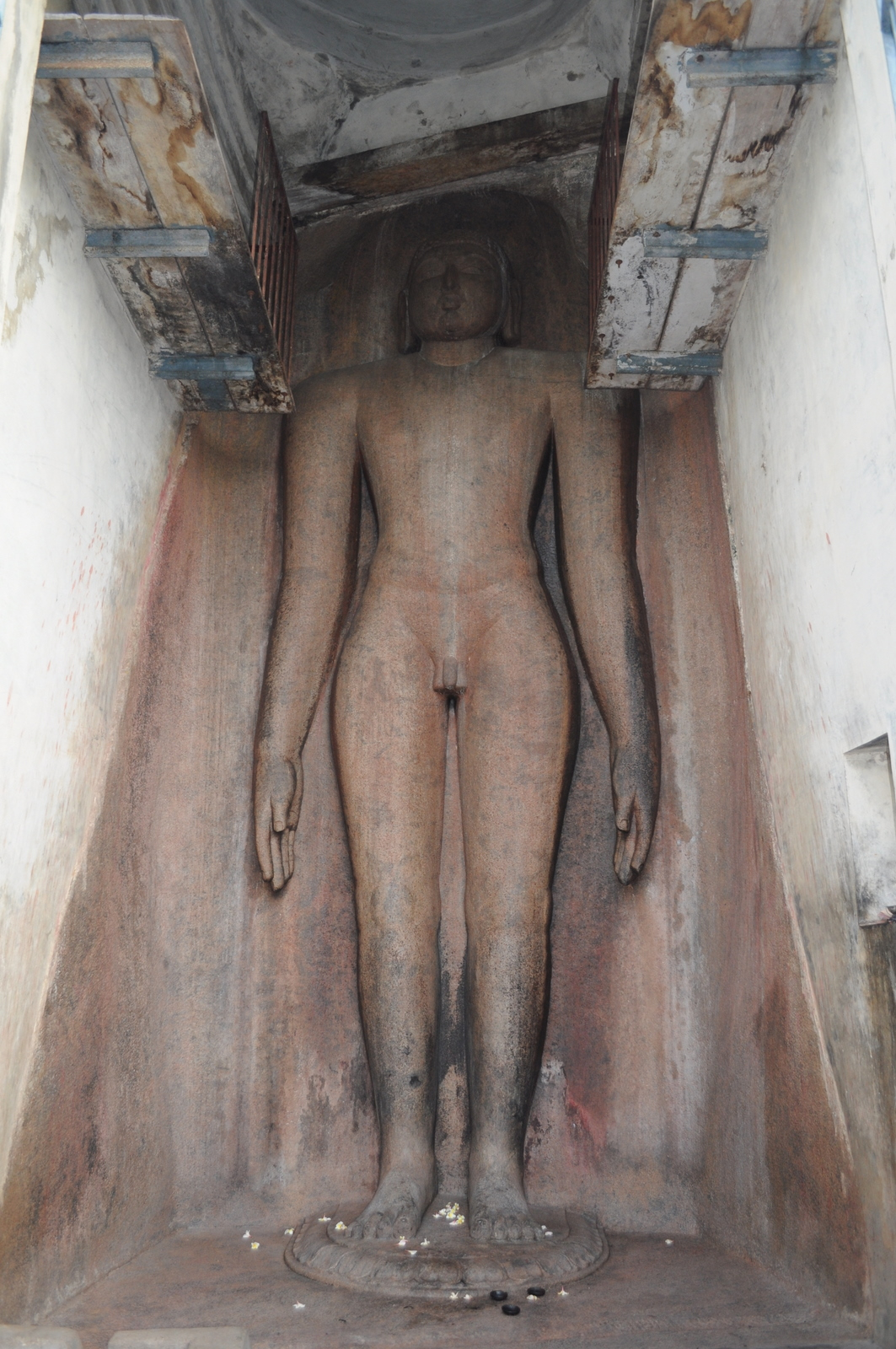
The 16.25 feet (4.95 m) statue of Neminath

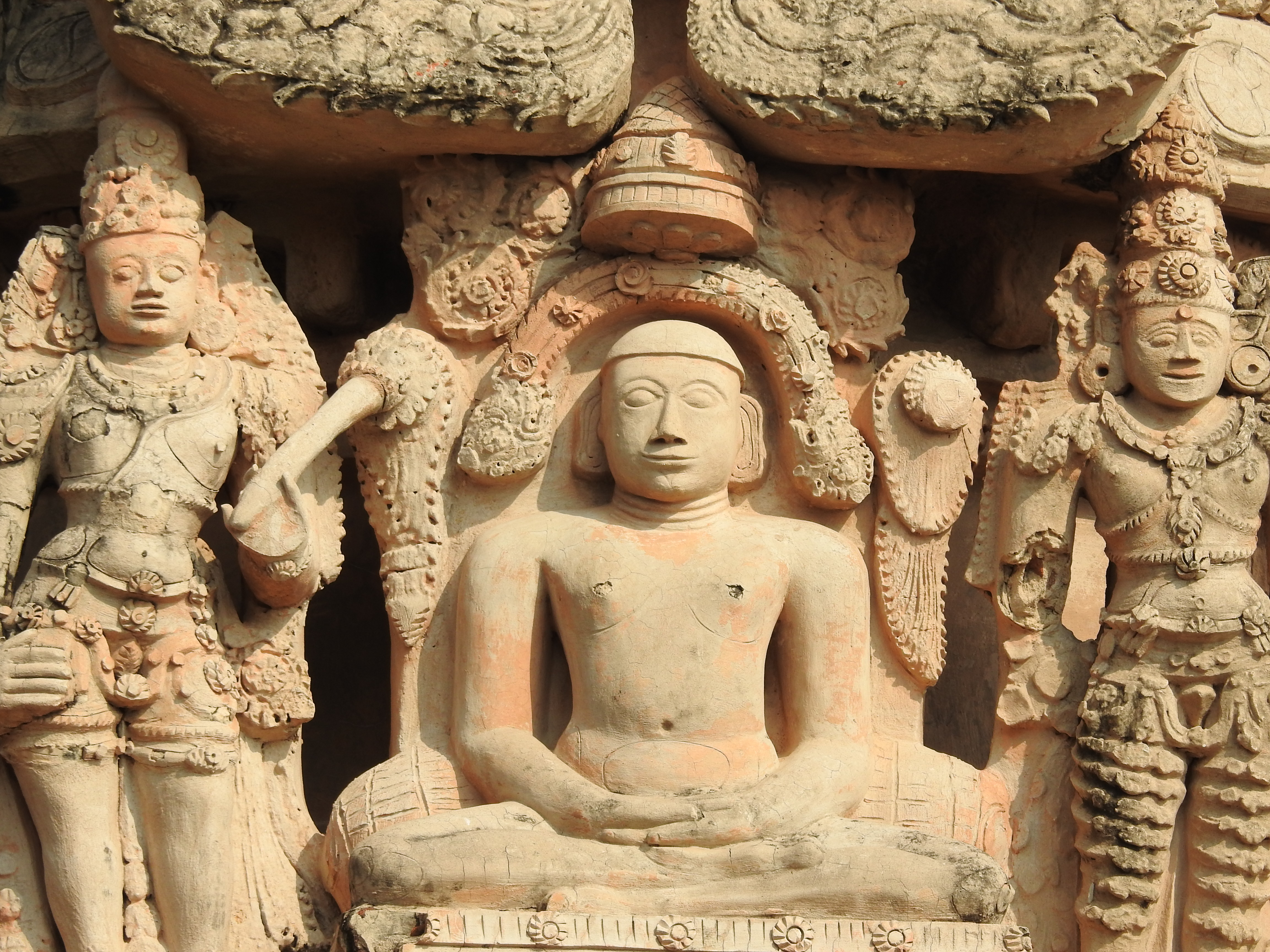
Detailed carvings at Tirumalai

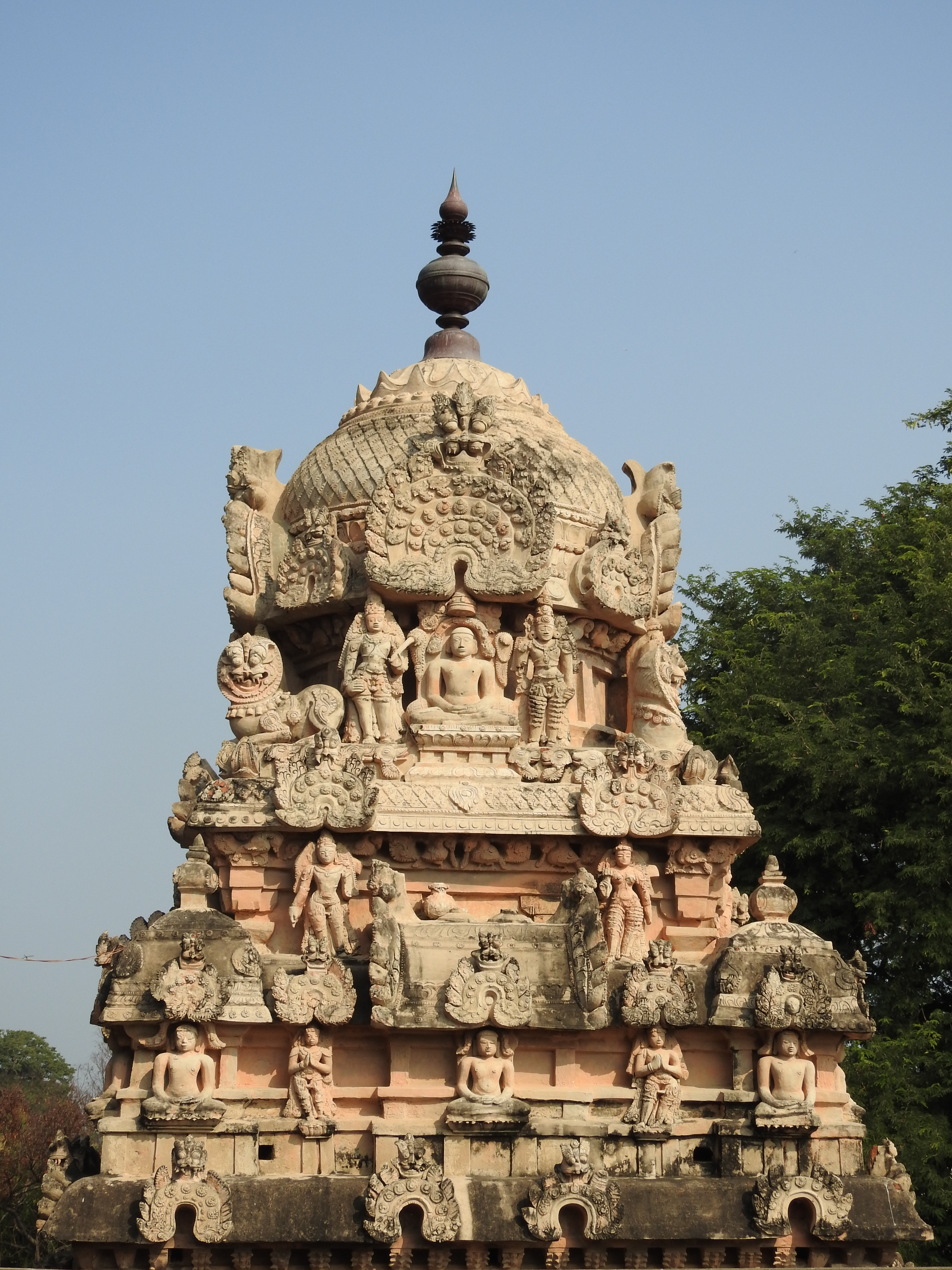
Shikhara with detailed carving, Kuntahavai Jain Temple

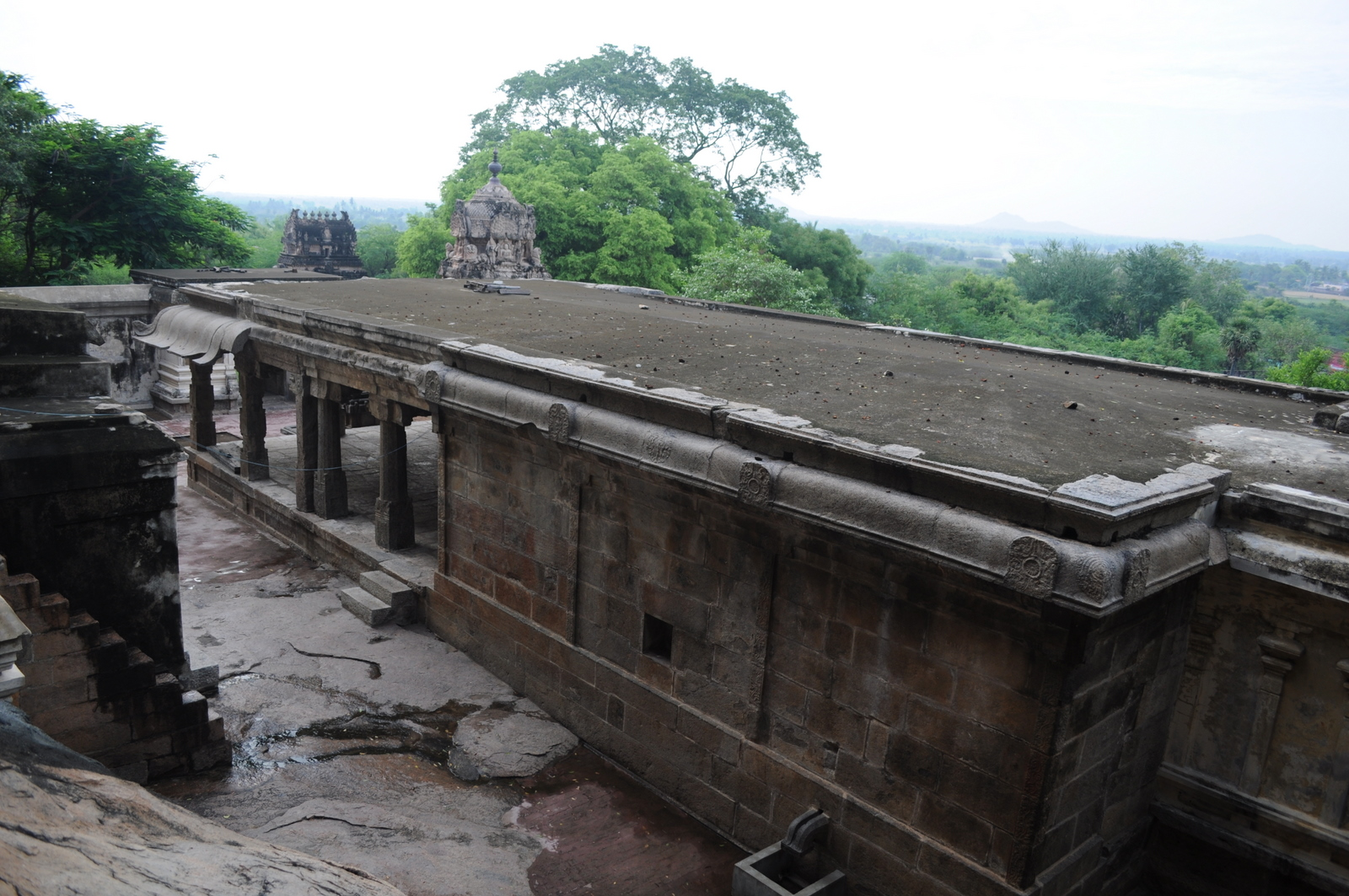
The Mahavira temple

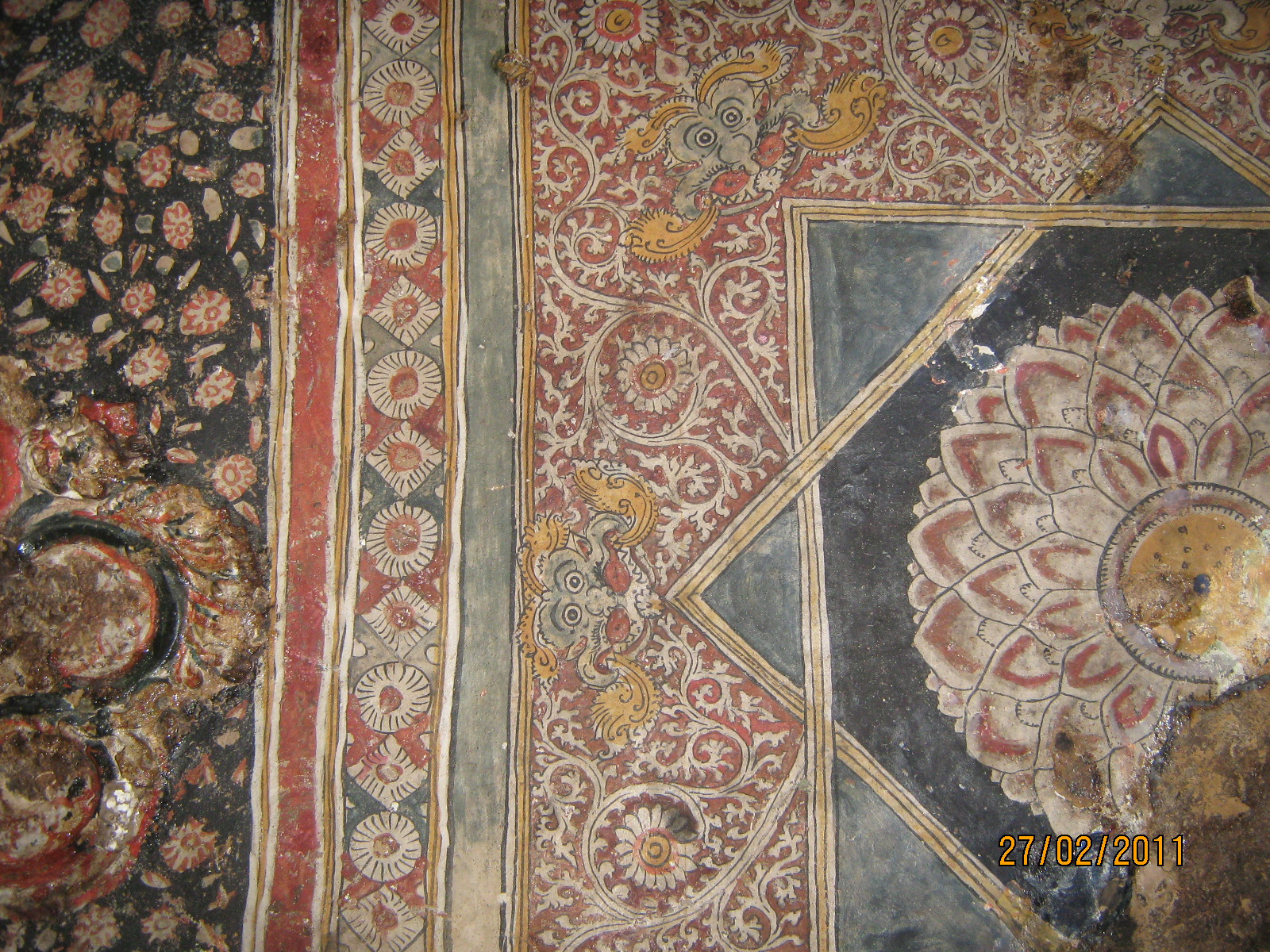
Paintings on ceiling

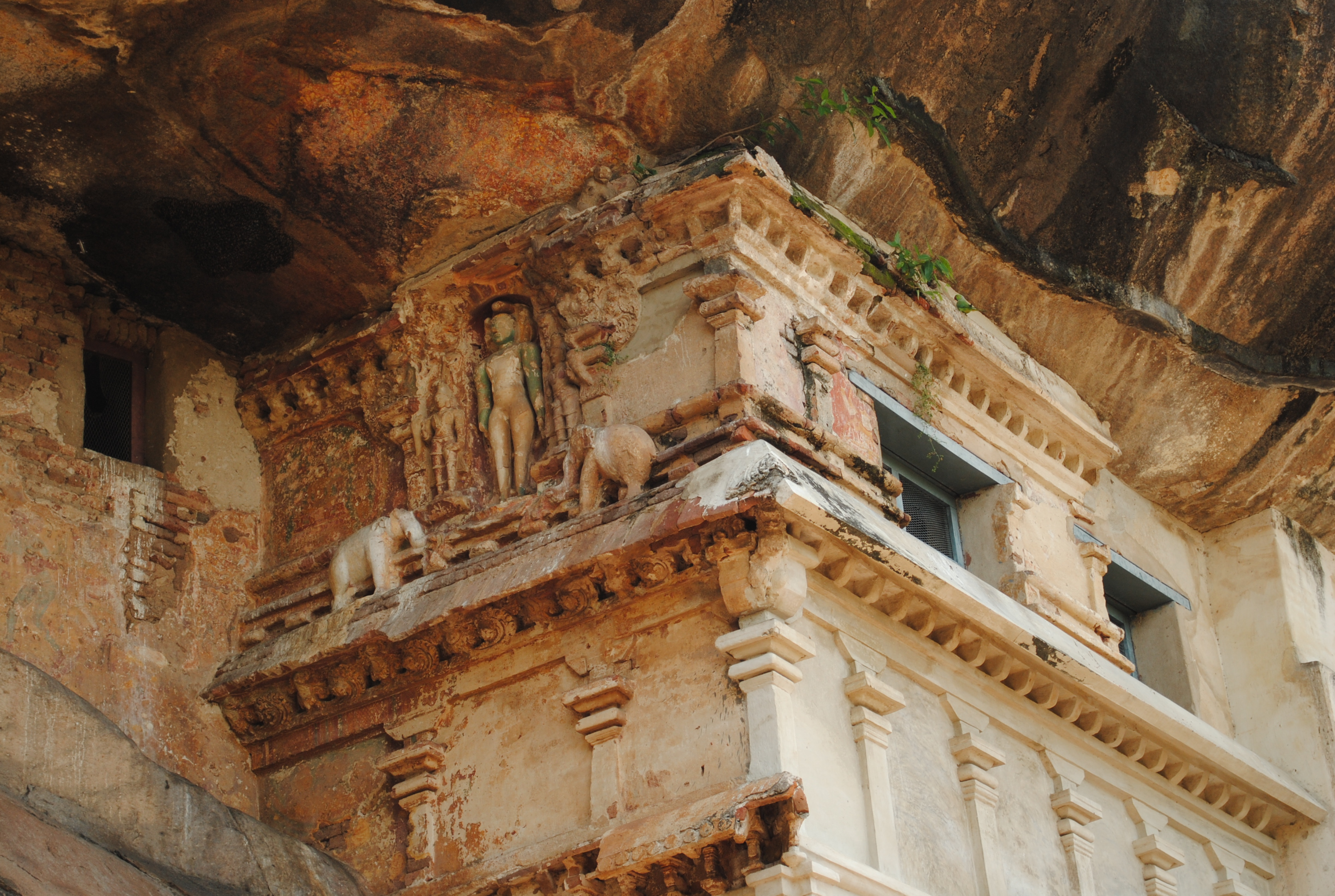
Cave structure

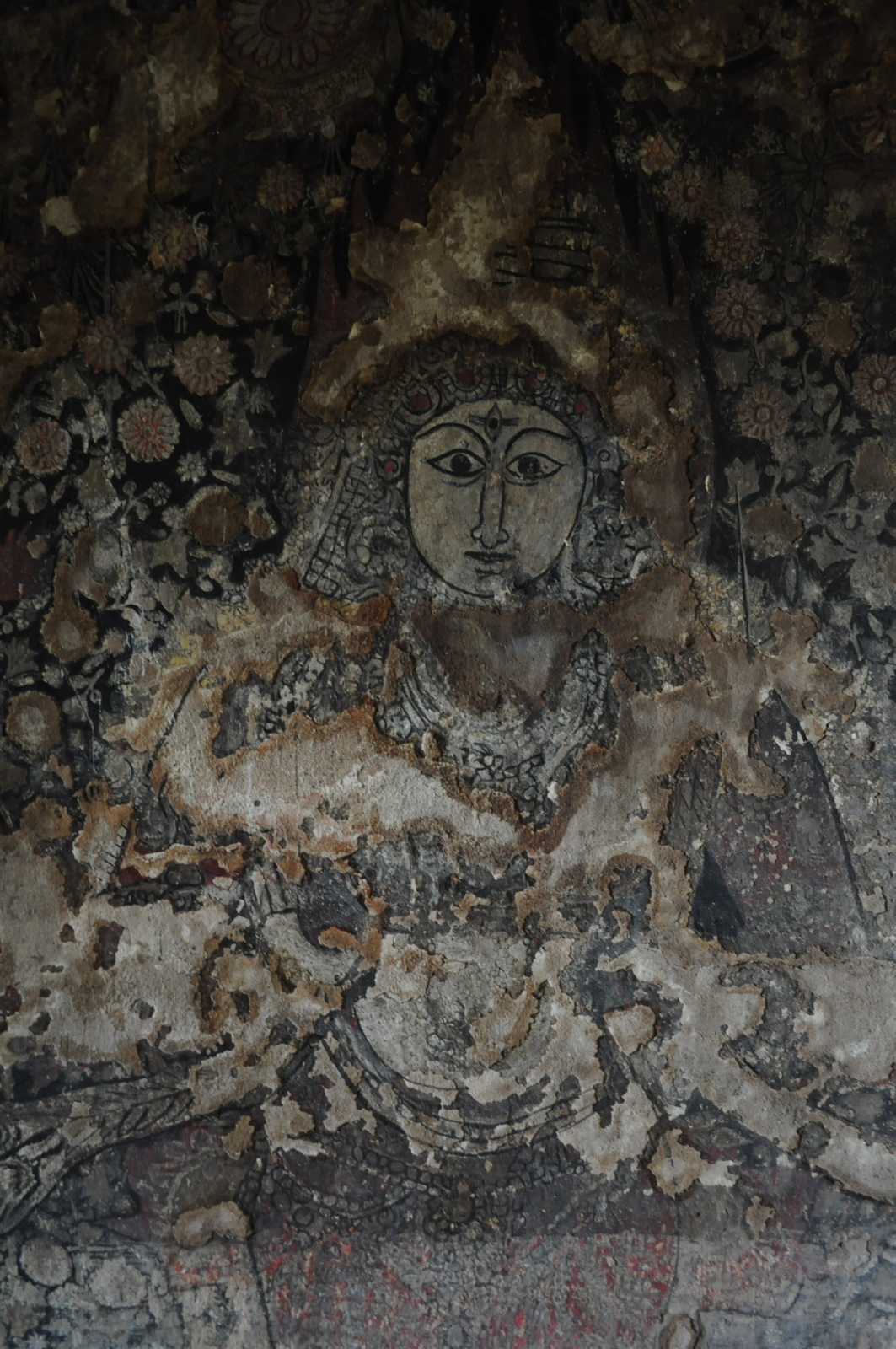
Painted figure in the cave

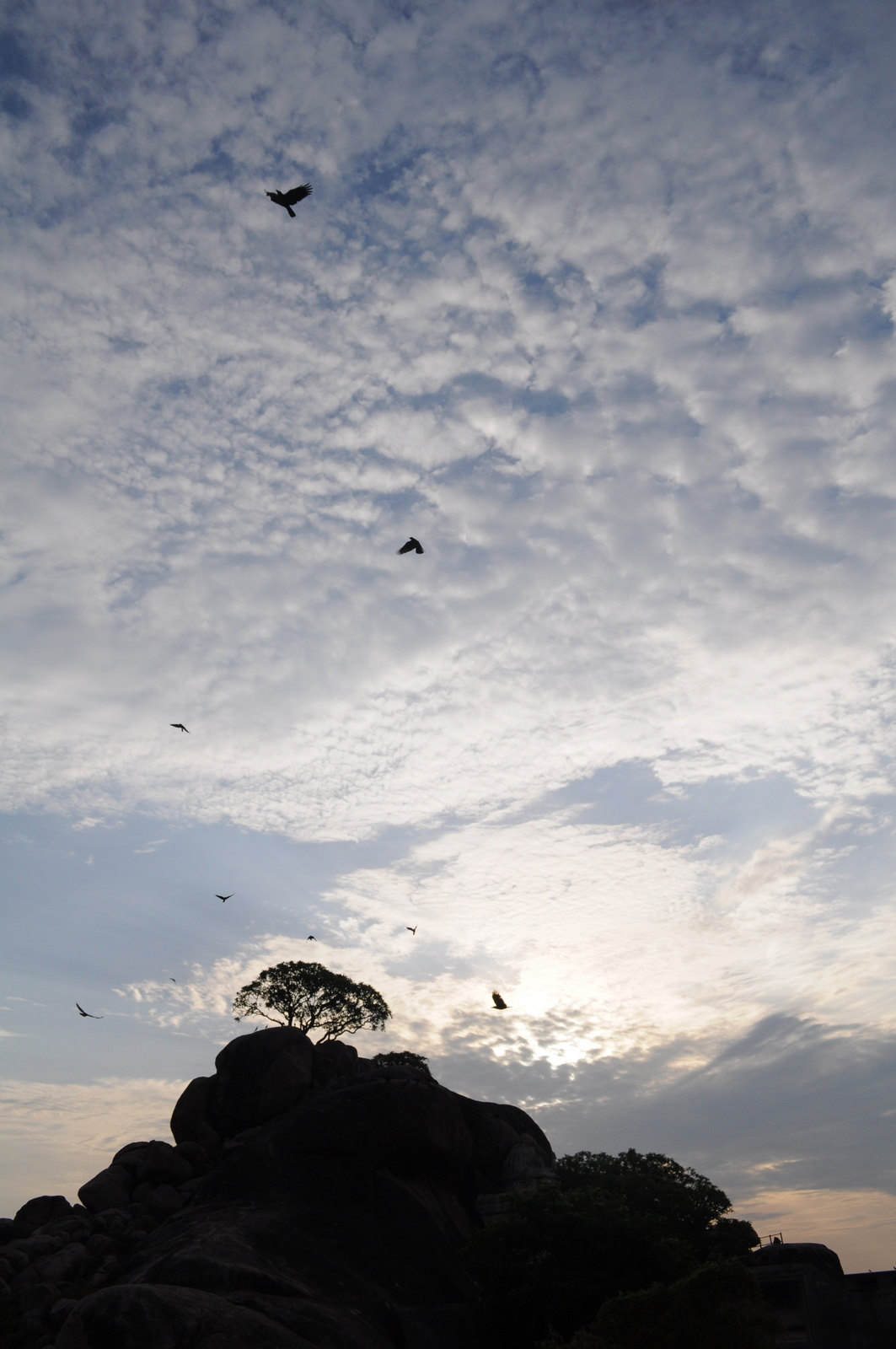
Peak at dawn

== See also ==
- Laxmisena
- Mel Sithamur Jain Math
- List of the tallest statues in India
