= Jain Matha, Shravanabelgola =

Jain Matha, Shravanabelagola
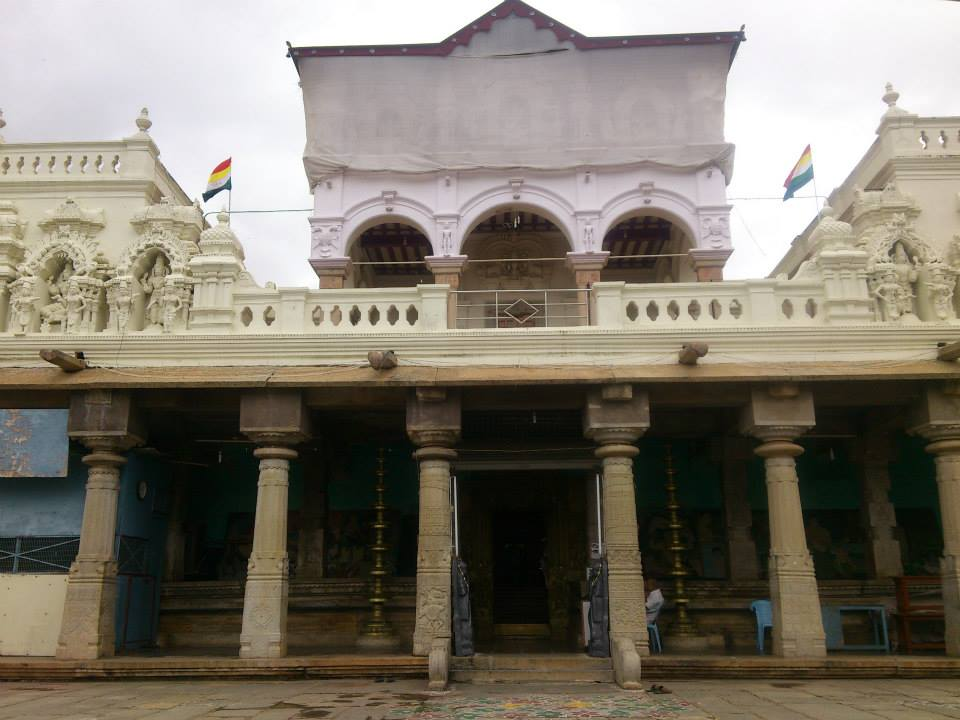
- Jain Matha

Religion
- Affiliation: Jainism
- Sect: Digambara
- Deity: Chandraprabha and Ambika
- Leadership: Bhattaraka

Location
- Location: Shravanabelagola, Hassan
- Interactive map of Jain Matha, Shravanabelagola
- Coordinates: 12°51′23.75″N 76°29′21.5″E

Architecture
- Style: Western Ganga
- Creator: Chavundaraya
- Established: 982 CE

Jain Matha, Shravanabelagola is a Digambara Matha (Jain monastic institution) and Bhattaraka seat located at Shravanabelagola in Hassan district, Karnataka, India. The institution developed into an important centre of Jain pontifical authority and religious learning in southern India.

The head of the matha traditionally bears the title Charukirti Bhattaraka. The institution has historically been associated with the Jain temples, religious establishments and manuscript tradition of Shravanabelagola.

== History ==
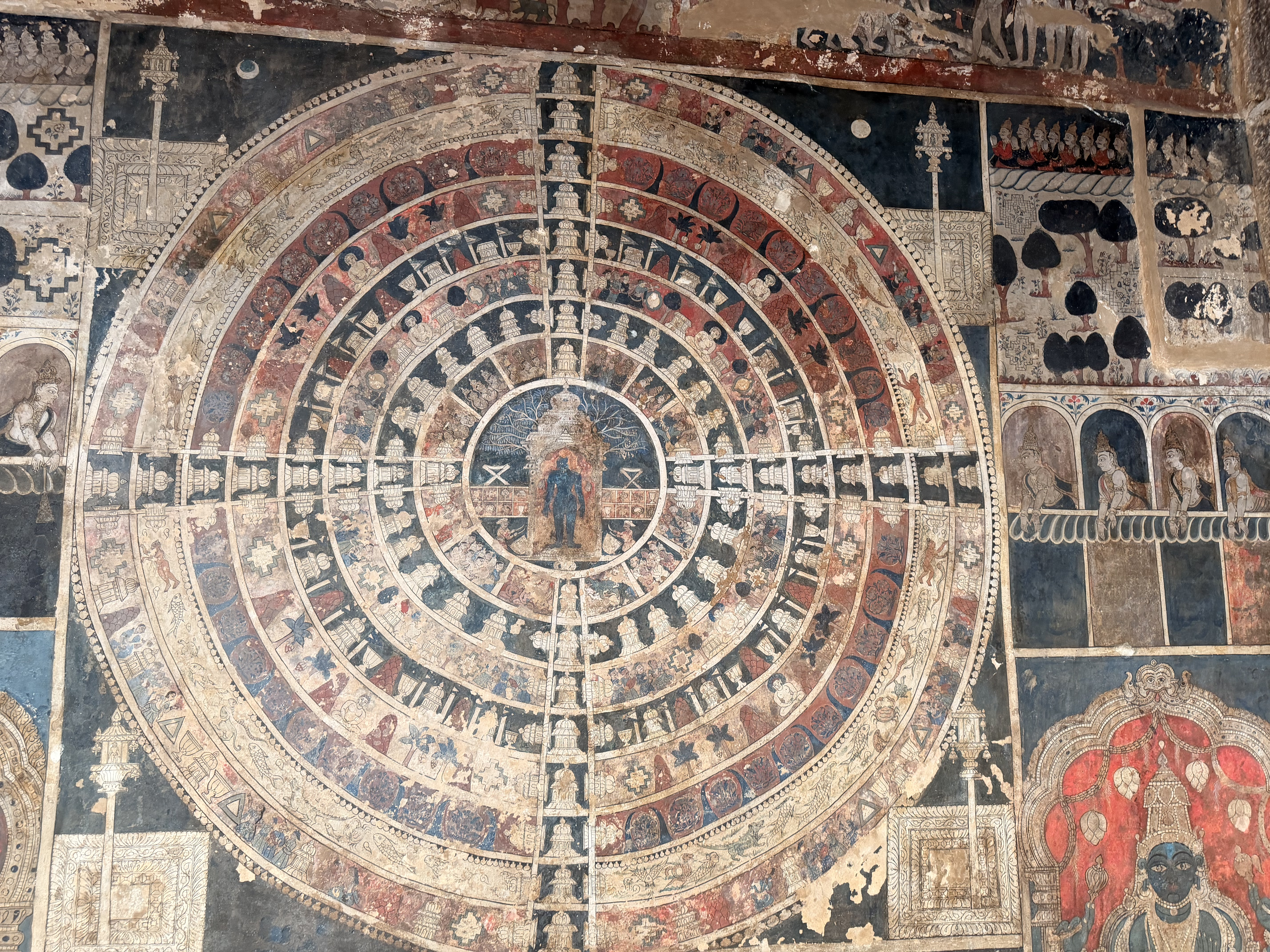
Jain cosmology painting

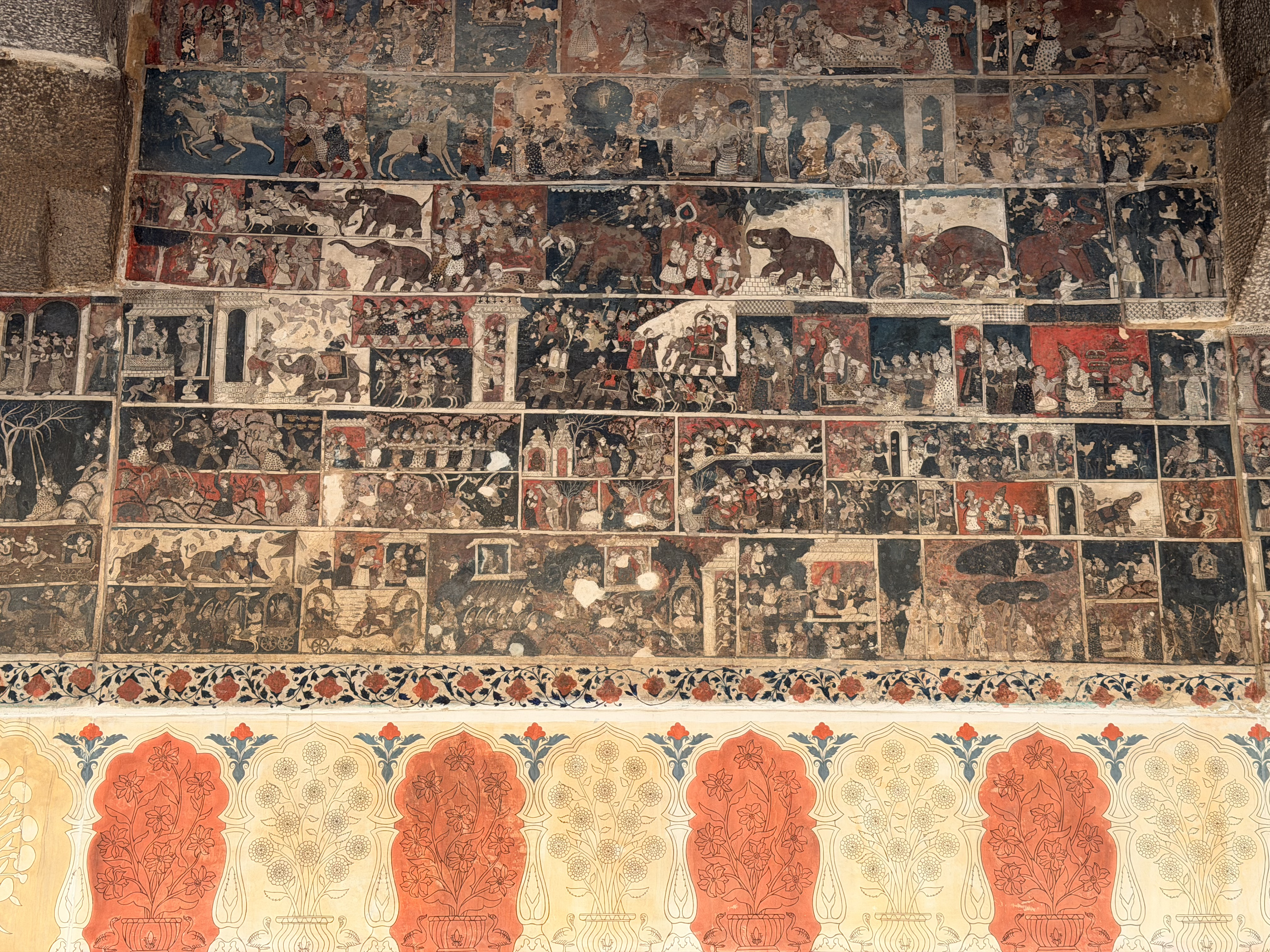
Jain stories painting

Shravanabelagola is one of the important Jain centers in Karnataka with history including numerous inscriptions document Jain monks, teachers, patrons and religious establishments over a period of several centuries. An inscription records the existence of a Jain matha at Shravanabelagola. The matha was founded in 982 CE by Chavundaraya, the general and minister of the Western Ganga ruler Marasimha II. Chavundaraya is also associated with the erection of the colossal Gommateshwara statue of Bahubali on Vindhyagiri Hill at Shravanabelagola.

The matha subsequently developed into an important centre as a seat of Jain Bhattaraka. The Jain matha at Maleyur was subordinate to the Shravanabelagola establishment.

== Bhattaraka tradition ==
The Jain Matha is a seat of the Bhattaraka tradition of Digambara Jainism. Unlike Digambara monks, Bhattarakas resided at permanent monastic institutions and were involved in religious instruction, temple administration, image consecration, manuscript preservation and the supervision of religious endowments. The Bhattarakas of Shravanabelagola traditionally bears the title Charukirti. The existence of the matha and its resident Jain Bhattarakas was independently documented in the 19th century. The medieval Shravanabelagola matha exercised influence over affiliated Jain institutions, including the matha at Maleyur.

== Religious and educational role ==
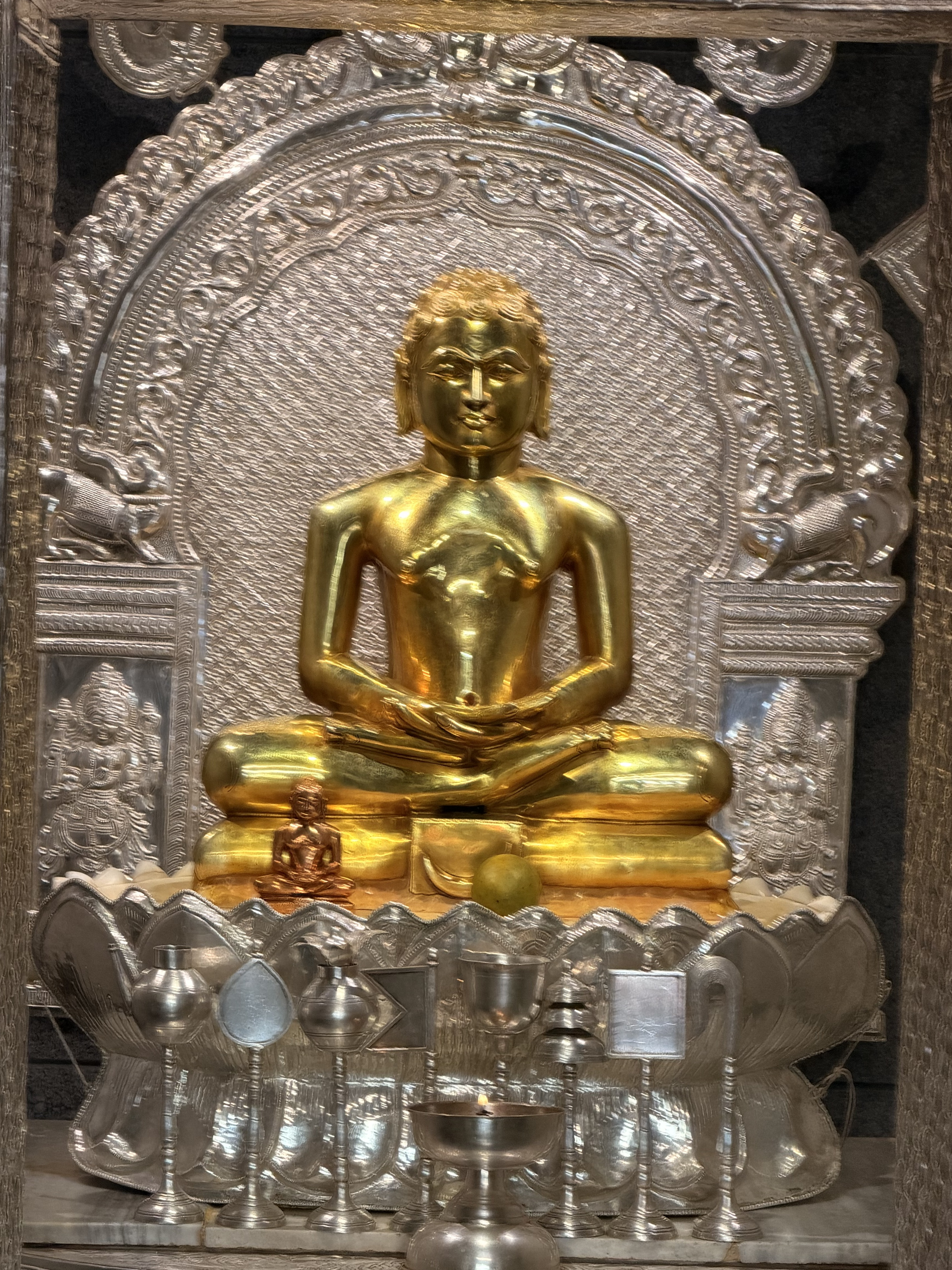
Chandraprabha

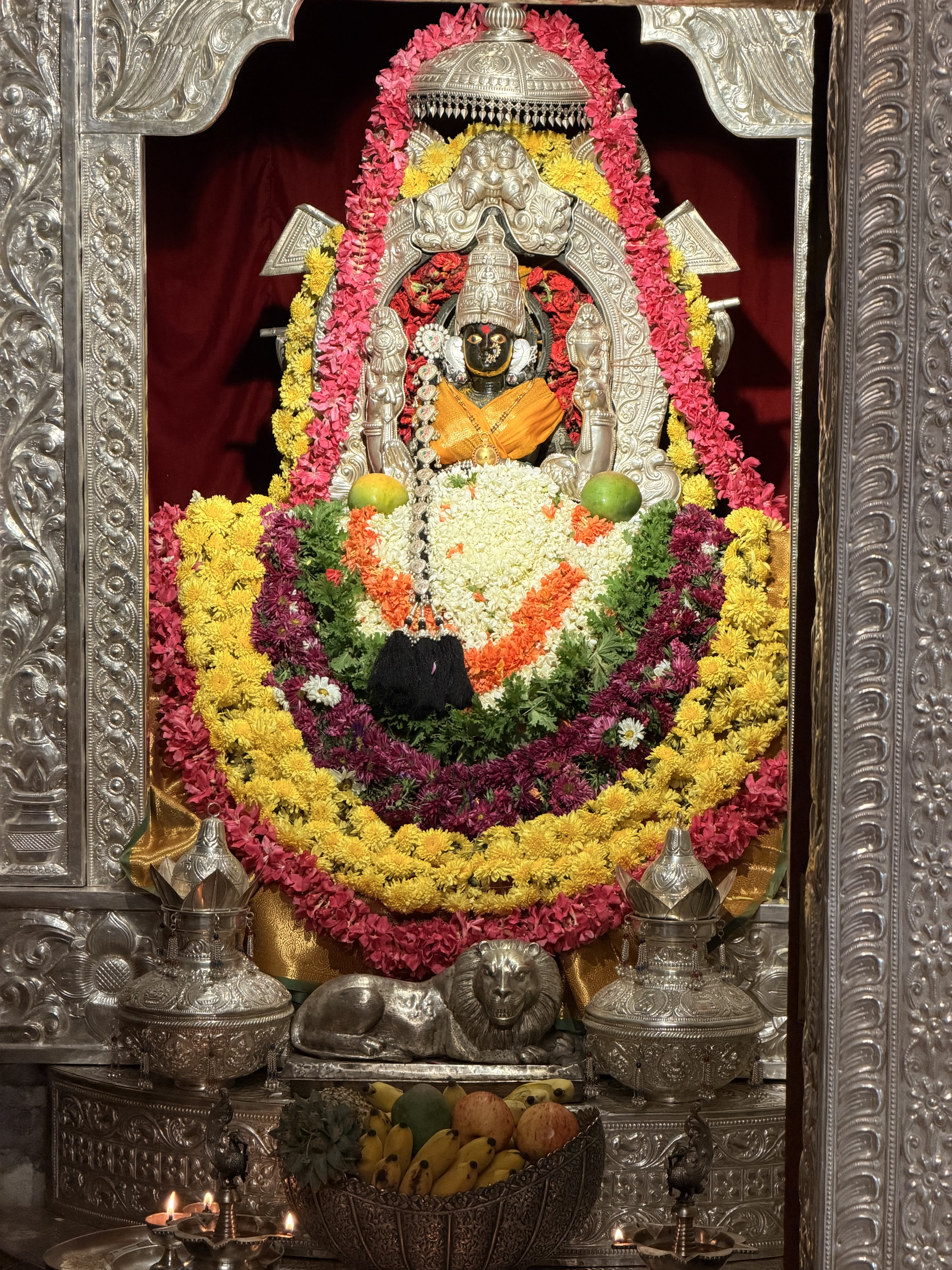
Ambika

Jain mathas in medieval Karnataka served as centres of religious instruction and scholarship. An inscriptions praises Jain teachers for learning in subjects including grammar, logic, Jain doctrine, literature, mathematics, medicine and other branches of knowledge. Shravanabelagola has been an important centre for Jain learning with numerous inscriptions at the site record Jain ascetics and teachers belonging to different monastic lineages. The matha responsibility includes the preservation and transmission of Jain religious literature. Shravanabelagola also preserves a manuscript repository.

== Manuscript collection ==
The Srimaccarukirti Panditacarya Jain Bhandar at Shravanabelagola is an important collection of Jain manuscripts. The existence of the collection reflects the traditional role of Jain mathas as centres for the preservation and study of religious and philosophical literature. The manuscript tradition of Shravanabelagola forms part of a larger network of Digambara Jain grantha bhandaras in Karnataka, including important collections at Moodabidri, Karkala and other historic Jain centres.

== Relationship with Shravanabelagola ==
The history of the matha is closely connected with the development of Shravanabelagola as a Jain pilgrimage and monastic centre. Shravanabelagola has two major sacred hills, Chandragiri and Vindhyagiri with presence numerous Jain temples, memorials and inscriptions. Chavundaraya, was founder of matha along with colossal Gommateshwara statue on Vindhyagiri. Muliple inscriptions in Shravanabelgola records the patronage of successive dynasties and officials, including the Western Gangas, Hoysalas, Vijayanagara rulers and the rulers of Mysore.

== Art ==
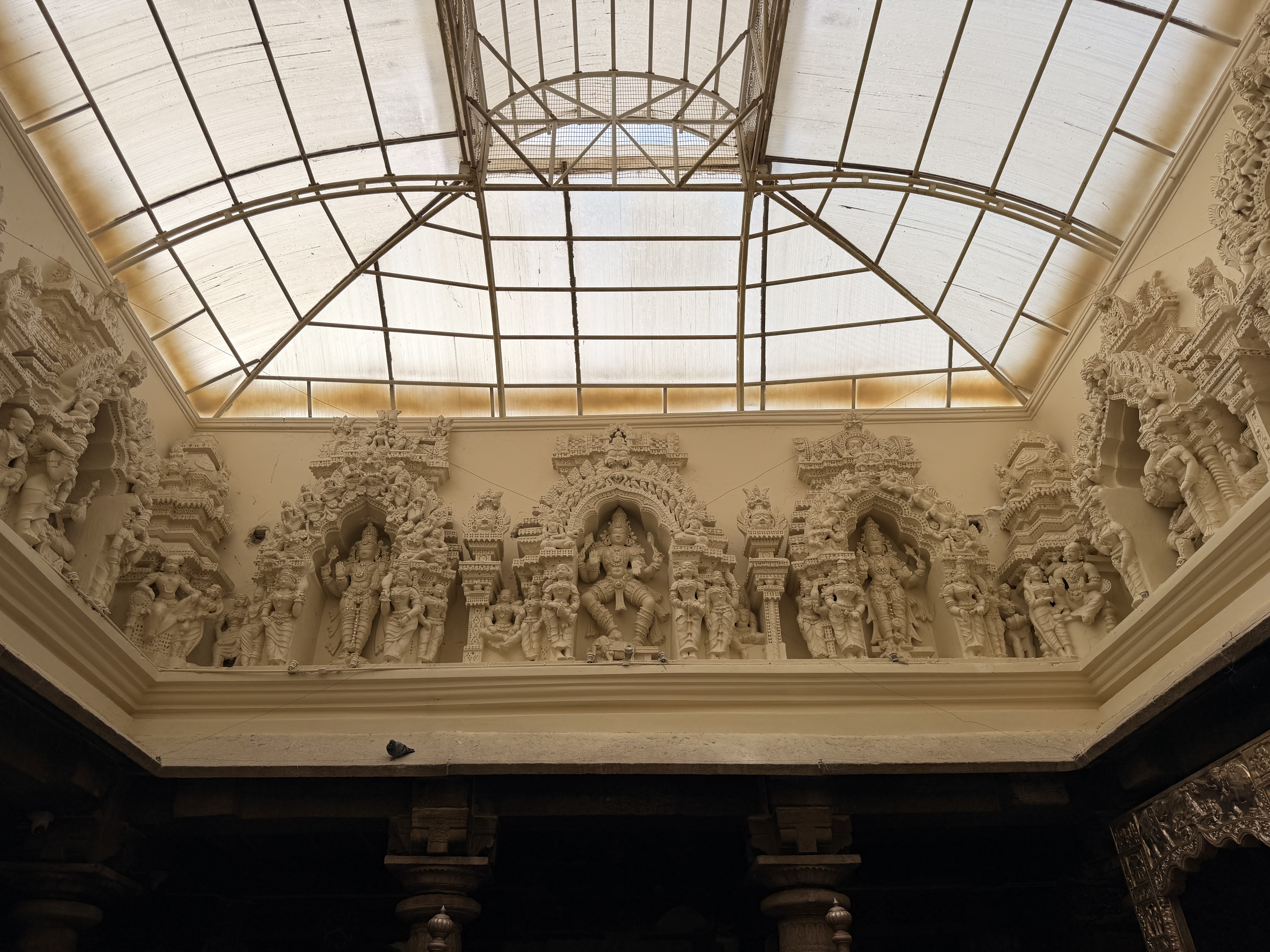
Carving of the sixteen devis

The Jain Matha contains paintings depicting subjects from Jain religious and cultural traditions. The mural paintings is an important artistic heritage of Shravanabelagola and include representations of religious figures, processions and narrative scenes. The matha also preserves an important collection of Jain bronze sculptures.

== Significance ==
The Shravanabelagola Jain Matha is significant in the institutional history of Jainism in Karnataka. The temple has been center for center authority, religious education and administration since medieval period. Its importance is also connected with the position of Shravanabelagola as a major Jain pilgrimage centre. The concentration of inscriptions, temples, memorial monuments and manuscript collections at the site provides extensive evidence for the long history of Jain religious institutions in the region.

The survival of the Bhattaraka institution and its manuscript repository represents the continuation of the monastic and scholastic traditions historically associated with Shravanabelagola.

== Gallery ==
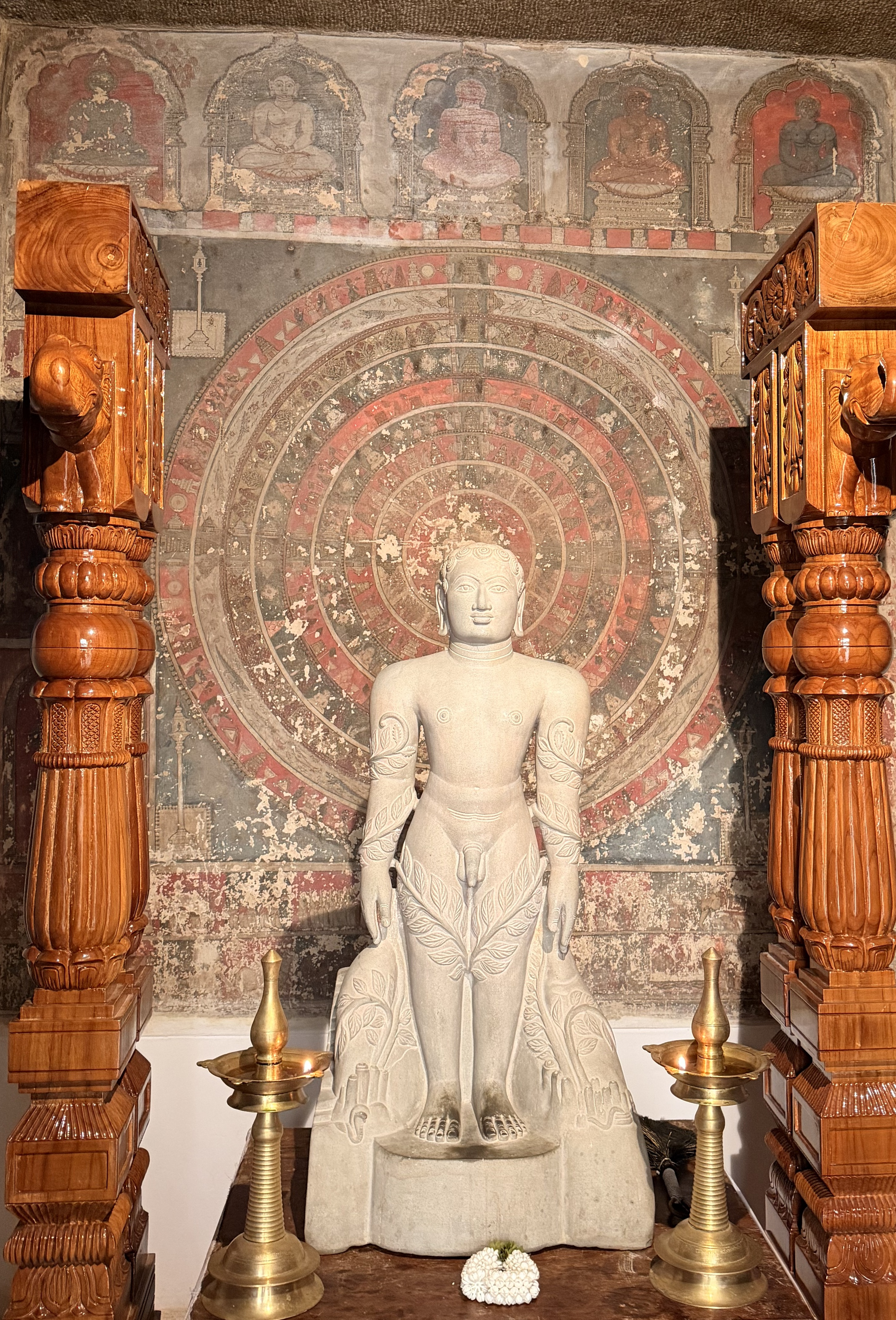
Bahubali with Jain cosmology painting

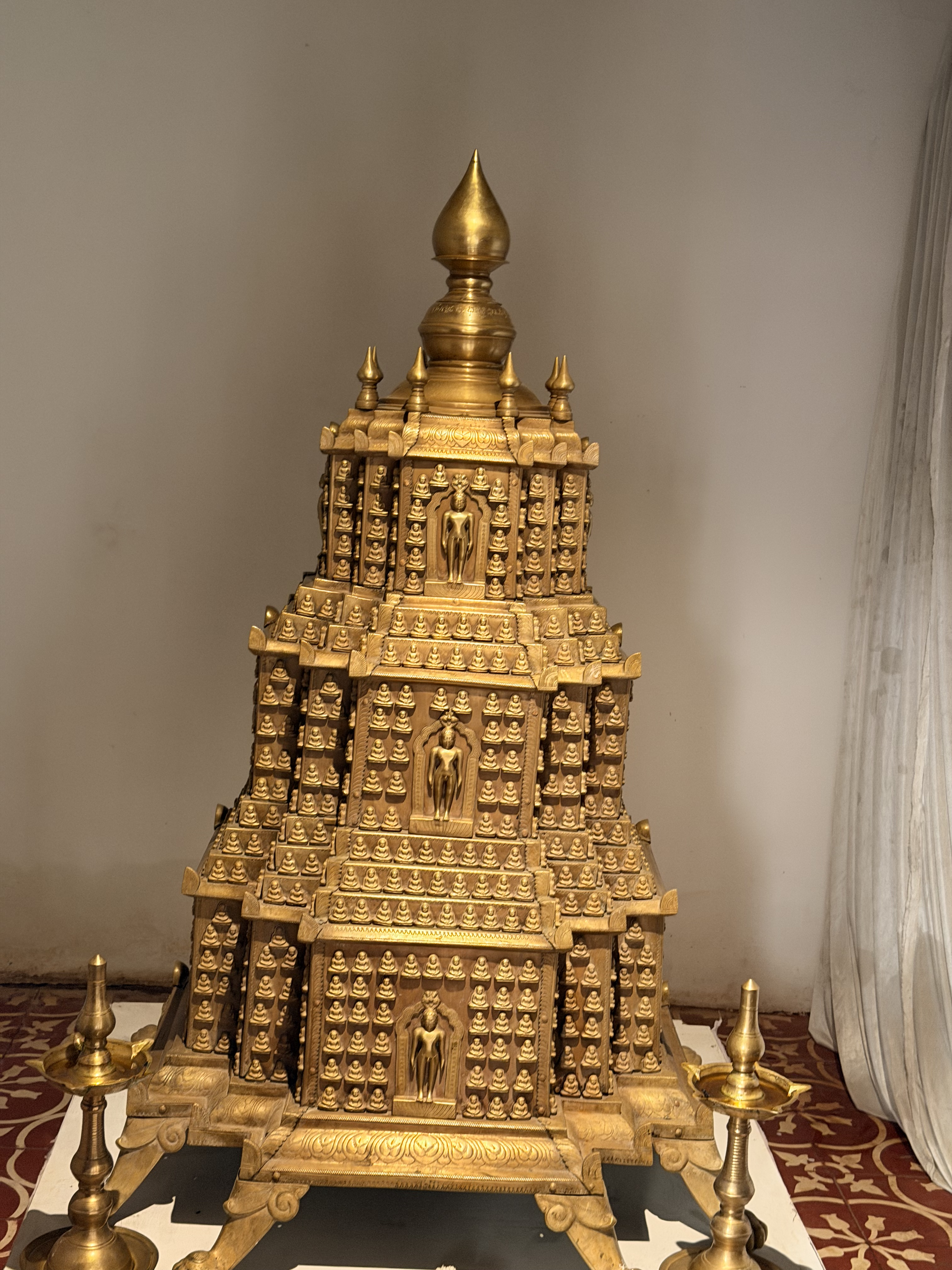
Sahastrakut Jinalaya

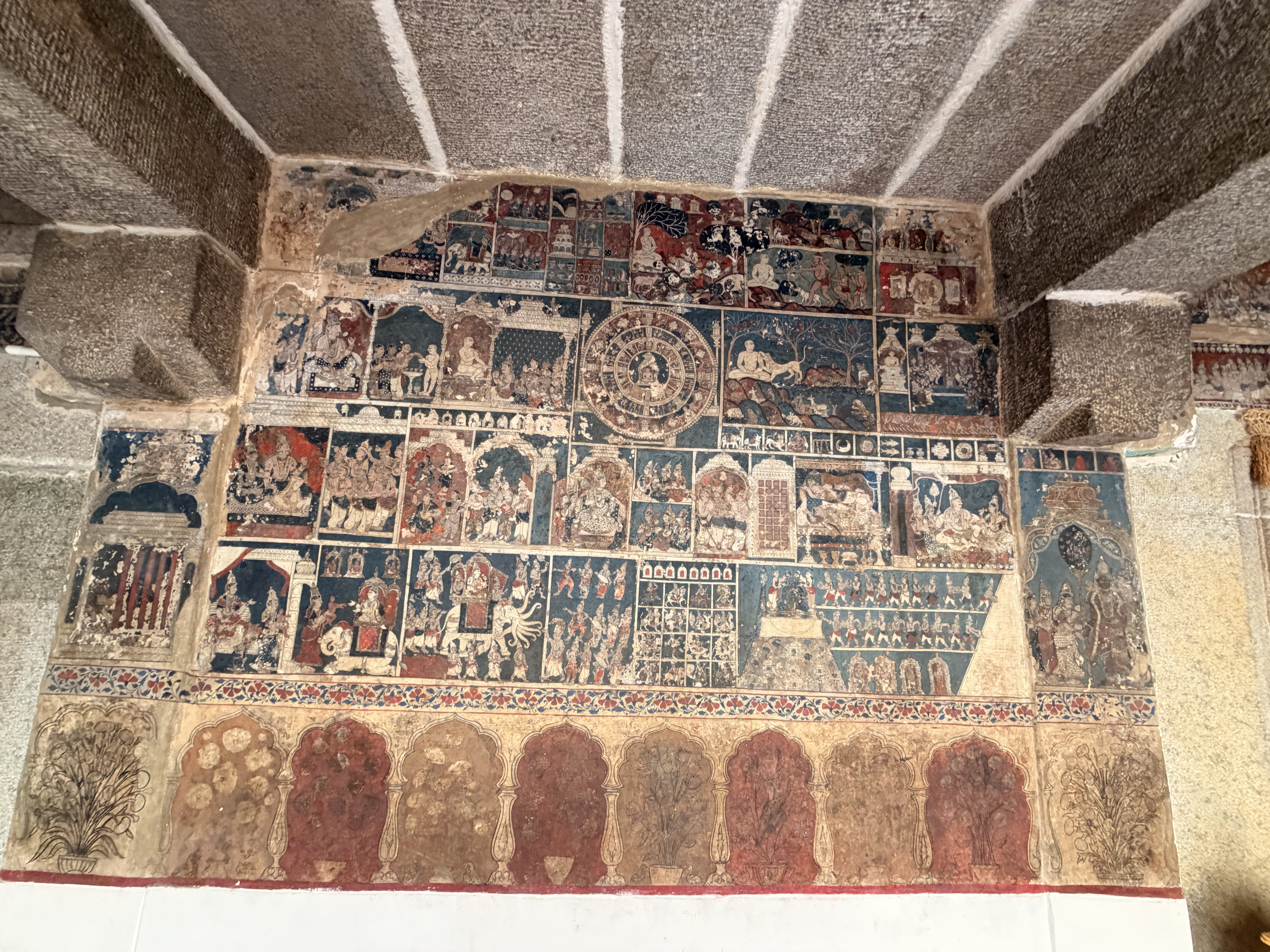
Jain stories painting

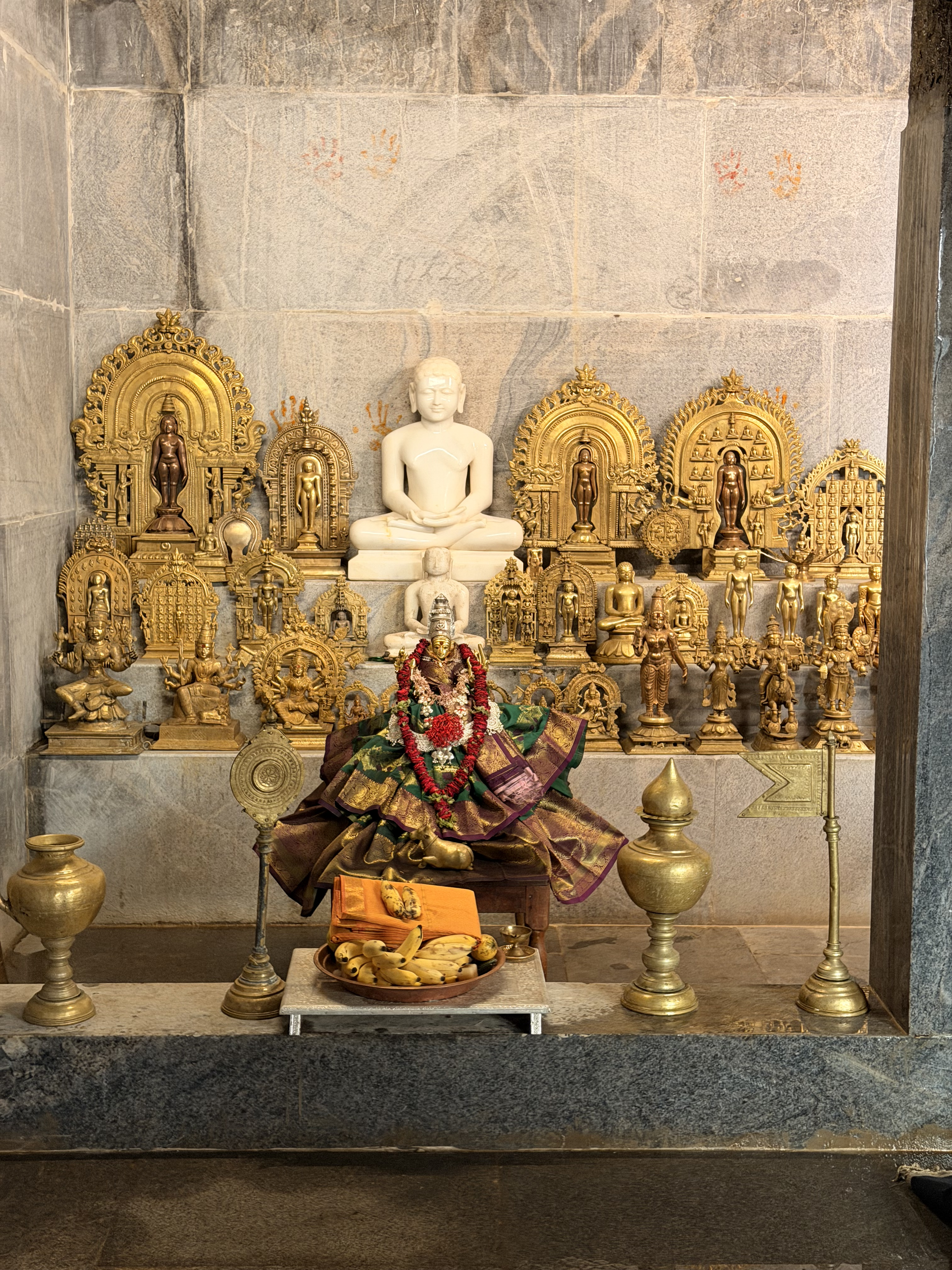
Vedi

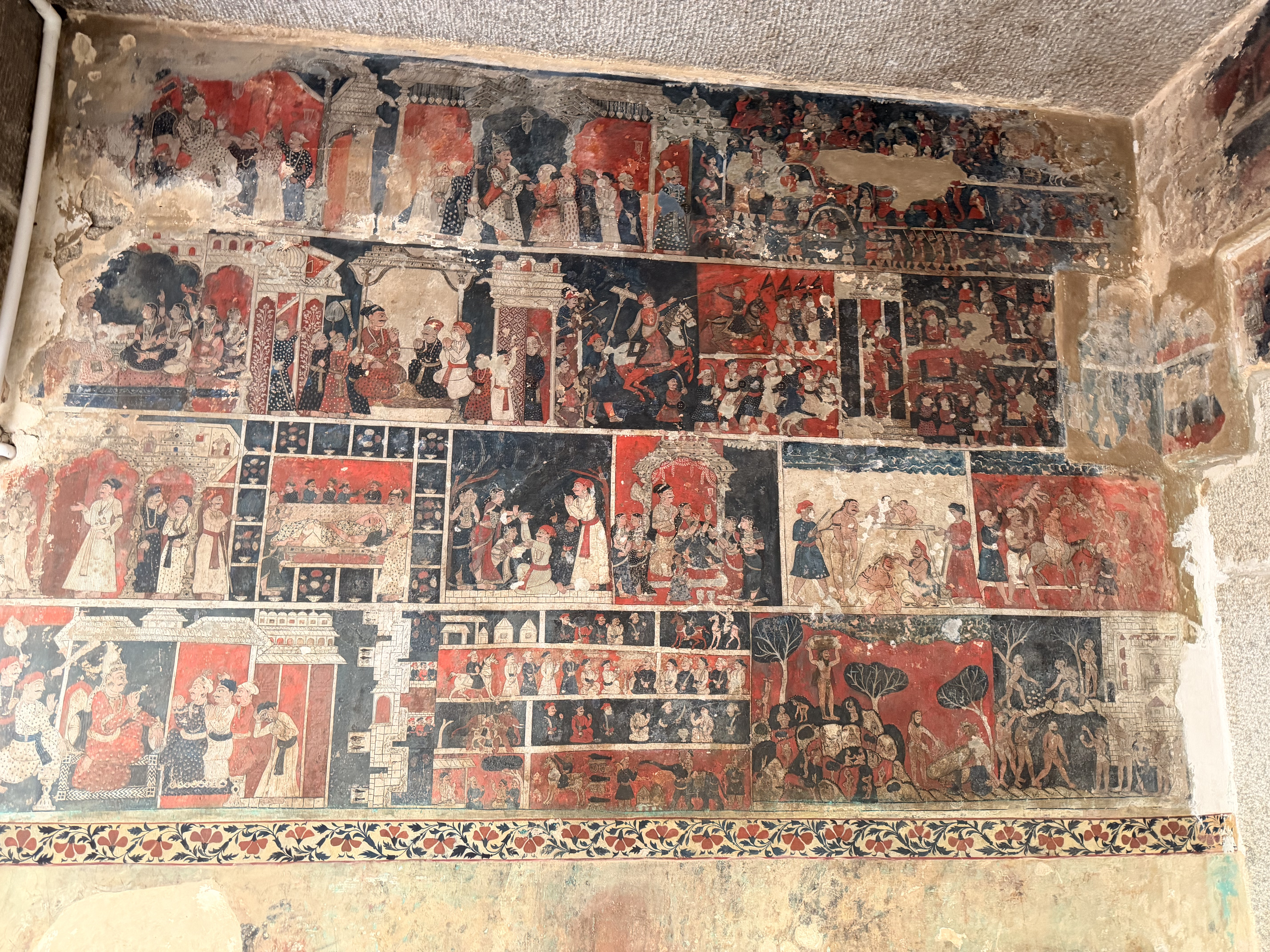
Jain stories painting

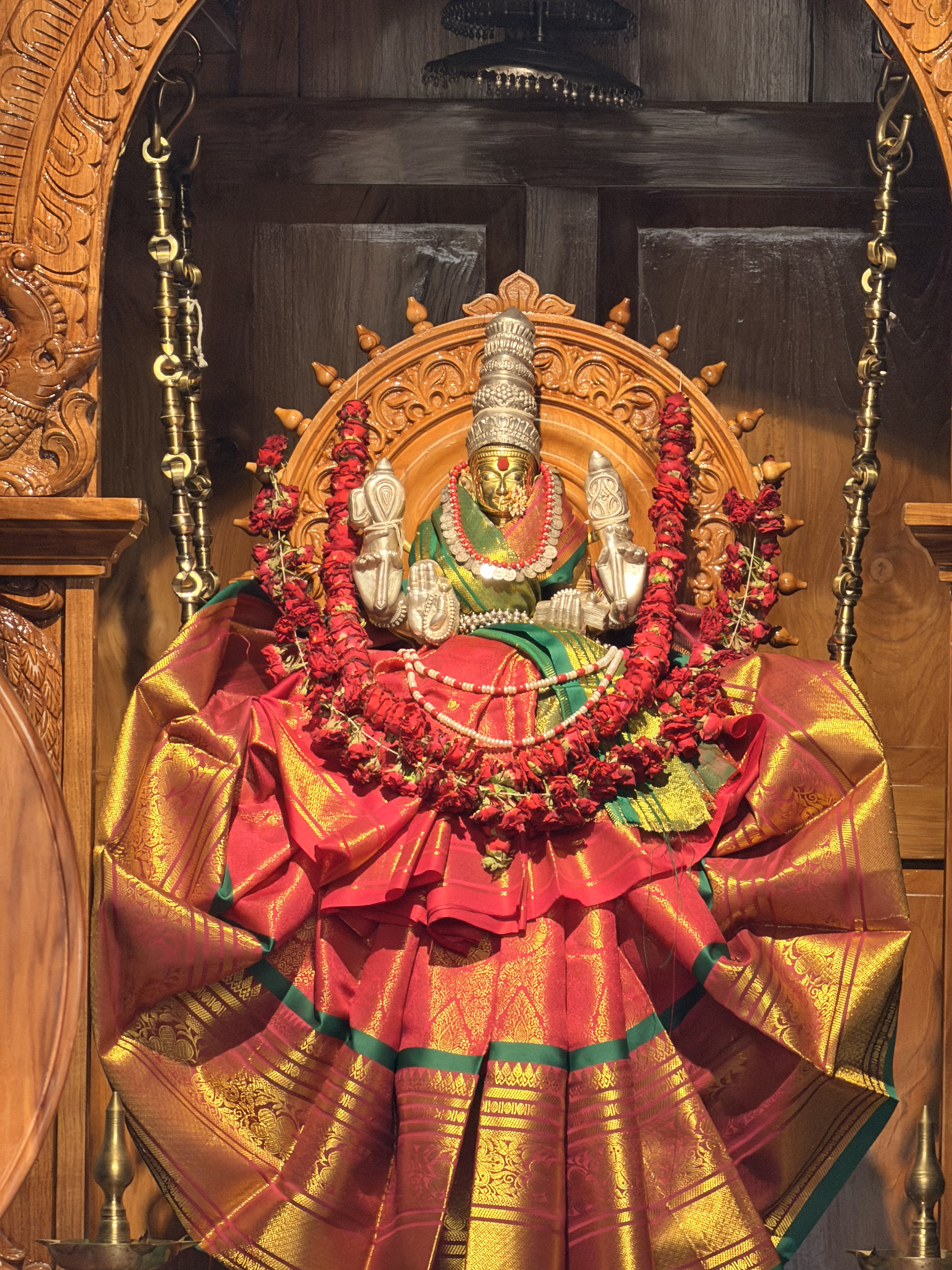
Ambika

== See also ==
- Arahanthgiri Jain Math
- Mel Sithamur Jain Math
