= Arahanthgiri Jain Math =

Jain matha in Tiruvannaamalai, Tamil Nadu, India

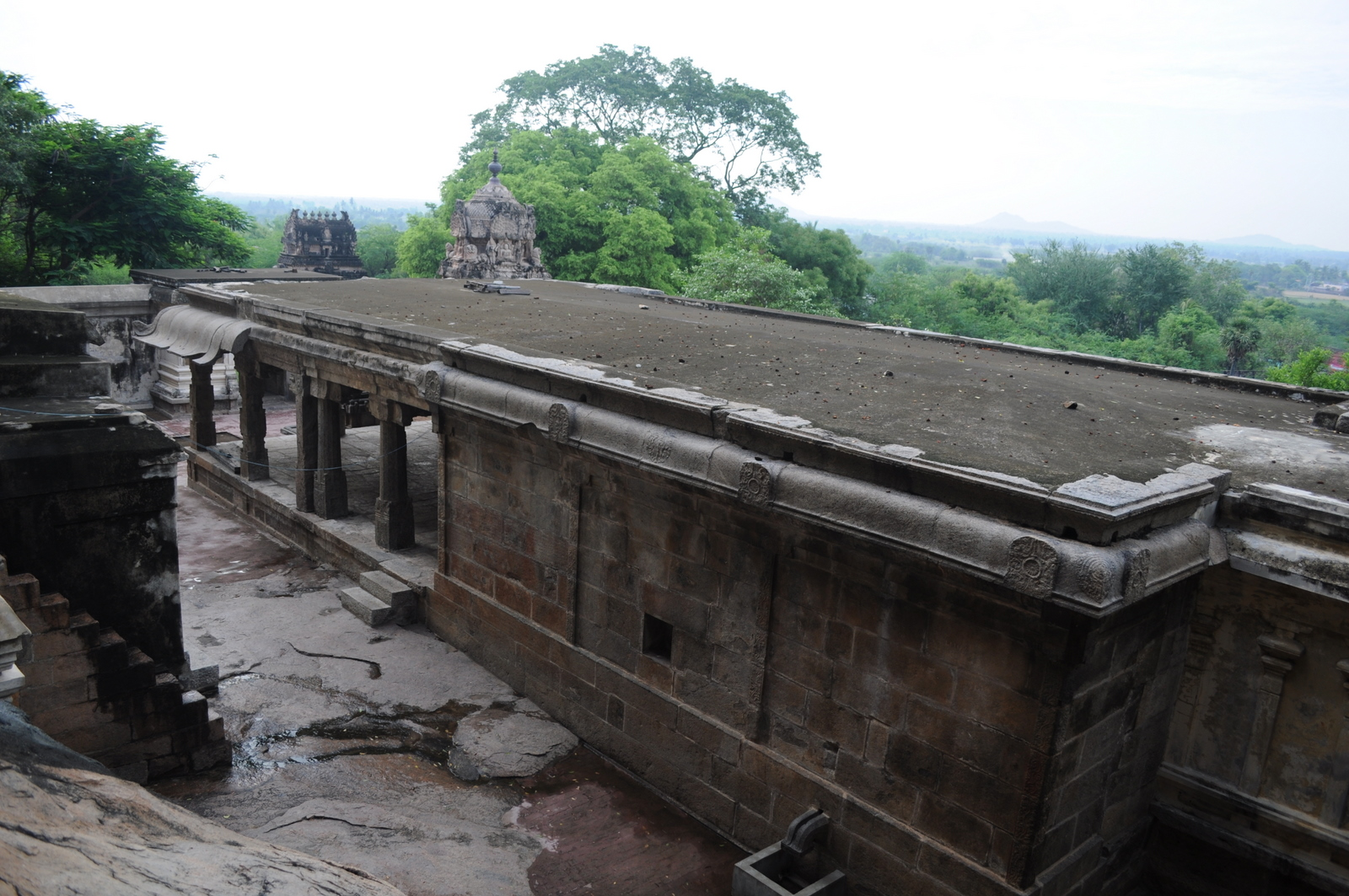
- Upper Temple Complex at Tirumalai

Religion
- Affiliation: Jainism
- Deity: Neminatha
- Festival: Mahavir Jayanti
- Governing body: Acharya Shri Akalanka Educational Trust
- Bhattaraka: Swasti Shri Dhavalakeerthi Swami

Location
- Location: Tiruvannaamalai, Tiruvannamalai district, Tamil Nadu
- Interactive map of Arahanthgiri Jain Math
- Coordinates: 12.22°N 79.07°E

Architecture
- Established: 322–185 BCE
- Temple: 4

Website
- www.akalanka-educational-trust.com

Arahanthgiri Jain Math is a Jain Matha established near Tirumalai in August 1998. The Math is headed by Bhattaraka Dhavalakeerthi.

== History ==
History of Arahanthgiri Jain Math starts from the period of 322–185 BCE as the Last 'Shrutkevali' Bhadrabahu stayed there to practice meditation and "Swadhyaya" along with 8000 other saints. The Village Thirumalai where this Jain Math is located is also known as Arhatsugiri or Arihantgiri. This more than 2,000-year-old temple is near Tirumala. The complex is now managed by the Archaeological Survey of India.

== Main temple ==
The 16-meter Neminath Idol is on the top of the hill, which has 140 steps. This idol is believed to dated from the 12th century. A very famous south Indian movie has been shot around the theme of Neminatha. There are various caves in this Jain Math, and it has hundreds of religious books.

== See also ==
- Tirumalai (Jain complex)
- Laxmisena
- Mel Sithamur Jain Math
- Jain Matha, Shravanabelgola
