= Mel Sithamur Jain Math =

Religious center in Tamil Nadu, India

Jina Kanchi Jain Math
- ஜின காஞ்சி சமண மடம்
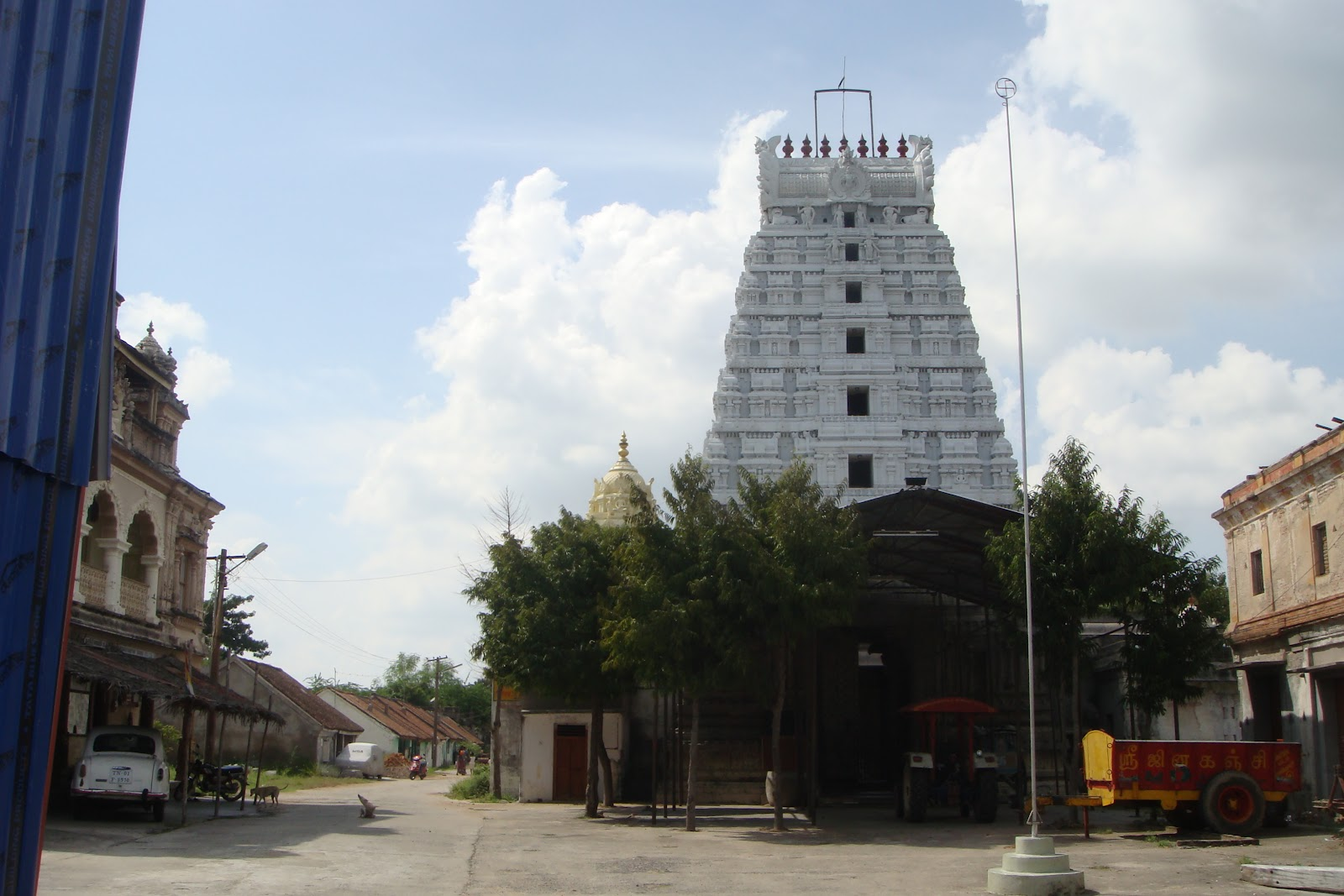
- Main temple at the Jina Kanchi Jain Math

Religion
- Affiliation: Jainism
- Sect: Digambar
- Deity: Parshvanatha, Malinatha
- Festival: Mahavir Jayanti
- Bhattaraka: Swasti Shri Laxmisena Swami

Location
- Location: Gingee, Villupuram district, Tamil Nadu
- Interactive map of Jina Kanchi Jain Math
- Coordinates: 12°16′11″N 79°30′51″E

Website
- jinakanchi.com

Jina Kanchi Jain Math, Melsithamur, is a Jain Matha that is located near Gingee, Villupuram district, Tamil Nadu, India.

It is the primary religious center of the Tamil Jain community. It is headed by the primary religious head of this community, Bhattaraka Laxmisena Swami.

== History ==
The Tiruvannamalai and Villupuram areas have been an important centre of Jainism since ancient times. Historically, there was a Jain Math at Kanchipuram but it was shifted to its current location here. Venkatappa Nayak (1570-1600) is said to have given permission during his reign to build this Sittamur Jain Temple. Later, in 1860 CE, a Jain official in the Madras Provincial Services, Sri Baliah, dismantled several stone-pieces including the great stone elephants from the Gingee Venkataramana Temple, to make edifices in the Sittamur Jain temple. Among them the great stone elephants placed at the foot of the Termutti (car-stand), are noteworthy.

== Overview ==
There are two temples and one of them is dedicated to Parshvanatha. The other temple is dedicated to Malinatha and it was originally a boulder containing rock-cut images of Bahubali, Parsvanatha, Adinatha, Mahavira and Ambika yakshi. These images were carved in the 9th century CE.

Parshvanatha temple or Raja Gopuram is a seven storeyed tower with a total height of more than 70 feet. Images of tirthankaras are carved on temple walls. Main idol of Parsvanatha temple is a black colored 14 feet idol of Parsvanatha in Padmasan posture. The 52 feet manastambha in the temple is a monolith.

Malinatha Temple is also known as Thiruvooram Palli or Kattam Palli. The carvings of Tirtankaras Bahubali, Parshvanatha, Adinath bagavan, Mahavira and Yakshi Dharma Devi belonging to the 7th century sculptured on a single rock here is a testimony to the workmanship of those days.

== Other Temples ==
- Gingee Jain Temple: Gingee Jain Temple is a very ancient and famous temple. This temple is dedicated to Adinatha.
- Vilukkam Temple: This is a small temple dedicated to Adinatha.
- Thayanur Temple: This temple is built more than 1000 years ago. This temple is dedicated to Mahaveer Swami. The other deities you can find in this temple are Yakshi Padmavati, Yakshi Dharmadevi, Brahma Devar and Navagraham mandap.
- Kolianur Temple: The presiding deity in this temple is Adinath Bhagwan who is seated in a Padmasana posture. Stone carved idols of other deities in the temple include Padmavathi Yakshi and Navagraham.

== Location ==
The Math is located 20 km off Tindivanam and 10 km east of Gingee.

== Photo gallery ==
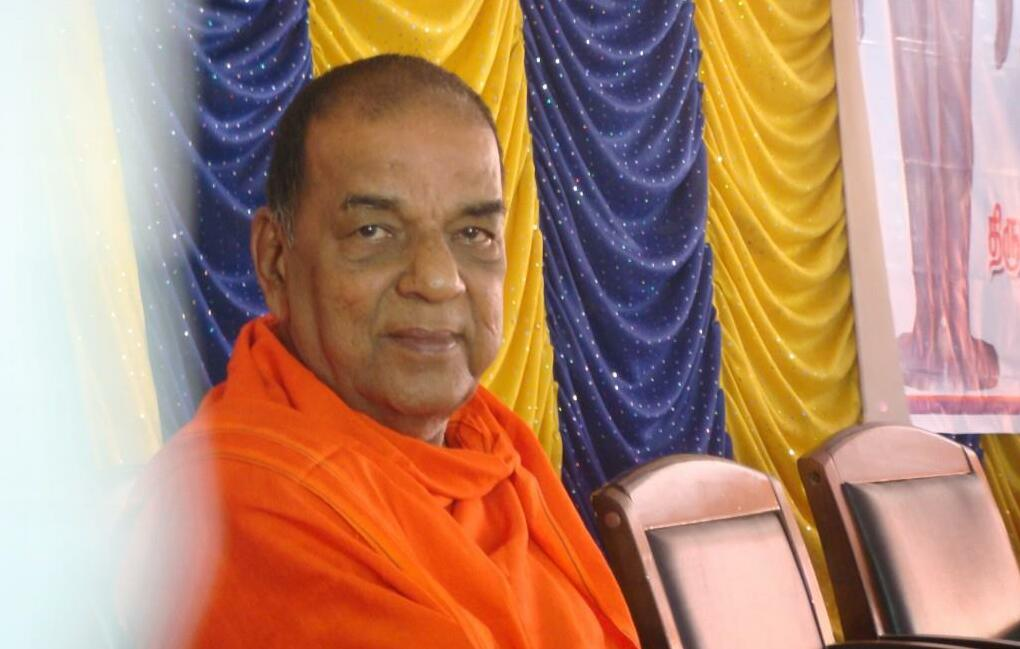
Bhattaraka Laxmisena resides at this Math

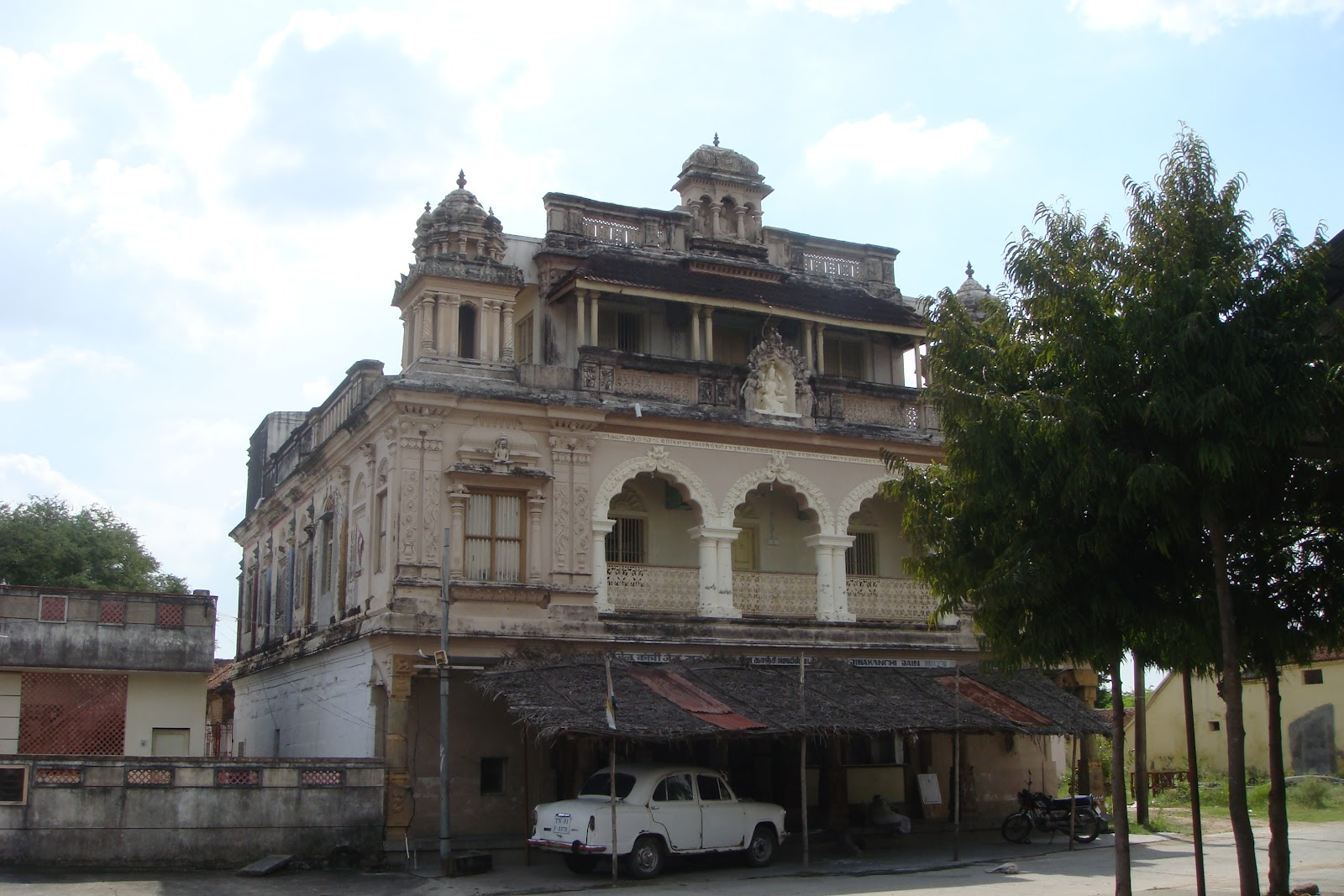
Residence of Bhattaraka Laxmisena at the Mel Sithamur Jain Math

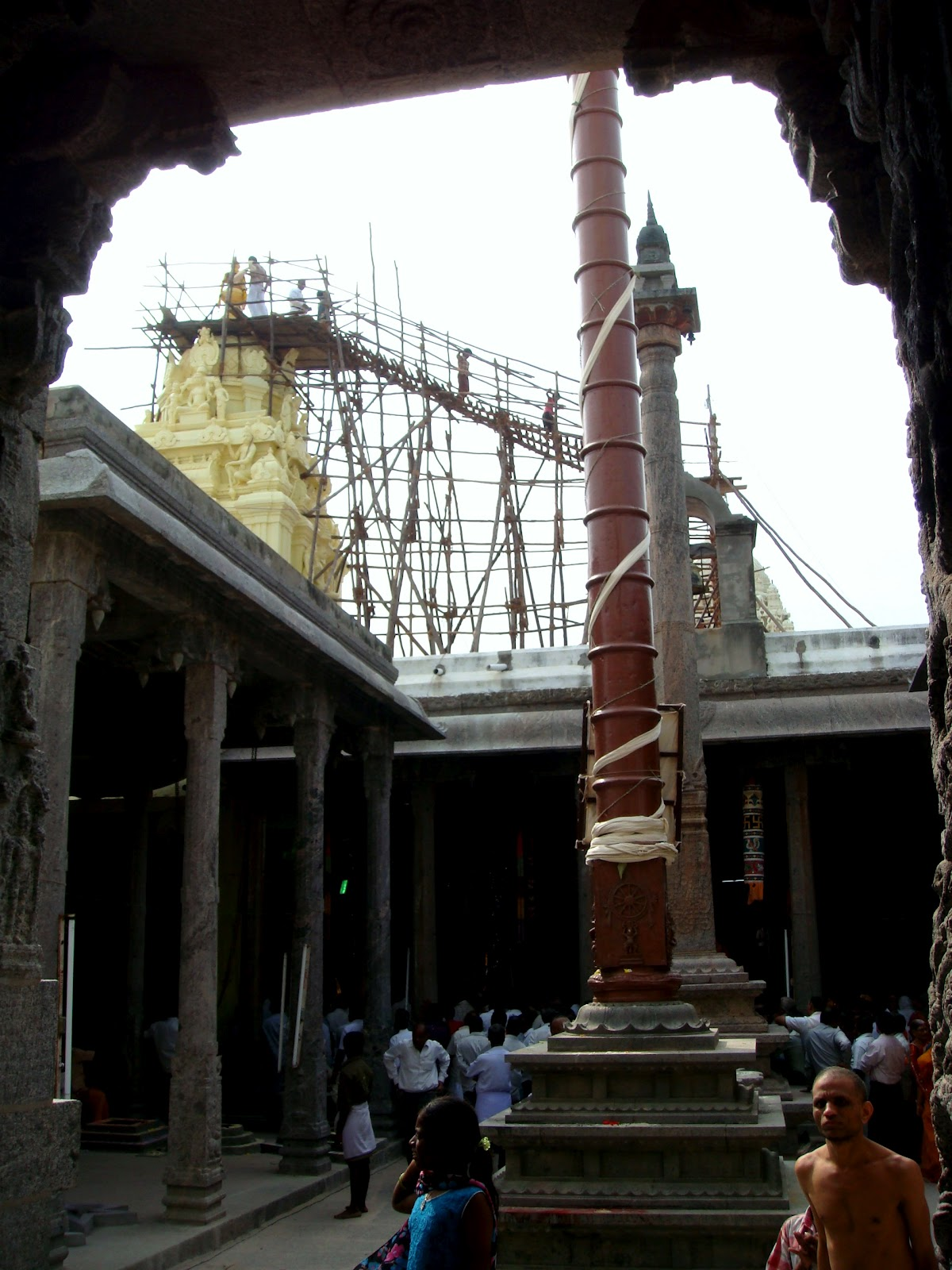
Courtyard of the main temple during a religious festival

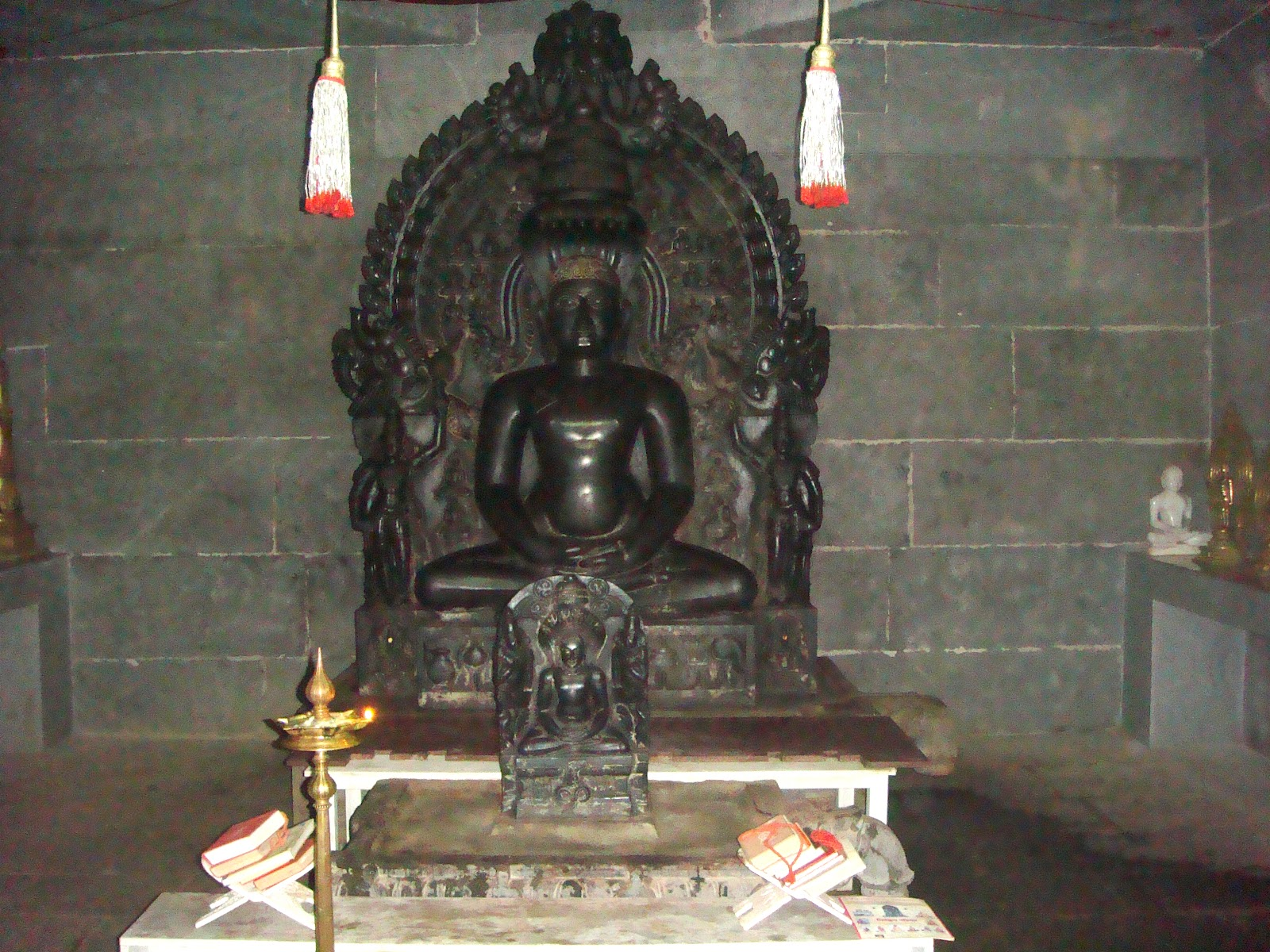
Mulnayak of Parshva within the main temple at the Math

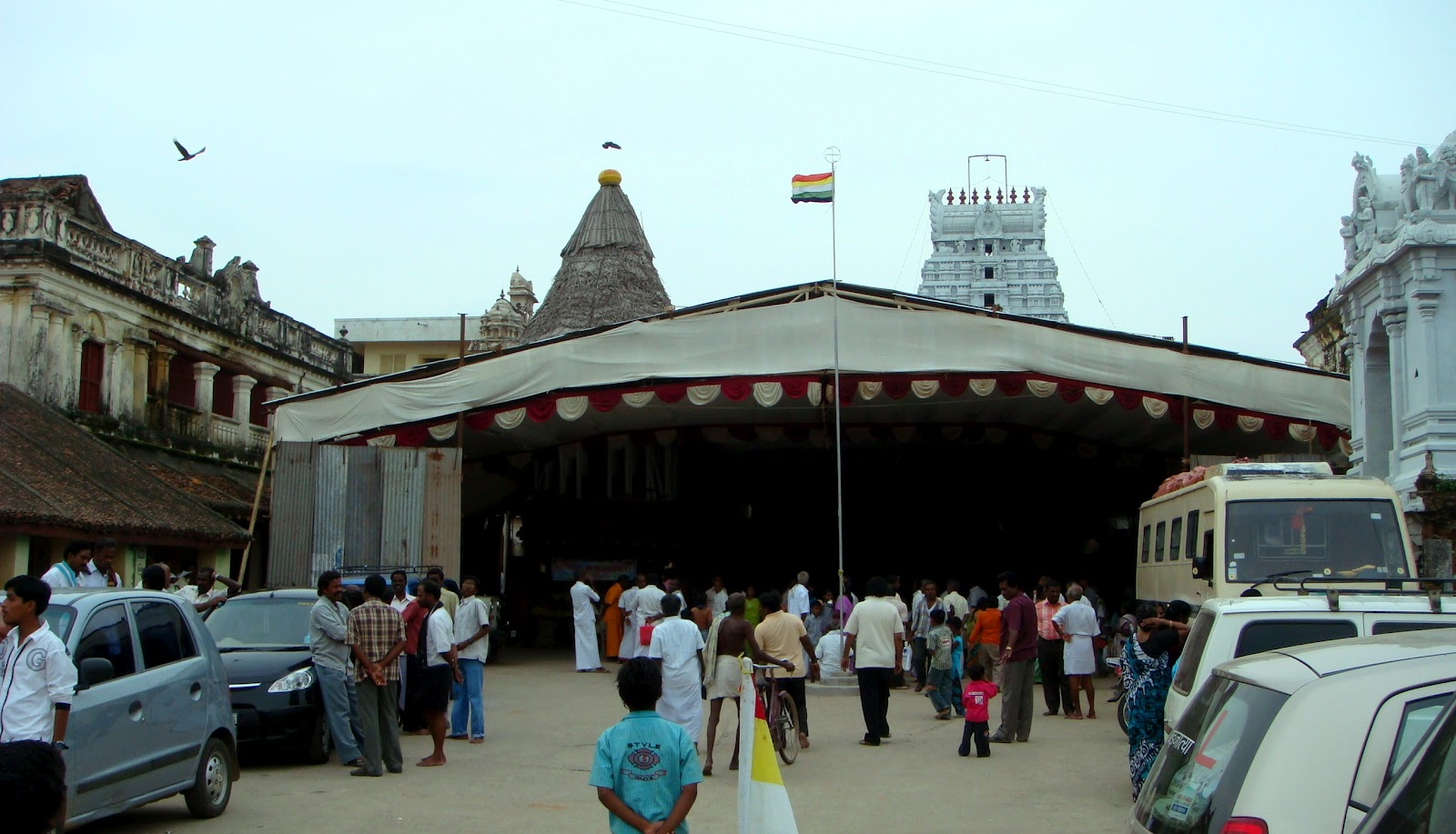
During a festival morning at the Math

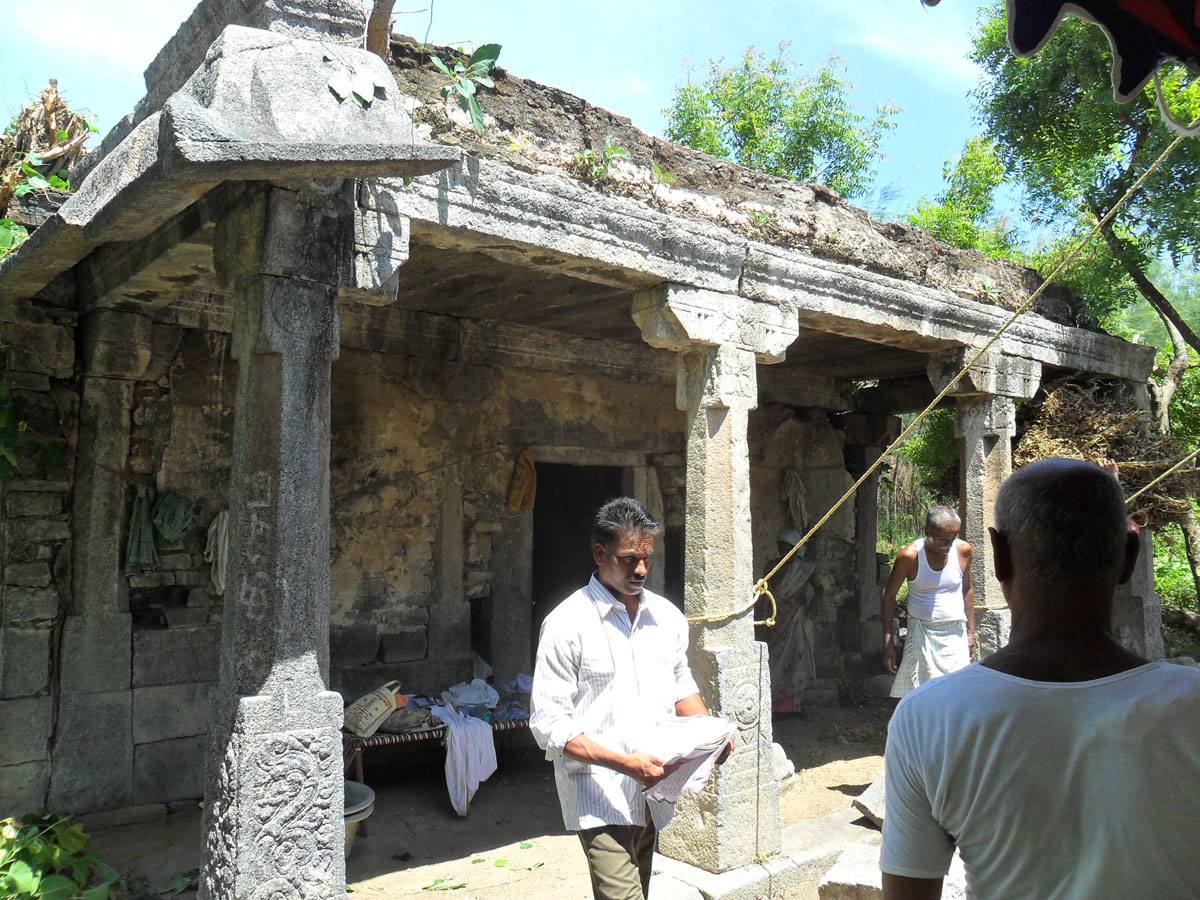
Gingee Jain Temple near Mel Sithamur Jain Math

== See also ==
- Jain Matha, Shravanabelgola
- Laxmisena
- Arahanthgiri Jain Mutt
