= Laxmisena =

Laxmisena Bhattaraka
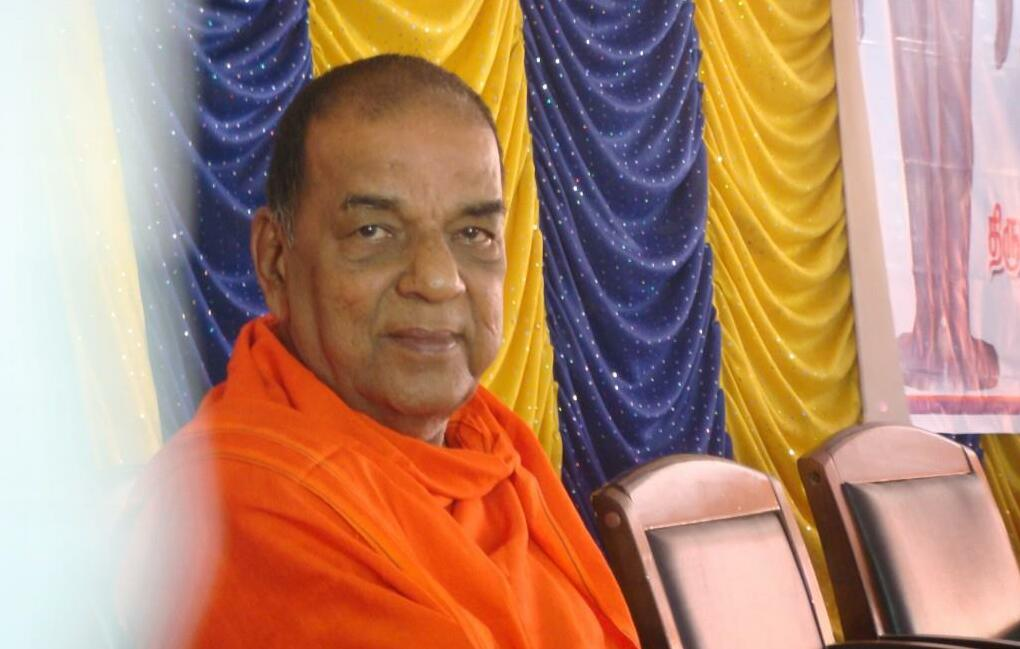
- Title: Bhattaraka

Personal life
- Born: Tamil Nadu, India

Religious life
- Religion: Jainism

Religious career
- Based in: Gingee, Tamil Nadu, India
- Post: Bhattaraka of Mel Sithamur Jain Math

Laxmisena, or Lakshmisena, is the name given to the head (Bhattaraka) of the Mel Sithamur Jain Math.

== Current position ==
Bhattaraka Laxmisena of the Mel Sithamur Jain Maṭha is the primary religious head of the Tamil Jain community. The Bhattarakas of Mel Sithamur Jain Maṭha are also the heads of all Tamil Jain temples so they have also been given the title of Sarva Jinalaya Paribalakar.

He is responsible for the management and maintenance of Jain temples in his locality or under the guidance of his maṭha. He is also responsible for performing various religious ceremonies including the consecration (Panch-kalyanak Pratishtha) of new idols.

He has also been instrumental in contributing to various social causes. In January 2011, a scheme to donate food grains to the needy was inaugurated by him.

== See also ==
- Dhavalakeerthi
- Arahanthgiri Jain Math
- Tamil Jain
- Mel Sithamur Jain Math
