= Religion in Tamil Nadu =

Religion in the Indian state

Religion in Tamil Nadu consists of various religions practiced by the populace of the state. Hinduism is the predominant religion in the state with significant Christian and Muslim minorities. As a home to a multitude of religions, the Tamil culture reflects the influence of the same. Various places of worship are spread across the state.

== Demographics ==
Religion in Tamil Nadu (2011)
1. Hinduism (87.6%)
2. Christianity (6.12%)
3. Islam (5.86%)
4. Jainism (0.12%)
5. Others/Not stated (0.31%)

Religion in Tamil Nadu
Religion	1951		1961		1991		2001		2011	
Religion	Population	(%)	Population	(%)	Population	(%)	Population	(%)	Population	(%)
Hinduism	27,212,641	90.35	30,297,115	89.94	49,532,052	88.67	54,985,079	88.11	63,188,168	87.58
Christianity	1,427,382	4.74	1,762,954	5.23	3,179,410	5.69	3,785,060	6.06	4,418,331	6.12
Islam	1,442,935	4.79	1,560,414	4.73	3,052,717	5.46	3,470,647	5.56	4,229,479	5.86
Jainism	22,165	0.07	28,350	0.08	66,900	0.12	83,359	0.13	89,265	0.12
Sikhism	2,386	<0.01	2,567	<0.01	5,449	0.01	9,545	0.02	14,601	0.02
Buddhism	777	<0.01	1,179	<0.01	2,128	<0.01	5,393	0.01	11,186	0.02
Other	10,359	0.04	34,776	0.11	2,620	<0.01	7,252	0.01	7,414	0.01
Not stated	Not recognized				17,670	0.05	59,344	0.09	188,586	0.26
Total	30,119,047	100	33,686,953	100	55,858,946	100	62,405,679	100	72,147,030	100

== Hinduism ==
As per the Sangam literature, the Sangam landscape (300 BCE to 300 CE) was classified into five categories known as thinais, which were associated with a Hindu deity: Murugan in kurinji (hills), Thirumal in mullai (forests), Indiran in marutham (plains), Varunan in the neithal (coasts), and Kotravai in palai (desert). Thirumal is indicated as a deity during the Sangam era who was regarded as Paramporul ("the supreme one") and also known as Māyavan, Māmiyon, Netiyōn, and Māl in various Sangam literature. While Shiva-worship existed in the Shaivite culture as a part of the Tamil pantheon, Murugan became regarded as the Tamil kadavul ("God of the Tamils"). In the 7th century CE, the Pandyas and Pallavas, supporters of Buddhism and Jainism, transitioned to become patrons of Hinduism. This shift occurred with the revival of Saivism and Vaishnavism during the Bhakti movement spearheaded by the Alwars and Nayanmars. Hinduism developed in the temples and mathas of medieval Tamil Nadu with self-conscious rejection of Jain practices.

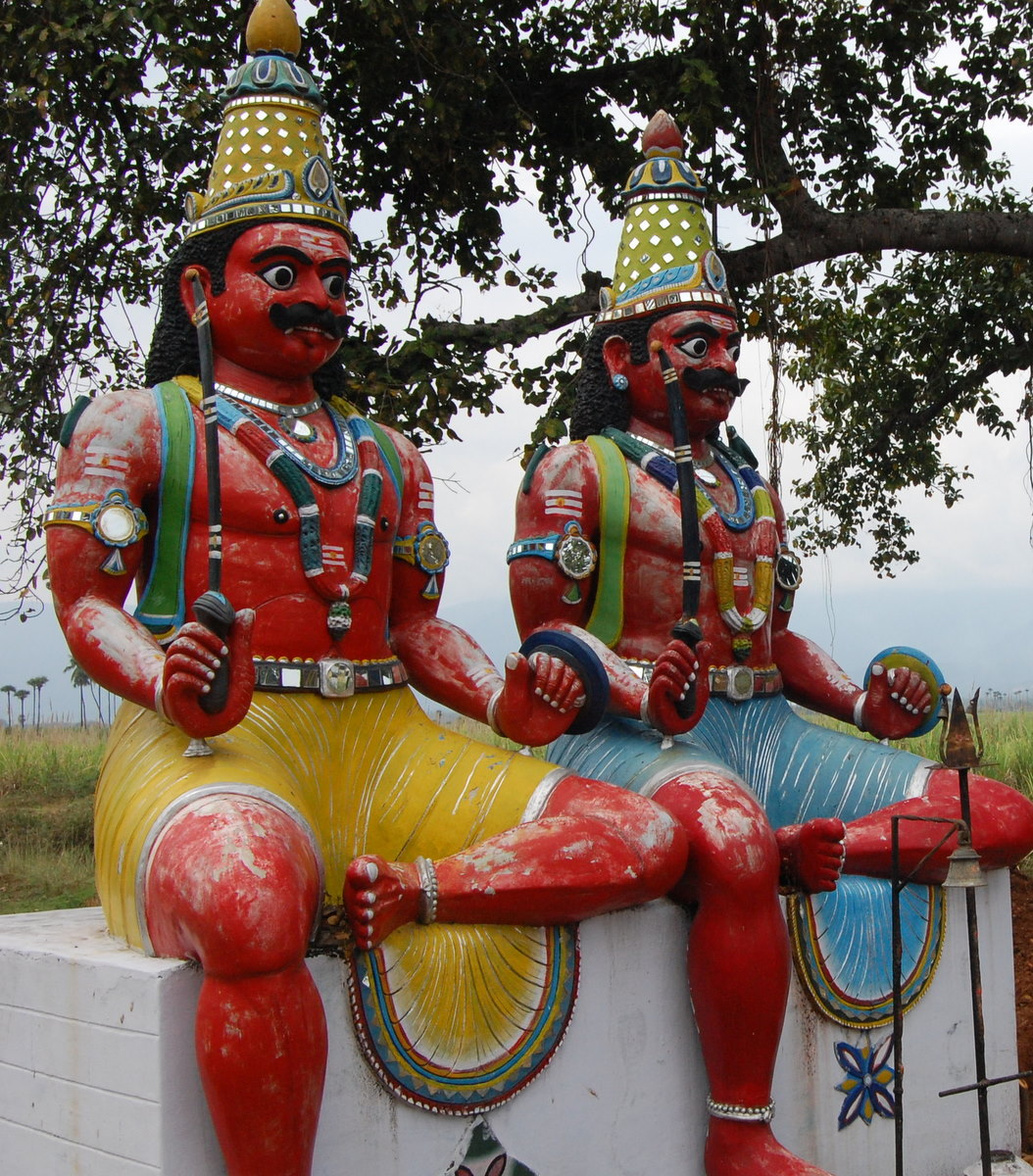
Aiyyan̲ār, guardian folk deity of Tamils

In Tamil tradition, Murugan is the youngest son of Shiva and Parvati; Pillayar is regarded as the eldest son and venerated as the Mudanmudar kadavul ("foremost god"). The worship of Amman, also called Mariamman, is thought to have been derived from an ancient mother goddess, and is also very common. In rural areas, local deities, called Aiyyan̲ār (also known as Karuppan, Karrupasami), are worshipped who are thought to protect the villages from harm.

As of the 21st century, majority of the population of Tamil Nadu are adherents of Hinduism with more than 89% of the population adhering to the same. As a majority religion, the influence of Hinduism is seen widely in the Tamil culture including literature, music and dance. Most visual arts are religious in some form and usually centers on Hinduism, although the religious element might be a vehicle to represent universal and, occasionally, humanist themes. Visual art ranges from stone sculptures in temples, to detailed bronze icons and frescoes and murals on temple walls.

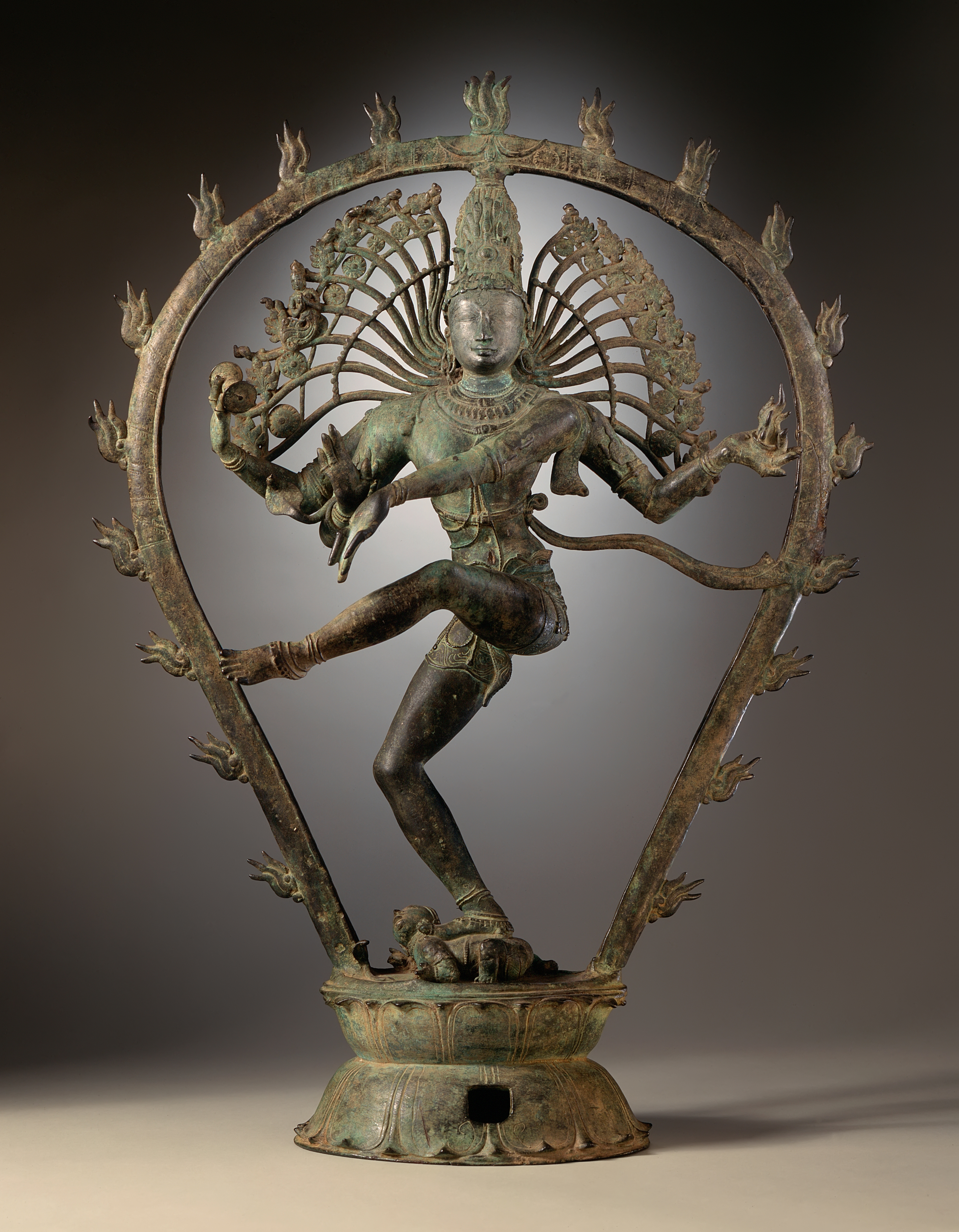
A Chola bronze statue of Nataraja, god of dance, to whom Bharatanatyam is often dedicated

Majority of the available literature from the Sangam period was Hindu and categorized in the tenth century CE into two categories based roughly on chronology as the patiṉeṇmēlkaṇakku ("the eighteen greater text series") comprising Ettuthogai (or Ettuttokai, "Eight Anthologies") and the Pattuppāṭṭu ("Ten Idylls"). The Tamil literature that followed in the next 300 years after the Sangam period is generally called the "post-Sangam" literature. Tirukkural is a book on ethics, by Thiruvalluvar. Prominent works include Ramavataram, written in 12th century CE by Kambar and Tiruppugal by Arunagirinathar in 14th century CE.

Apart from traditional instruments from the Sangam period, Nadaswaram, a reed instrument that is often accompanied by the thavil, a type of drum instrument are the major musical instruments used in temples and weddings. The traditional music of Tamil Nadu is known as Carnatic music, which includes rhythmic and structured music dedicated to Gods. Bharatanatyam is a major genre of Indian classical dance that originated in Tamilakam and is represented to invoke Nataraja, a form of Shiva. There are many folk dance forms that originated and are practiced in the region which are done in veneration to Hindu gods and goddesses such as Kavadiattam, Mayilattam, Bhagavatha nadanam, Devarattam, Kai silambattam, Kuravanji and Urumiattam. Koothu is a form of street theater that consists of a play performance which consists of dance along with music, narration and singing, usually dedicated to goddesses such as Mariamman with stories drawn from Hindu epics such as Ramayana and Mahabharata, mythology and folklore. The dance is accompanied by music played from traditional instruments and a kattiyakaran narrates the story during the performance.

Pongal is a major and multi-day harvest festival dedicated to the Surya, the Sun God. Puthandu is known as Tamil New Year which marks the first day of year on the Tamil calendar. Other prominent festivals include Karthikai Deepam, Thaipusam, Aadi Perukku, and Panguni Uthiram.

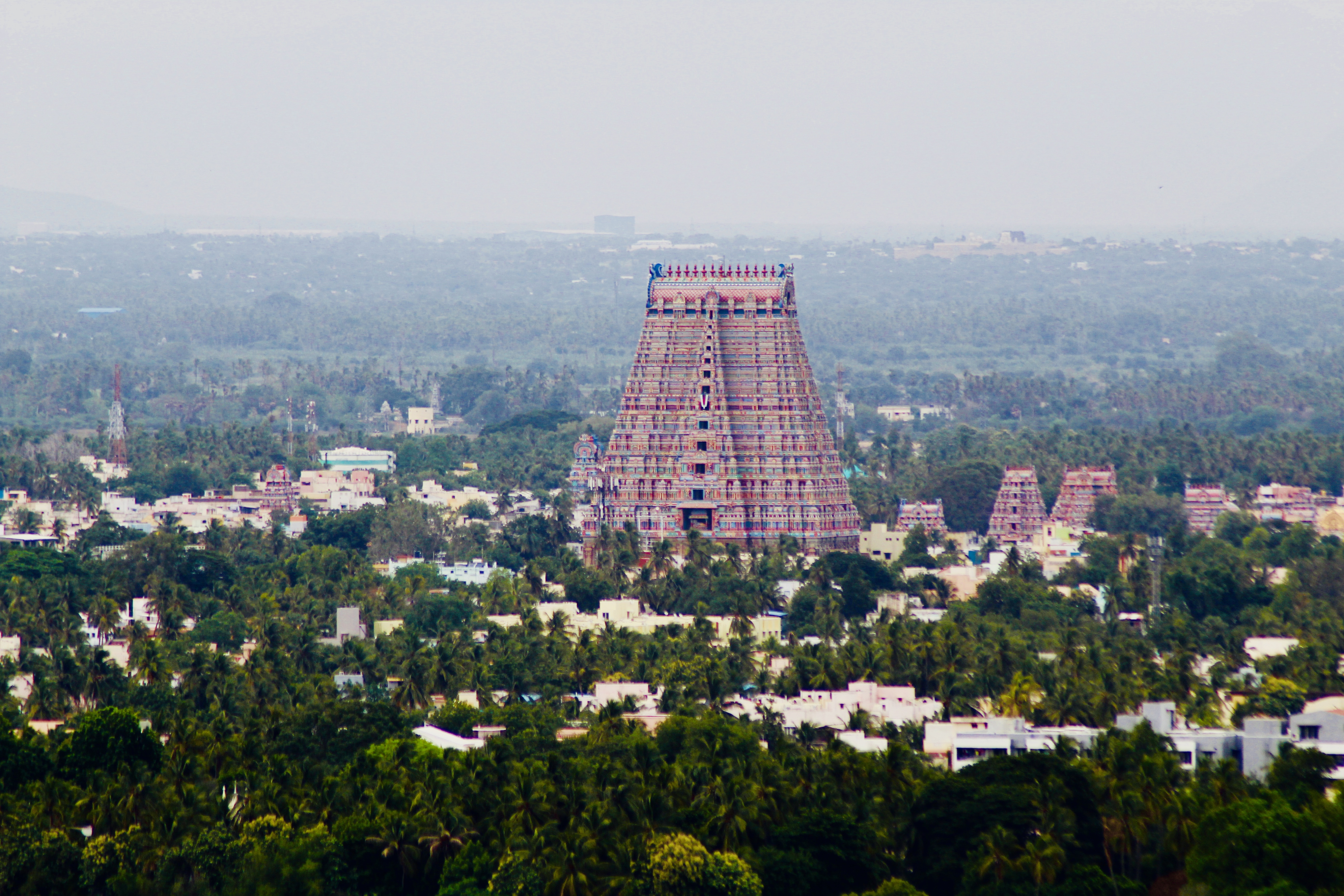
Ranganathaswamy Temple, Srirangam, the largest functioning temple in India

Dravidian architecture is the distinct style of rock architecture from the state, where the koils considered of porches or Mantapas preceding the door leading to the sanctum, Gate-pyramids or Gopurams in quadrangular enclosures that surround the temple, Pillared halls and a tank called the Kalyani or Pushkarni. The Gopuram is a monumental tower, usually ornate at the entrance of the temple forms a prominent feature of the Hindu temples of the Dravidian style. There are a number of rock-cut cave-temples established by the ancient Tamil kings and later by Pandyas and Pallavas. The Group of Monuments at Mahabalipuram, built by the Pallavas in the 7th and 8th centuries has more than forty rock-cut temples and monoliths including one of the largest open-air rock reliefs in the world.

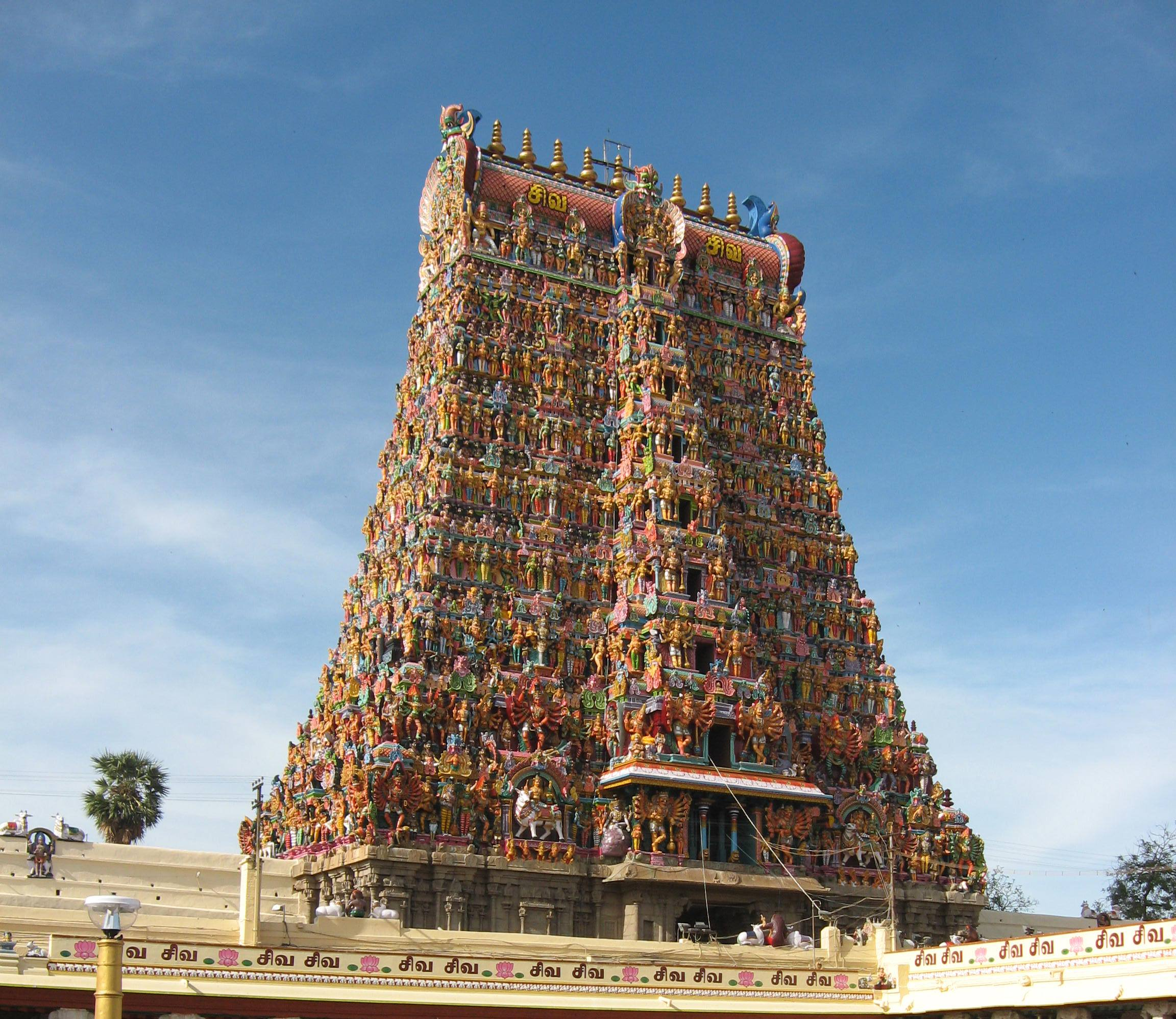
Meenakshi Temple at Madurai. The large Gopuram is a hall-mark of Dravidian architecture

There are more than 34,000 temples in Tamil Nadu built across various periods some of which are several centuries old. Most temples follow the Dravidian architecture, a distinct style of rock architecture. 84 of the 108 Divya Desams, which are Vishnu and Lakshmi temples that is mentioned in the works of the Alvars are located in Tamil Nadu. Paadal Petra Sthalam are 276 Shaivite temples that are revered in the verses of Nayanars in the 6th-9th century CE. Pancha Bhuta Sthalam refers to temples dedicated to Shiva, each representing a manifestation of the five prime elements of nature. Arupadaiveedu are six temples which are dedicated Murugan. Madurai also called as "Temple city" consists of many temples including the massive Meenakshi Amman Temple with Kanchipuram, considered as one of the seven great holy cities being another major temple town with many temples dating back to the Pallava period. Srirangam Ranganathaswamy Temple is the largest temple complex in India and the biggest functioning Hindu temple in the world with a 236 feet (72 m) tall Rajagopuram, one of the tallest in the world.

Ramanathaswamy Temple located at Rameswaram island forms a part of Ram setu and is said to be sanctified by the lord Rama when he crossed the island on his journey to rescue his wife, Sita from the Ravana. Namakkal Anjaneyar Temple hosts a 18 ft (5.5 m) tall Hanuman statue, one of the tallest in India. There are a lot of temples devoted to lord Ganesha, major of which are the Uchippillaiyar temple in Tiruchirappalli, Eachanari Vinayagar temple in Coimbatore hosting a 6.3 ft (1.9 m) tall idol and Karpaka Vinayakar temple in Pillayarapatti. There are a number of hill temples dedicated to lord Murugan and Amman temples across the state. Swami Vivekananda is said to have attained enlightenment on a rock, located off the coast of Kanniyakumari, which houses the Vivekananda Rock Memorial since 1970.

== Christianity ==
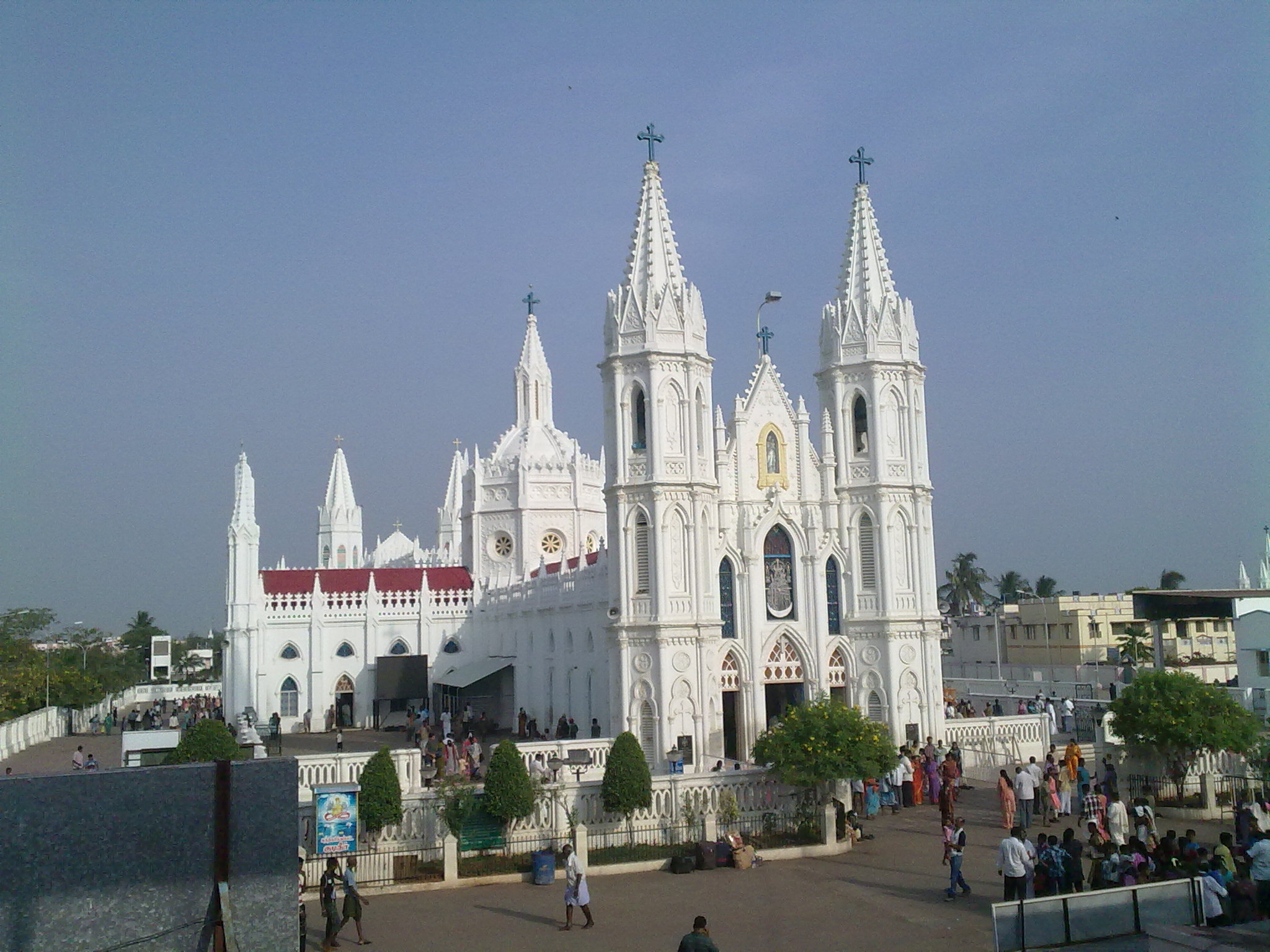
The 16th-century Basilica of Our Lady of Good Health at Velankanni

The Christian apostle, St. Thomas, is believed to have landed in the Malabar Coast in 52 CE and built St. Mary's Church in Thiruvithamcode, Kanyakumari district in 63 AD and preached in the area around present day Chennai till 70 CE. The Santhome Church, which was originally built by the Portuguese in 1523, is believed to house the remains of St. Thomas and was rebuilt in 1893 in neo-Gothic style. In 1578, the Portuguese published a book in old Tamil script named 'Thambiraan Vanakkam', the first book in any Indian language to be printed and published. The Europeans started to establishing trade centers from the 16th century CE along the eastern coast of the state, and the region was under the rule of British Raj from the 18th century to the mid 20th century. This also brought Christian missionaries, who established churches and introduced the religion to various parts of the state.

As per the 2011 census, Christianity is the second largest religion in the state with the total number of Christians numbering 4,418,331, forming 6.12% of the total population of the state. There is a larger proportion of Christians in the southern districts, Kanyakumari (46%), Thoothukudi (16.7%) and Tirunelveli (10.6%). The 16th-century Basilica of Our Lady of Good Health is located at Velankanni, about 12 km (7.5 mi) south of Nagapattinam on the Eastern coast. The town declared as a holy city by the pope is known as the 'Lourdes of the East'.

== Islam ==
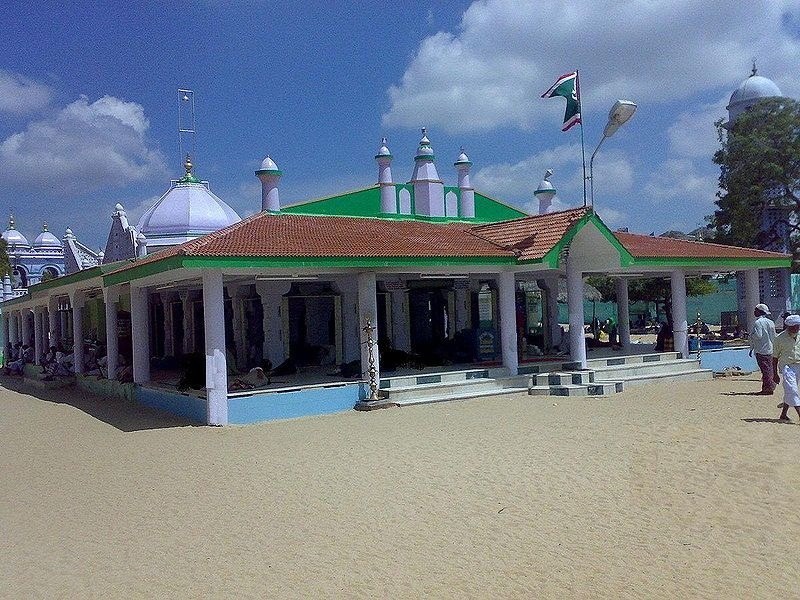
Erwadi Dargah, one of the oldest mosques

Islam was introduced due to the influence from the Arab region and the majority of the Muslims are native Tamils who converted on the influence of Cheraman Perumal. Unlike from other parts of India, nearly 90% of the Muslims in the state speak Tamil rather than Urdu as their mother tongue. Arabic inscriptions from the ninth century CE at Kayalpatnam, detail about endowments given to the mosques by Pandyas. The earliest literary work in the community was the Palsanthmalai from the 13th century with the most popular being the epic Seerapuranam by Umaru Pulavar in the 17th century

As of 2011, Islam is the third largest religion in the state with 4,229,479 followers, making up 5.86% of the population. The Kilakarai Jumma Masjid, built in the 7th century CE, has prominent Dravidian architectural characteristics and is one of the oldest mosques in India. Erwadi houses an 840-year-old mosque and the annual santhanakoodu festival held during the Islamic month of Dhul Qidah attracts people of all faiths from different regions. Nagore Dargah where the urs festival is celebrated every year and attracts pilgrims from both Sufi Islam and Hinduism.

== Jainism ==
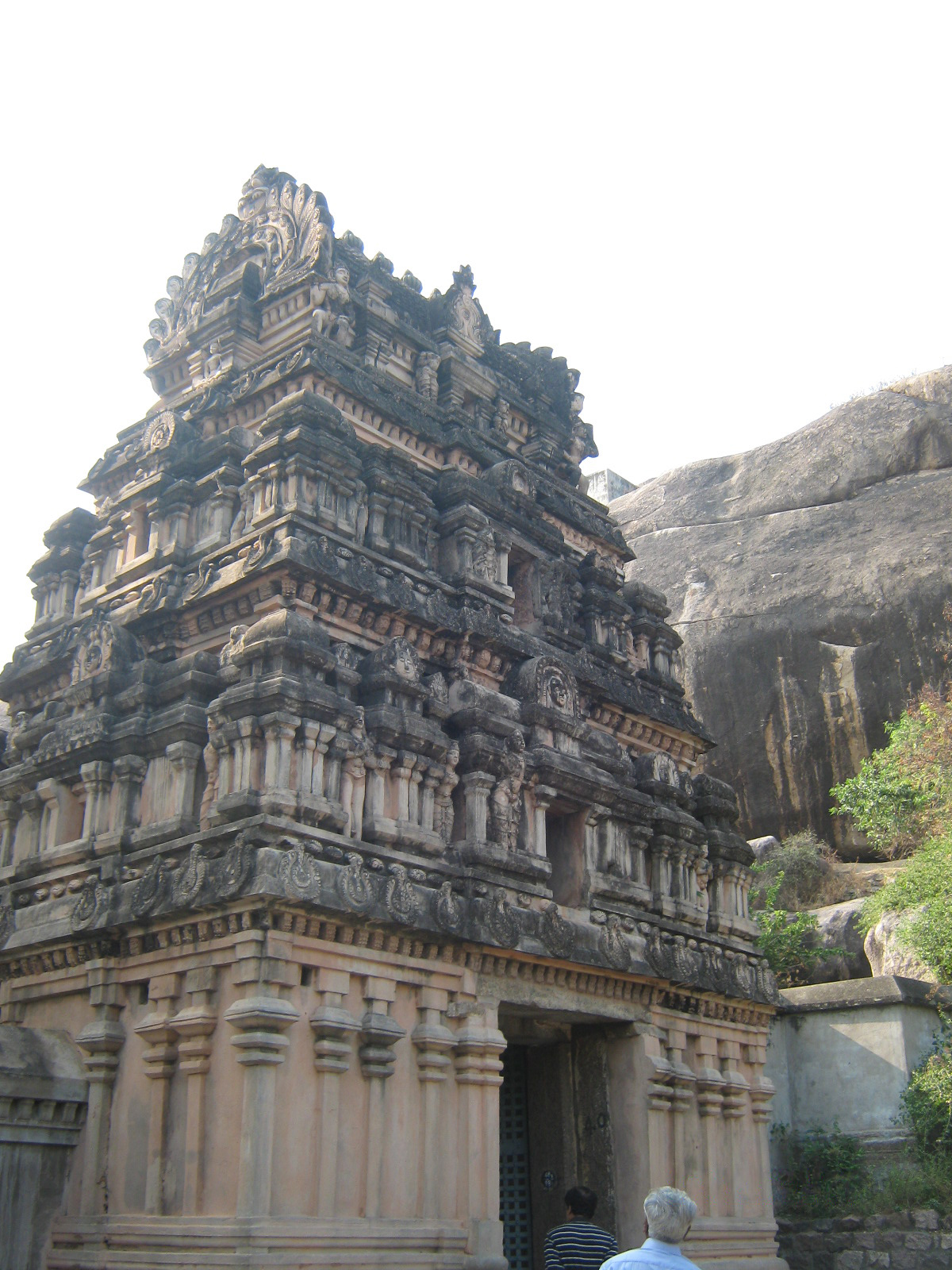
Mahavira temple at Tirumalai

Tamil Jains existed from the sangam era with inscriptions and drip-ledges from first century BCE to sixth century CE and temple monuments likely built by Digambara Jains in the ninth century found in Chitharal and several Tamil-Brahmi inscriptions, stone beds and sculptures from more than 2,200 years ago found in Samanar hills. They were known as Camaṇar in Tamil and the Sangam literature of Silappatikaram, Nālaṭiyār and Cīvaka Cintāmaṇi were attributed to Jain authors. The early Jains were part of the Digambara sect and use the title Nainar. The Kalabhra dynasty, who ruled over the ancient Tamil country in the 3rd–7th century CE were patrons of Jainism. Some of the early kings of the Cheras, Pandyas and Pallavas patronized Jainism.

As of 2011, Jainism is the fourth largest religion in the state with 89,265 (0.12%) adherents. The northern districts of Tiruvannamalai, Vellore, Cuddalore and Villupuram have a significant Jain population. They generally are vegetarians and retain some of the old Jain customs.

Kalugumalai consist of three rock-cut temples–Kalugumalai Jain Beds, Vettuvan Koil and Kalugasalamoorthy Temple, with rock relief sculptures dating back to Pandya period of 8th to 9th century. Major Jain temples include Kanchi Trilokyanatha temple, Chitharal Jain Temple, Mannargudi Mallinatha Swamy Temple, Vijayamangalam Jain temple, Alagramam Jain Temple, Poondi Arugar Temple, Thanjavur Adisvaraswamy Jain Temple and Kumbakonam Chandraprabha Jain Temple. Tirumalai is an ancient Jain temple complex in the outskirts of Tirvannamalai that houses caves and Jain temples and a 16 feet (4.9 m) high sculpture of Neminatha dated from the 12th century and the tallest Jain image in Tamil Nadu.

== Buddhism ==
Buddhism was influential in Tamil Nadu before the later Middle Ages with the early Pandyas and Pallavas patronizing Buddhism. There is a mention of a Buddhist pilgrimage route from Ceylon to Bodh Gaya via Kaveripattinam in ancient Tamilakam with ruins of a 4th-century Buddhist monastery, a Buddha statue and a Buddhapada (footprint of the Buddha) found in the region. Nākappaṭṭinam is found in the Burmese historical text of the 3rd century BCE, mentioning a Vihāra from the period of Ashoka. Various scholarly works in Tamil and Pali, dating back to the 5th-7th century CE have been attributed to Tamil Buddhist scholars, with the most well-known being the epic-poem Manimekalai by Chithalai Chathanar. Buddhism saw some revival from the late 9th century CE and the Chudamani Vihara in Nagapattinam was built by the Srivijaya king Maravijayottunggavarman under the patronage of Raja Raja Chola I in early 11th century CE with various Buddha bronze statues dated between 11th and 16th century CE being found in the region. As per the 2011 census, 11,186 people identified as followers of Buddhism, which was 0.02% of the total population of Tamil Nadu.

== Sikhism ==
As of 2011, Sikhs numbered 14,601 (0.02%) in the total population of Tamil Nadu. Majority of the Sikhs are people who migrated to Tamil Nadu for agricultural and business purposes. Sikhs have settled in most major cities and have established various Gurudwaras and educational institutions in the state. The Gurudwara Guru Nanak Dham is located in Rameswaram.

== See also ==
- Religion in Chennai
