= Periyanayaki Shrine, Thiruvithancode =

Mary Matha Shrine is a Roman Catholic church located at Thiruvithamcode in Kanyakumari District of Tamil Nadu in India. The church is also called the Church of the Ascension of our Lord or the Ascension Jesus Church and is believed to have been established by St Francis Xavier. The shrine of Mary at Thiruvithamcode is rich with its own historical significance and importance. The fact that many saints have sanctified this soil by their visit to this place also adds more importance to this place. Thiruvithamcode was previously part of the Kingdom of Travancore.

== Location ==
The Church is located at about 1 km from Thiruvithamcode Bus Stop, Thiruvithamcode is located at 3.5 km from Thuckalay, 13 km from Marthandam, 6 km from Eraniel, 6 km from Azhakiyamandapam, 6 km from Padmanabhapuram, 10 km from Colachel, 13 km from Thiruvattaru, 16 km from Nagercoil, 40 km from Kanyakumari. and 60 km from Thiruvananthapuram. If enroute on NH 47 towards Kanyakumari, take a right at Azhakiyamandapam to Thiruvithamcode. If coming from Madurai / Kanyakumari, at Thuckalay Main bus stand take a left to reach Thiruvithamcode. Nearest Railway Station is located at Eraniel and Nearest Airport is located at Thiruvananthapuram.

== Description ==
According to a historical note, the old church was built by Venadu King a thousand years ago. Here lies the tomb of Fr. Adhirian and here is where we see the traditional Annai statue where Our Lady Stands on Lotus. Every Wednesday at 5.00 pm Rosary and Novena are conducted and holy Eucharist is celebrated in this old church. A new Church was built and was blessed in 2012 along with the old church. The new church is built using different cultural arts such as Tamilazhan art, Travancore art, Islamic art and Gothic art. The structure of the new church reminds us of the St. Peter's basilica at Rome. The mysteries of the Holy Rosary are inscribed on the front doors of this church which help people in praying. The pillars of the main entrance have a rich look of the Padmanabhapuram Palace. Contact: Church of the Ascension of our Lord (Shrine of our Lady of matha), Thiruvithamcode, Kanyakumari District – 629 174

== History ==
=== Ancient times ===
Under the Chera dynasty the whole country was ruled over by as many as 156 petty kings. The ruling space of the each petty King was called ‘code’. One of such code is Thiruvithamcode. During 311 AD 29 January, a courageous Kulasekhara Perumal swore in as the first king of Thiruvithamcode. Thiruvithamcode was already considered as an eminent city during the time of Chera kings. The fact the English title ‘Travancore State Gazette’ was written in government records as Thiruvithamcode Sarkar Gazette in Malayalam even in the beginning of the 19th century show that Thiruvithamcode government had an eminent place.

But the deeper analysis of the history of this place calls us to go back to the first century AD. It is said and believed that in the first century St. Thomas, one of the twelve disciples of Jesus, came here and preached the good news and he built a church of Our Lady here in 70 AD. This church is today called as the "Thiruvithamcode Arappally" which is now owned and maintained by Syrian Orthodox Christian. People who followed St. Thomas did continue to preach the Gospel and converted many to Christianity. Those Christians used this St. Mary's Arappally as the place of prayer and liturgy. This church was being closed for many centuries. This historical Arappally, thus, stands as a piece of evidence to the claim that there were Christians in this Thiruvithamcode region from the first century onward.

=== 11th century ===
A note that dates back to 1060 shows that interior fishermen community people from Palayam to Thittuvilai considered Thiruvithamcode as a capital place. The existence of a Church and presbytery on the top of it for the pastors to serve the Christians from Trivandrum to Vadakkankulam here, also stresses that this place was considered to be an important one by the Christians too. When in 1544, St. Francis Xavier who visited the king Rama Varma and his brother Marthanda Varma, who were then staying in the Thiruvithamcode palace, to convey the message from the Portuguese governor regarding his military help also visited this Church that was in Thiruvithamcode.

St. Francis Xavier obtained the permission to preach in the coastal village of Tamil Nadu from here. He stayed here for some times. It should be proudly noted that St. Francis Xavier started his missionary work in Tamil Nadu from here. St. John de Britto, who was doing missionary work having Madurai as the centre, visited this church in 1682, when he came to the Jesuits’ house in Pillai Thoppu. When Devasahayam Pillai was persecuted for having accepted the Gospel, in order to humiliate him and as a sign of warning to other people, he was taken on buffalo, to various places and he was dragged through the streets of Thiruvithamcode too.

There is a tunnel found at the northern side of this Church. The tradition of Devasahayam Pillai indicates that he was imprisoned in that tunnel and later on he was imprisoned in Keralapuram which was nearby this church. For Many centuries, this parish was functioning as a separate parish. Missionaries of different congregations such as Jesuits, Franciscans, and Carmelites have worked here. It is known from a note dating back to 1765 that professionally and culturally the villages such as Aatoor, Eraniel, Mulagumoodu, Manalikarai, Pazhayakadai, Puthenkadai, Vaaruthattu, Mekamandapam, Padmanabhapuram, Thalakuzham and Thikkanamkodu, where people of Chavalkarar community or Mukkuva community resided, were attached to Thiruvithamcode.

=== 18th century ===
In 1708, Fr. Simon De Carvalheev and Fr. Meynord, both Carmelites, were the Parish Priests of Thiruvithamcode. In 1717, Rev.Fr. Louis Rodrigues was the Rector of the Shrine in Thiruvithamcode. Rev. Fr. Athiriyan, who was born in Spain in 1818, and who was ordained in the year 1848, came here and did his ministry as the Rector of this Shrine. In 1860 while he was doing ministry in Thikkanamkodu Church, he died there and his body was brought to the Thiruvithamcode Shrine and was buried here. This news is found in the inscription tablet that is found in this church. There is a popular belief to date that making children roll on the oil-pored tomb of Fr. Athiriyan would bring the children good health.

After the demise of Fr. Athiriyan, Thiruvithamcode along with the other villages which were attached to it became substations to Karamkadu Parish. Later in 1861 it was the substation of Mulagumoodu and in 1954, it became the substation of Kalkurichy parish and from 1971, it was the substation of Mailacodu. On 15 October 2004, when the then Bishop of Kottar, Most Rev. Bp. Leon A. Dharmaraj announced Thiruvithamcode as a separate parish, it stood as the 132nd parish of the then Kottar Diocese. By which Thiruvithamcode again attained the status of a separate parish after 156 long years. Now Thiruvithamcode parish is part of the newly erected diocese Kuzhithurai and it is regarded as one of the becoming shrines of the district.

The patron of the church in Thiruvithamcode is Ascending Lord. But until the 17th century it was a church dedicated to Our Lady of Assumption. Veeramamunivar, who wrote ‘Thembavani’, a Tamil classical work, in 1726 AD, called our Lady in Tamil ‘Annai’. It is he who, following Tamil cultural traditions, built the famous church having Annai as the patron in the place called Konaan Kuppam. This tradition of calling our Lady as Mary and devotion to her reached Thiruvithamcode slowly. A miraculous incident had been the starting point for the devotion to Annai here. Once when a fisherman with his boat was caught up in a storm in the sea and there was no way out to escape, he prayed for the intercession of Annai. He also vowed in his mind that if he escaped the storm and reached the shore, he would start the devotion to Mary.

It was with the helping hand of Annai that he reached the shore alive. As soon as he reached the shore he met the Parish Priest and stated what had happened. At his request, before 18 year, during the time of Rev. Fr. Pascal Raj, the devotion to Mary Matha was started here. From then on many devotees and pilgrims have been flocking together in this shrine. It has been recorded that through her intercession Annai is working numerous miracles in this shrine. The numerous people who come to visit this shrine testify to it.

== Church patron ==
The Ascending Lord being the patron of the Church, the Church feast is celebrated for 10 days during the Easter season based on the feast of Ascension of our Lord. The Feast for Matha is also being celebrated for three days during the end of every January. On every Fridays, Mass is being celebrated and Novena is being conducted at 11:30 AM and 5:00 PM. Numerous devotees from Thirunelveli, Thoothukudi districts and from Kerala state are approaching this Shrine. By the grace of Our Lord and by the Intercession of Mary Matha this shrine has become a place where many come together crossing the barriers of caste, state and religion to be filled with the grace of God.
