= Mekkamandapam =

Coordinates: 8°16′59″N 77°17′59″E

Mekkamandapam is a small village in the Kanyakumari district in the Indian state of Tamil Nadu.

Mekkamandapam which is situated in the state highway Colachel to Kulasekaram. Sree thampuraan kovil Sree Nagaraja nagaeakshi temple. Arobana Annai Church is famous in this area along with the Jumma Masjid (மேக்காமண்டபம் பள்ளிவாசல்) mosque.

Mekkamandapam Market is the main market for the surrounding villages. The market is mainly for fish and vegetables.
