= St. Mary's Church, Thiruvithamcode =

Ancient Syriac church in Thiruvithamkode, India

St. Mary's Orthodox Syrian Church, Thiruvithamkode, also called Thiruvithamcode Arappally ("Royal Church"; Tamil: திருவிதாங்கோடு அரப்பள்ளி) or Thomayar Kovil, is a church located in Thiruvithamcode in Kanyakumari District, Tamil Nadu state in India. It is believed by the Christian communities in Kerala that the historic Thiruvithamcode Arappally, also called Amalagiri church as named by the Chera King Uthiyan Cheralathan, was built by St. Thomas, known as the Apostle of India, in 63 AD.

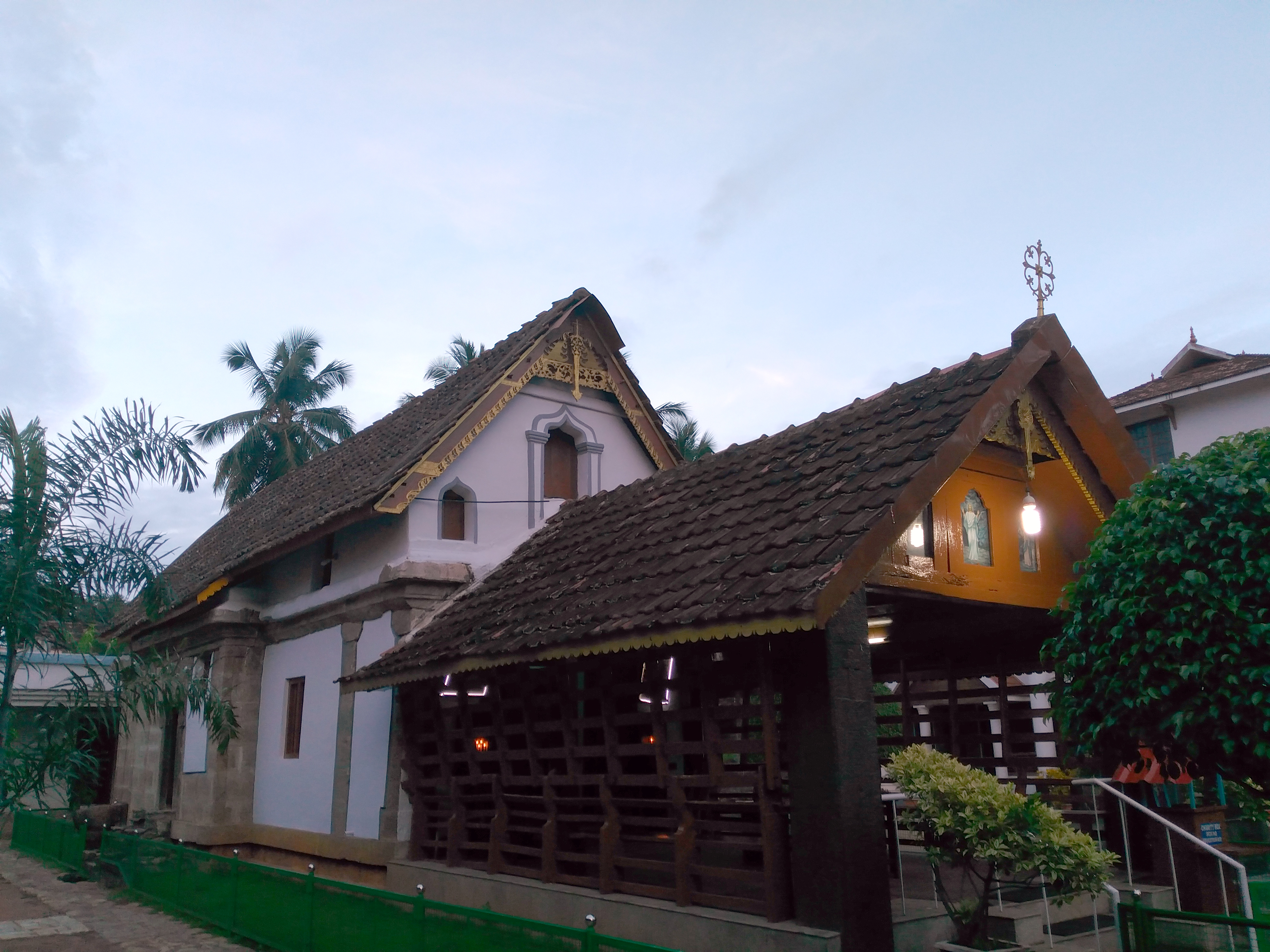
Side view of the church

It claims to be the world's oldest church that still has daily prayers and India's oldest church that hasn't been reconstructed till now, it is actually one of the earliest of the churches to be rebuilt by the Portuguese as per the prescriptions of the Synod of Diamper in the early 17th century. The church has three main parts built in the 17th century and a 20th-century entrance hall. Its walls are built of locally quarried stone, chiseled with a multi-tipped chisel, a technique known in Kerala and possibly introduced there by foreign contact in the 16th century.

Thiruvithamcode (also spelled Thiruvithancode, Thiruvithankodu and Thiruvithangodu) is a small panchayat town located in the Kanyakumari district of the Indian state of Tamil Nadu. It is about 20 km from Nagercoil, and 2 km from Thuckalay.

The church today is maintained by the Malankara Orthodox Syrian Church. Catholicos Baselios Marthoma Didymos I proclaimed the church as an international St. Thomas pilgrim center on 16 December 2007.

== Tradition ==
The current tradition is that the Thiruvithamkode Church was founded by Thomas the Apostle around 64 AD. Tradition has it that the king who ruled the region at the time was impressed by the activities and sermons of the Apostle Thomas and converted to Christianity. The king took the initiative to build a church in the area and the church was established accordingly, so the church came to be known as Arappalli or the Royal Church. Thiruvithamkode was the cradle and namesake of the Kingdom of Thiruvithamkoor (Travancore), a fact which may have influenced the origin of this tradition. According to another popular tradition, this name meant the "half-church", because it was smaller than the other seven churches founded by Thomas the Apostle. This may be attributed to its geographical isolation in the far south and ecclesiastical or demographic insignificance compared to other major Christian centers in Malabar.

=== Coromandel Origin ===
While these are the extant traditions, a documented and much older tradition points to the Nasrani exodus from Mylapore and the wider Coromandel region as the origin of the church and the Nasranis of Thiruvithamcode. These earlier traditions of the Thiruvithamkode church attributes its origin to the 64 families of Dariyaykal. This tradition holds that a sorcerer named Manikyavacakar started actively attacking Christians in Mylapore and the Coromandel Coast, both theological and politically sometime before the 9th century. The vast majority of Christians who succumbed to his preaching became the syncretic Manigramamakkar. The Dariyaykal or confessors are those Nasranis who remained steadfast to Christianity. They fled to Malabar due to the persecution and isolation of the Manikyavacakar and his followers. One group went to the Todamala hills and the other group reached Thiruvithamkode. The king settled the people who reached Thiruvithamkode and gave them permission to build a church there. This is said to be the origin of the Thiruvithamkode church in this tradition.

== History ==
Thiruvithamkode is recorded as the southernmost church and settlement of the Nasranis. The Action VIII Decree VI of the Synod of Diamper records that due to the geographical isolation, there were no priests or other ministers to provide religious instruction to the faithful in the church. It documents that for this reason, the people there turned away from the Christian faith and adopted local beliefs and lived without sacraments such as Baptism. The church building was also in a very poor condition. Therefore, Alexis Menezis decreed, by Synodal act, the rebuilding of the church in Portuguese fashion, the appointment of a vicar, and the supply of the necessary items for the church. The Jornada of Menezis documents that he did not personally visit the church but carried out his instructions through the vicar whom he appointed.

== Gallery ==
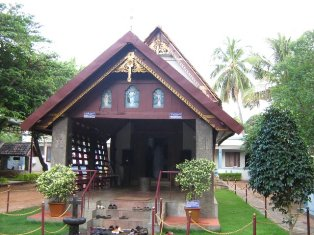
Front view

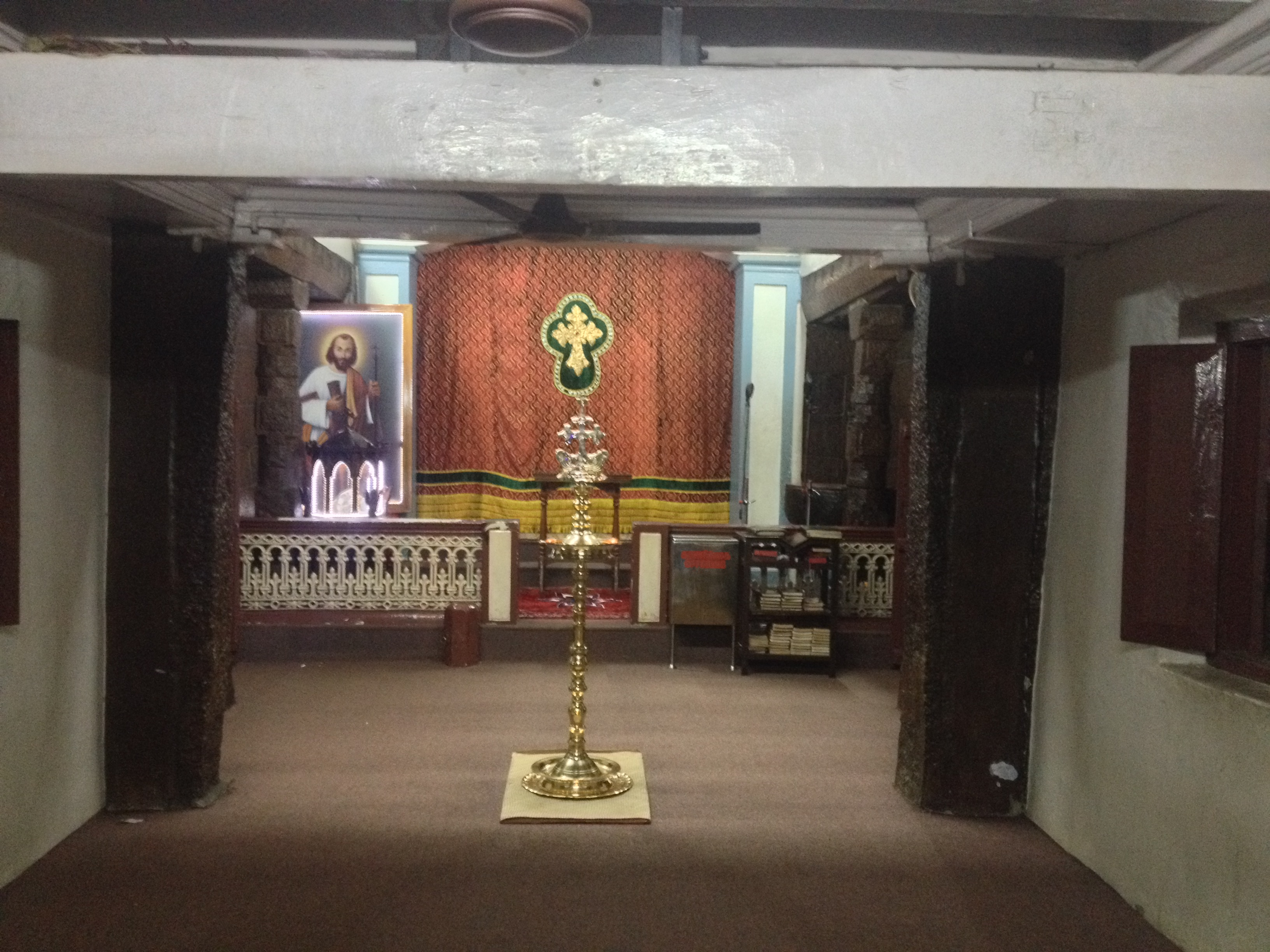
Inside the church

== See also ==
- Ezharappallikal
