= Gurudwara Guru Nanak Dham =

Gurdwara in Tamil Nadu, India

Gurudwara Guru Nanak Dham is a gurdwara situated in the town of Rameswaram in Tamil Nadu, India. The gurdwara was constructed to commemorate the visit of the first Sikh guru, Guru Nanak, to Rameswaram in about 1511. The gurdwara was visited by the Governor of Tamil Nadu, Surjit Singh Barnala in 2005. Barnala assured the priests of help in repairing and enlarging the gurudwara.

The gurdwara has since then been developed. As the number of Sikhs in Rameshwarm is not much, it is administered by the management of Sri Guru Nanak Sat Sangh Sabha Gurdwara, Chennai, Tamil Nadu, India.
