= Alagramam Jain Temple =

Jain temple in Tamil Nadu, India

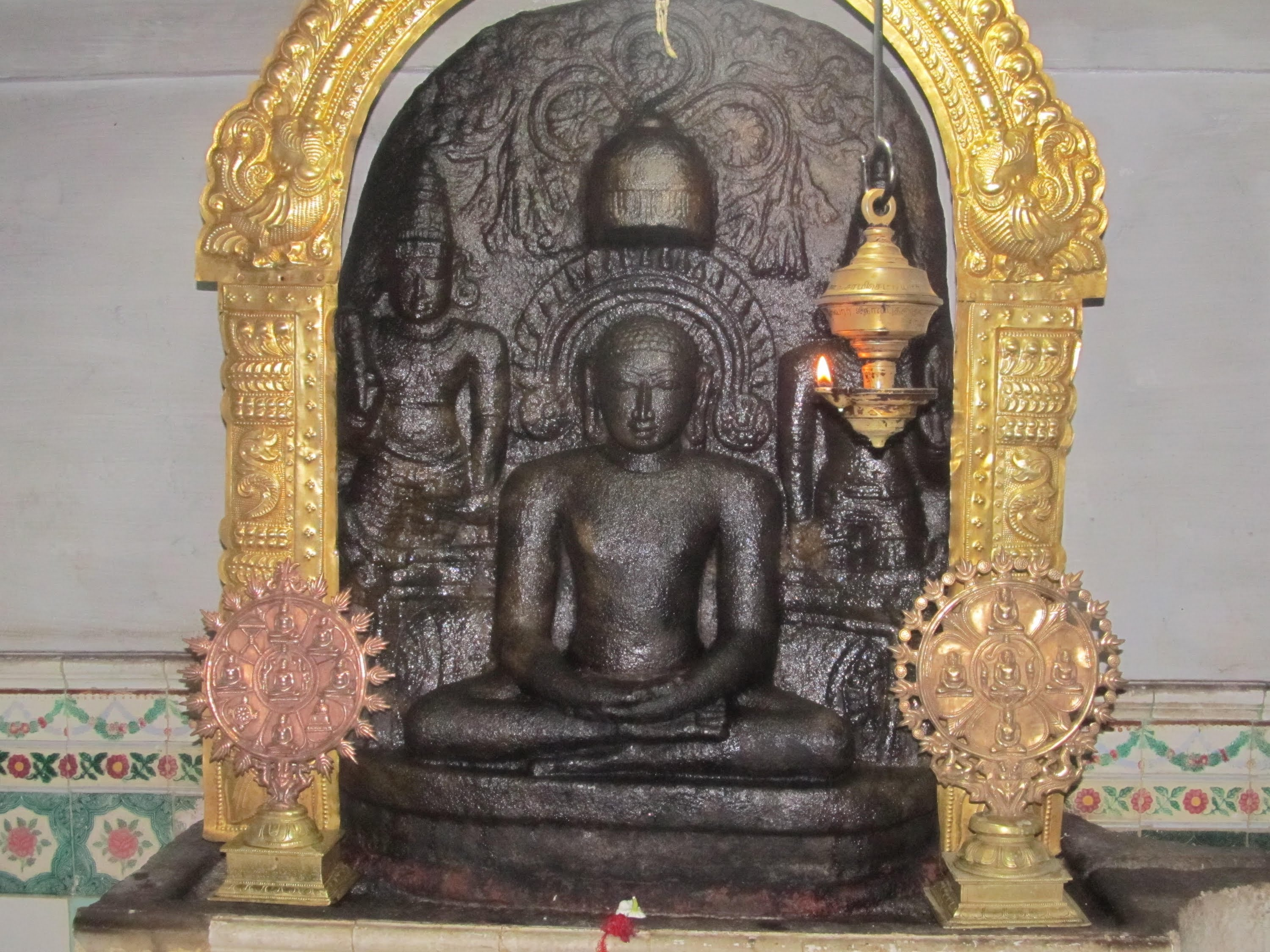
- 1008 Sri Adinatha Bagwan

Religion
- Affiliation: Jainism
- Deity: Adinath
- Festivals: Brahmotsavam(1874), Avani Avittam, etc.

Location
- Location: Alagramam, Tamil Nadu

Architecture
- Established: 17th century

Website
- alagramamjaintemple.in

Alagramam Jain Temple is a Jain temple located in Alagramam, in the Indian state of Tamil Nadu. The first Tirthankara of Jainism, Rishabhanatha, is the Moolavar (temple deity) who is worshipped there. Srivari Brahmotsavam ceremonial feast is conducted every year.

== History ==
The Alagramam Jain Temple was built in the 17th century. Before its construction, villagers had to travel to Keezh Idayalam Jain Temple or Avani Avittam Jain Temple for ritual wearing of the Poonool (also known as upanayana). During the 19th century, on the auspicious day of Avani Avittam, the local Jain community relocated a small Parshvanatha idol from the Keezh Idayalam Temple to Alagramam and built a temple dedicated to its worship.

A separate temple was built for Sri Dharma Devi Amman (Kushmandi), and for Sri Brahma Devar, a separate Panduga Silai Mandabam was constructed. The Temple was built in phases.

== Functions ==
=== Mahotsavam (Brahmotsavam) from 1894 ===
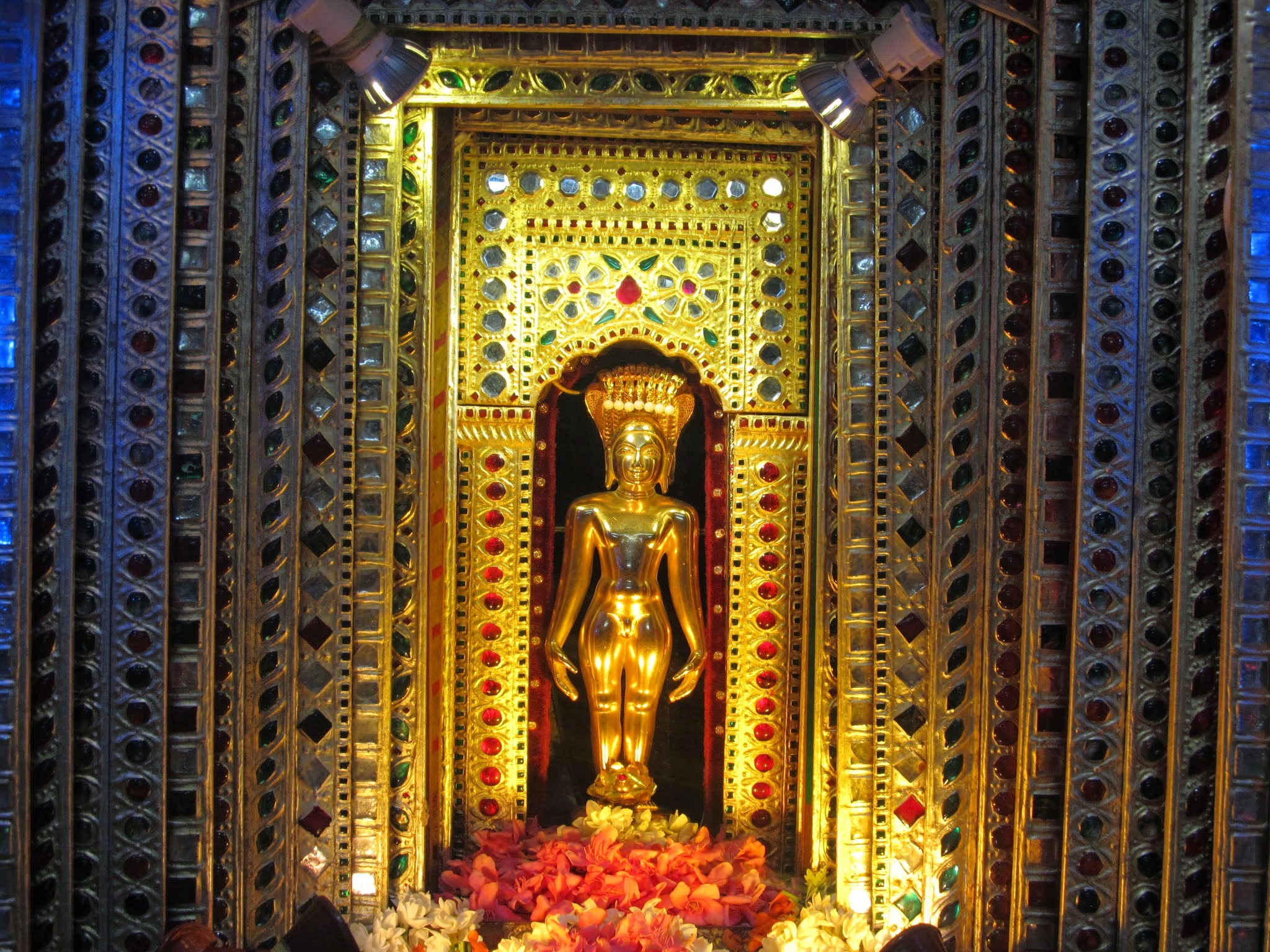
Alagramam Jain Temple Utsavar 1008 Sri Parshwanath Bhagwan

The annual fair (or Brahmotsavam) has been conducted in the temple since 1894 to honor Parshvanatha. The fair has day and night rituals for ten days. It is conducted during the Ashtaniyama Period, starting from Saptami Tithi and ending in Prathama Tithi. This is around June or July in the western calendar.

The 1st day is marked by a Flag Hoisting Ceremony. In the morning, the Darbar flag is hoisted, and at night the main flag, Tvajarohanam, with an image of Sarvana Yaksha inscribed on it, is hoisted.

On the 2nd day, Surya (Sun) Vahanam Utsav is performed in the morning, and at night, Chandira (Moon) Vahanam Utsav is performed.

On the 3rd day, in the morning and at night, Devendhiran Vahanam (Head of all Navagrahas) Utsav is performed.

On the 4th day, in the morning and at night, a Nine-Headed Naga (Snake) Vahanam Utsav is performed.

On the 5th day, Hamsa (Swan) Vahanam Utsav is performed in the morning and at night.

On the 6th day, Yaanai (White Elephant) Vahanam Utsav is performed in the morning and at night.

On the 7th day, Vimanam Vahanam (God's Flight) Utsav is also performed in the morning and at night.

On the 8th day, Pallakku Utsav is performed in the morning and at night, Gudirai (Horse) Vahanam Utsav is performed.

On the 9th day, both during the morning and at night, Simmha (Lion) Vahanam Utsav is performed.

On the 10th day, in the morning, Mahabhishekam Utsav is held and at night, Dhvaja Avarohanam (Flag Unhoisting) is performed.

=== Pancha Kalyana Mahotsavam ===
The Pancha Kalyana Mahotsavam was conducted once every 12 years in the Alagramam Jain Temple. It was conducted in 1972, 1994, 2007 and 2023.

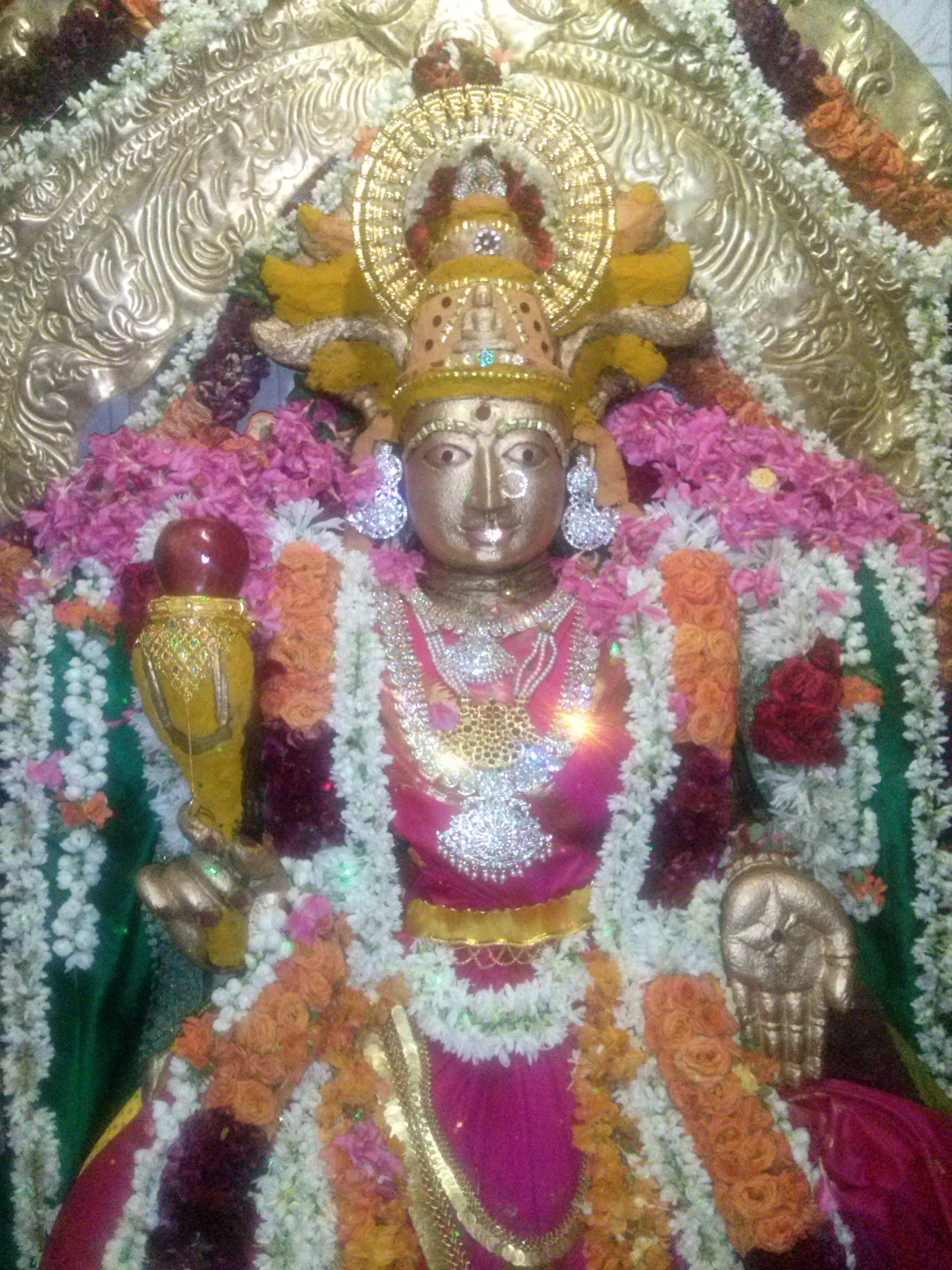
Sri Dharma Devi Amman

=== Other ===
Morning worshippers perform Abhishekam daily and conduct Ashtamanagala pujas every night. Special pujas and Vithanam also take place several times throughout the year.

== Gallery ==
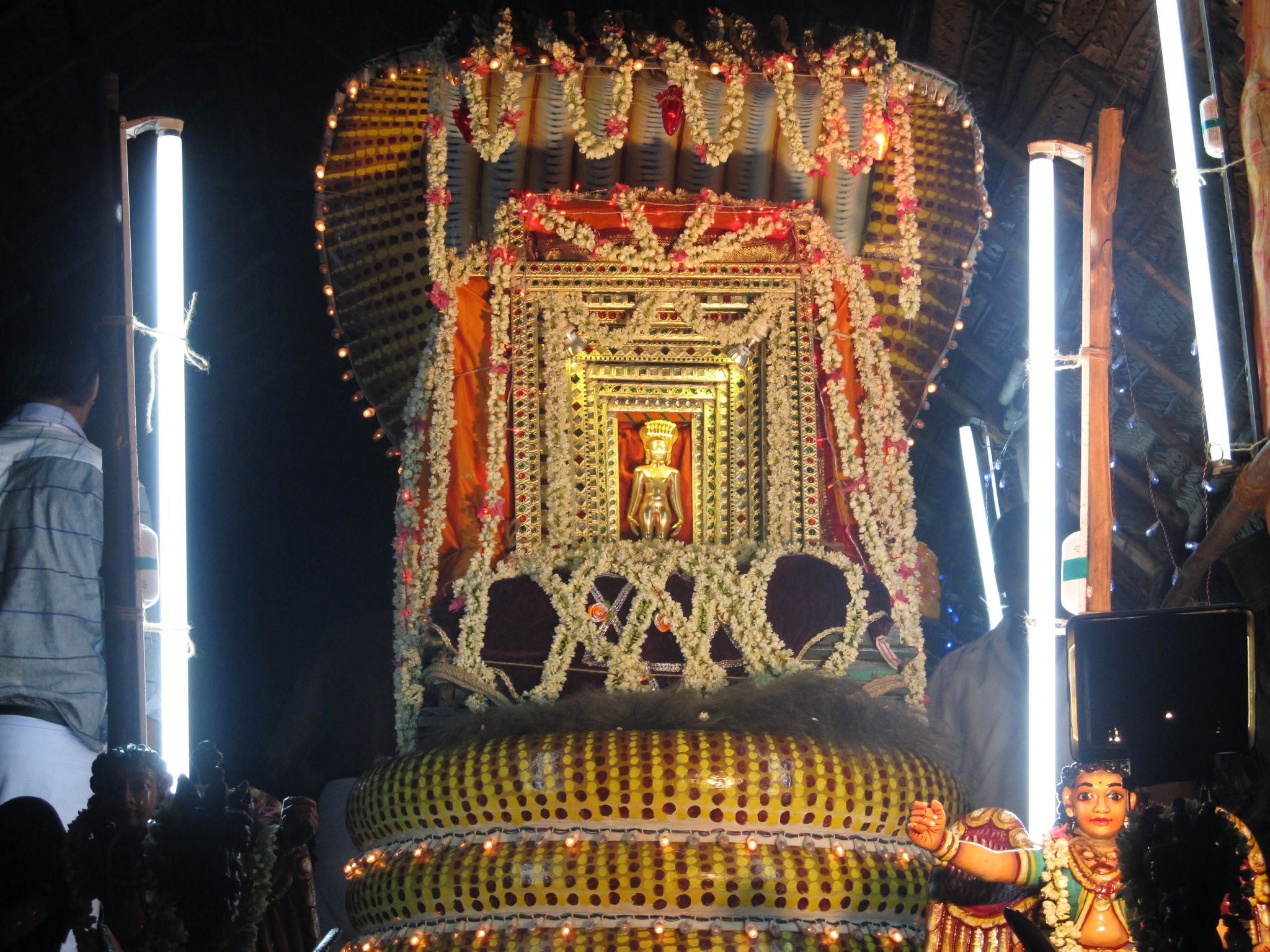
Naggha Vahanam

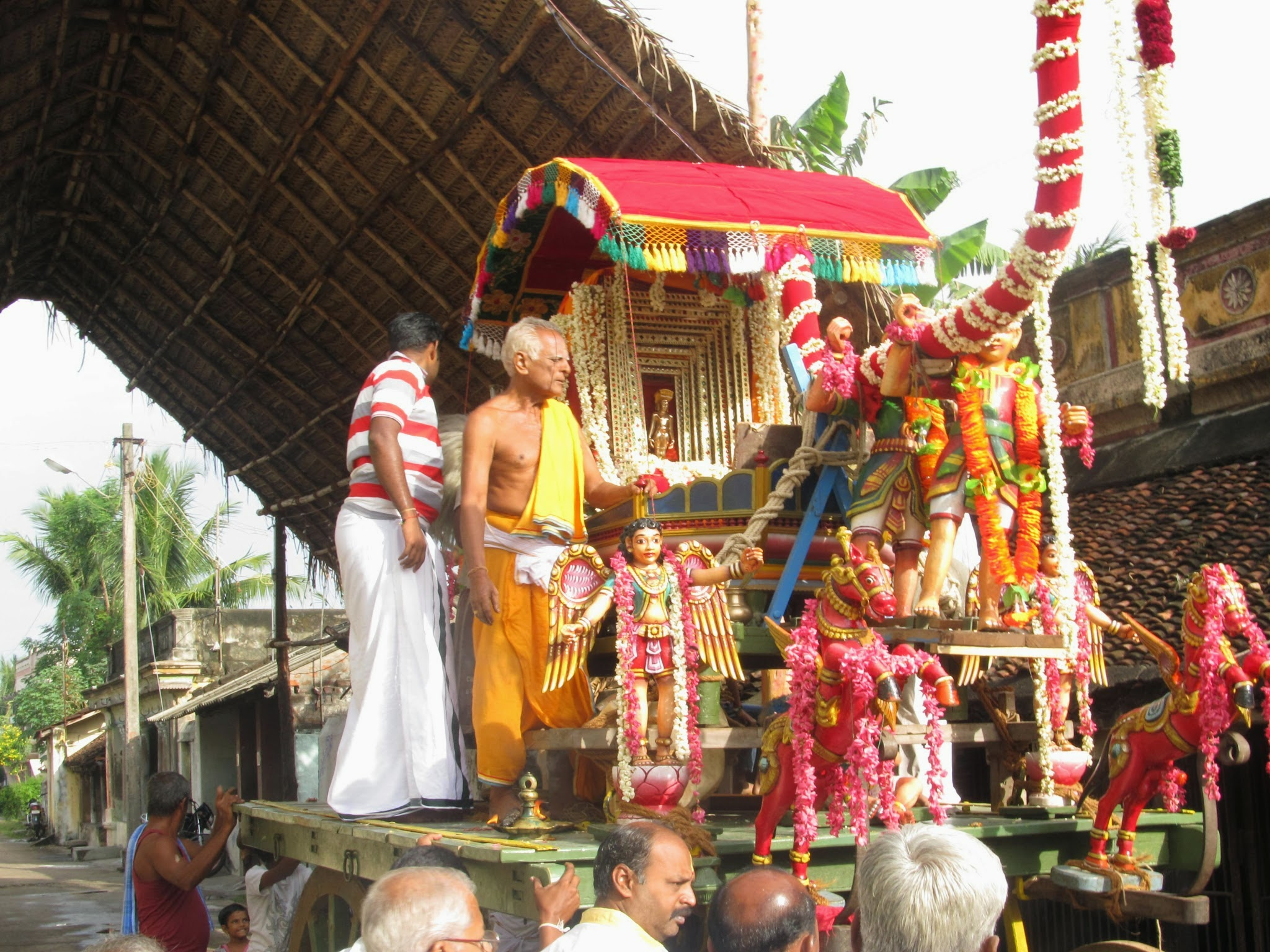
Pallakku

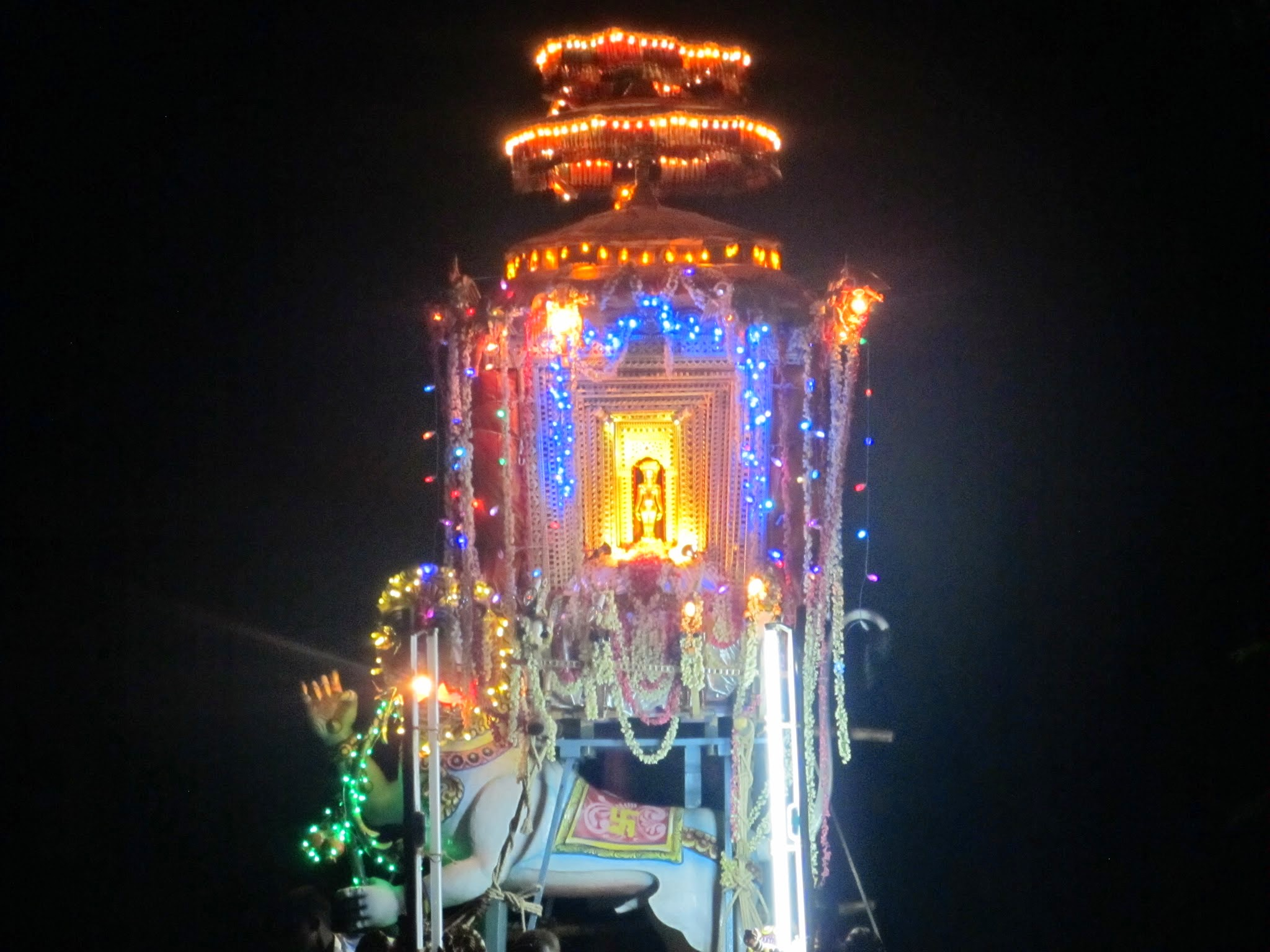
Lion Vahanam in Night

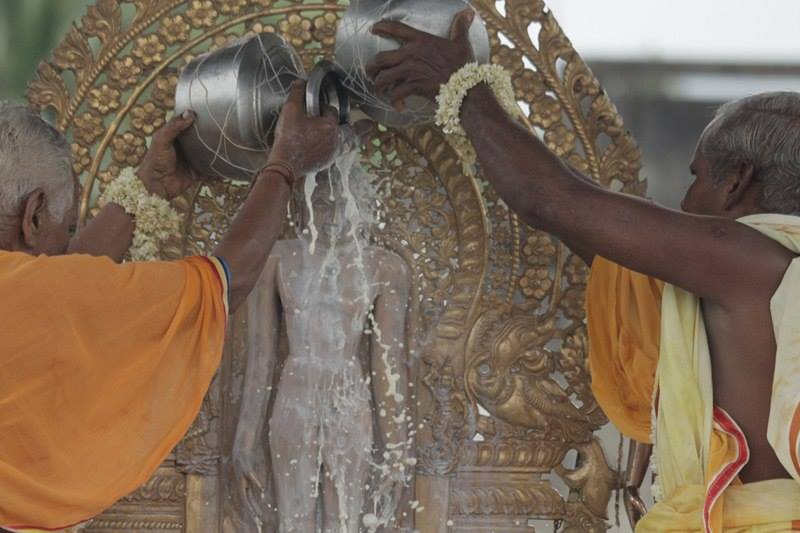
Abhishek

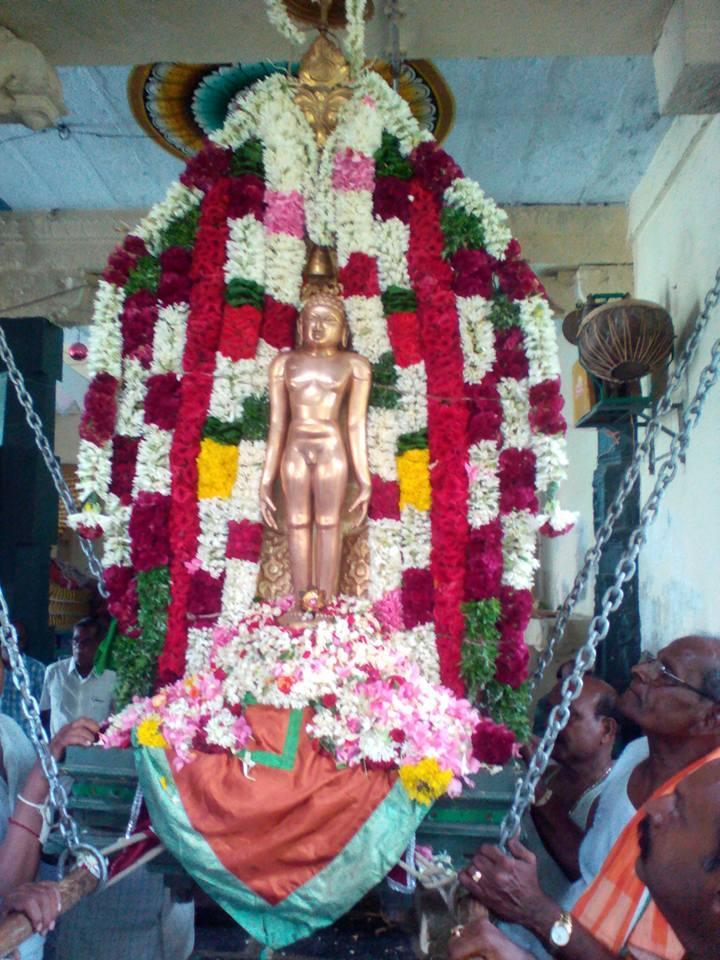
Lord Adhinath In Maha Abhisheagam

== See also ==
- Tirthankara
- Jainism
- Digambara
- Tamil Jain
- Jainism in India
- List of Jain temples
