= Thiruvithamcode =

- panchayat town
- Location in Tamil Nadu, India Thiruvithamcode (India)
- Country: India
- State: Tamil Nadu
- District: Kanniyakumari

Population (2001)
  - Total: 16,689

Languages
  - Official: Tamil
- Time zone: UTC+5:30 (IST)
- PIN: 629174
- Telephone code: Dialing code 04651
- Vehicle registration: TN75

Thiruvithamcode (also spelled Thiruvithancode), is a small panchayat town located in the Kanyakumari district of the Indian state of Tamil Nadu. Thiruvithamcode is about 20 km from Nagercoil and 2 km from Thuckalay.

== History ==
Nanjilnadu, which is the present Agasteeswaram and Thovalai taluks of the Kanyakumari district, was under the rule of Cheras. Idainadu comprising the present Kalkulam and Vilavancode taluks were under the rule of Cheras. When the power of Cheras declined due to the rise of Hoysalas and western Chalukyas, the Venad (descendants of the Cheras) took advantage of the situation and gradually established their hold on many areas of Nanjilnadu. The annexation commenced by Veera Kerala Varma was to a large extent continued by his successors and completed by 1115 A.D.

For about four centuries, Venad was ruled by kings. In 1729, Anizham Thirunal Marthanda Varma took control of the Travancore throne from his uncle, King Rama Varma. He defeated the forces of the Dutch East India Company under Eustachius De Lannoy in 1741 at the Battle of Colachel. Marthanda Varma expanded the kingdom towards north up to Aluva and established the state of Travancore. By this, the present day Kanyakumari District came to be known as Southern Travancore. Later, the capital was shifted from Padmanabhapuram (in present-day Kanyakumari District) to Thiruvananthapuram.

After Marthanda varma, Travancore kingdom was a principle state during the colonial period. The rule of the Travancore royals finally ceased in 1947 when Travancore had to join the independent Indian Union. In 1949, Kanyakumari district became part of the newly constituted Travancore-Cochin State. The people of Agasteeswarem, Thovalai, Kalkulam and Vilavancode Taluks, which formed the southern divisions of the former Thiruvananthapuram District, were predominantly Tamil-speaking and a popular agitation for merging the Tamil-speaking majority areas of Southern Travancore to Madras State (now Tamil Nadu) was started during this period and was intensified under the leadership of M.A. Nesamony, a prominent leader from the Nadar community who stoutly fought against the oppression of Nair community. They agitated for the merger of this area with Madras State. The States Reorganisation Commission also recommended a merger. Accordingly, the States Reorganisation Act of 1956 was passed and the Kanyakumari District was formed on 1 November 1956, annexing the four Taluks of Southern Travancore namely Agasteeswarem, Thovalai, Kalkulam. Thereby Thiruvithamcode, which formed part of Kalkulam Taluk in Southern Travancore, became part of Kanyakumari District in Tamil Nadu from 1 November 1956 onwards.

According to History of Travancore written by Shangunni Menon, the word "Thiruvithamcode" derives from "Thiru" meaning "prosperity", "Vithan" meaning "abode", and "Code" meaning "place".

Thiruvithamcode is thickly populated by Chettu/Chetty, Nadars and Muslim community.

== Demographics ==
=== Population ===
As of 2001 India census, Thiruvithankodu had a population of 16,689. Males constitute 49% of the population and females 51%. Thiruvithankodu has an average literacy rate of 82%, higher than the national average of 59.5%: male literacy is 84%, and female literacy is 79%. In Thiruvithankodu, 10% of the population is under 6 years of age.

=== Religion ===
More than 10 temples are present here. Thiruvithamcode has two churches. There are six Muslim mosques in Thiruvithamcode

== Landmarks ==
- Thiruvidhankodu Sri Parithipani Mahadevar temple
- Arulmigu Bhoothathan Temple, Thiruvethancode, 629174 TM042310 administered by Government of Tamil Nadu, Hindu Religious and Charitable Endowments Department
- St Mary's Orthodox Church (Thiruvithamcode Arappally) which is believed to be established by St Thomas in the first century AD, along with seven other churches (ezharappallikal) in Kerala.
- The Ascension Jesus Church, which is believed to have been established by St Francis Xavier.
- Periyanayaki Shrine (a shrine of Mary)
- Sankaramangalam Tharavadu, Thiruvithamcode

== Transport ==
Nadukadai and Chettikudi are the main junctions in Thiruvithamcode.

== Educational Institutions ==
=== College ===
The Muslim Arts College

=== Schools ===
==== Government ====
- Government higher Secondary School, Thiruvithamcode
  - Has classes from 1 to 12th in both English, Tamil & Malayalam Medium
  - The oldest school in Thiruvithamcode
- Government Primary School, near Vattam – has classes till 5th
- Government Malayalam School, opposite GHSS – has classes till 5th
- Anganvadi's are present in various locations in Thiruvithamcode

==== Private Schools ====
- Islamic Model Matriculation Higher Secondary School
  - Co-Educational – till 10th
  - More than 20 years since the school was started
  - Girls – 11,12
    - Groups available – Maths & Science Group
- The Oxford School
  - Co-Educational for all classes
  - Around 10 years since the school was started
  - CBSE and Matric – till 8th
  - Matric(Samacheer) – 9th, 10th
  - Higher Secondary – Maths & Science Group, Commerce & Accountancy Group

Apart from these, a couple of private schools are present for Kindergarten.
