= Padanthalumoodu =

Padanthalumoodu படந்தாலுமூடு
- Village Panchayat
- Location within Tamil Nadu Location within India
- Coordinates: 8°19′27″N 77°10′50″E
- Country: India
- State: Tamil Nadu
- District: Kanyakumari

Languages
  - Official: Tamil, English, Malayalam
- Time zone: UTC+5:30 (IST)
- PIN: 629 163
- Telephone code: 91-4651
- Vehicle registration: TN-74 & TN-75
- Literacy: 100%

Padanthalumoodu is located in Kanyakumari District of Tamil Nadu. The area of Padanthalumoodu lies in the taluk of Vilavancode and has a Sub Post Office. Padanthalumoodu officially lies in the postal division of Kanniyakumari, postal region of Madurai and postal circle of Tamil Nadu. It is located at 5.5 km from Marthandam and about 750 km south-southwest of capital city Chennai.

== History ==
Originally the name was Padantha-alumoodu (படந்த ஆலுமூடு) because there were once a huge Banyan tree, circled outskirts of the village and people believed to guard it and latter when NH47 road was laid between Nagercoil and Trivandrum and by climate changes the Banyan was lost. People used this Banyan tree for Trade and Learning. Due to time the original name joined together from Padantha-alumoodu (Village of huge Banyan) to Padanthalumoodu (படந்தாலுமூடு). Presently one Banyan Tree stands at the Junction known as Aalumoodu (ஆலுமூடு) also called as Karuppattiyalumoodu.

== Culture ==
People of this town generally know both Tamil and Malayalam languages, because of its proximity to the border state of Kerala. Tamil and Malayalam are widely spoken by the people. The culture is a mixture of Tamil and Malayalam culture and traditions. Hinduism and Christianity are the major religions in the town.

== Youth wing ==
- Nethaji Thentral Youth Wing (நேதாஜி தென்றல் இளைஞர் இயக்கம்) is the active youth wing in CHANTHAVILAI (Padanthalumoodu). They help poor people and encourage the youngsters to achieve something in life. There will be yearly celebrations conducted on August 15 (Independence Day) by the youngsters.

== Major festivals ==
- Onam, Deepavali, Christmas, Ramzan, Newyear, Easter, Independence day and all the respective religious festivals.

== Sports ==
- Cricket & Kabaddi is the major games played around Padanthalumoodu.

== IT Companies ==
- Dunlark Technologies Private Limited is a Leading IT Company Located in Padanthalumoodu since 2013 - Shut down due to losses

== Temples ==
Padanrthalumoodu has a few temples including Ambadi Shri Krishna Swamy Temple and Meenachal sree krishnaswamy Temple

== Schools ==
- TCK Higher Secondary School, Padanthalumoodu
- Sacred Heart Primary School, Kamaraj Nager, Padanthalumoodu
- Sacred Heart Matriculation Higher Secondary School, Padanthalumoodu

== College ==
- Grace College Of Nursing, Padanthalumoodu
- Grace College of Education, Padanthalumoodu
