= Chitharal Jain Monuments and Bhagavati Temple =

Group of Hindu and Jain temples in India

Chitharal Jain Temple and Bhagavati Temple
- Chitharal Malai Kovil
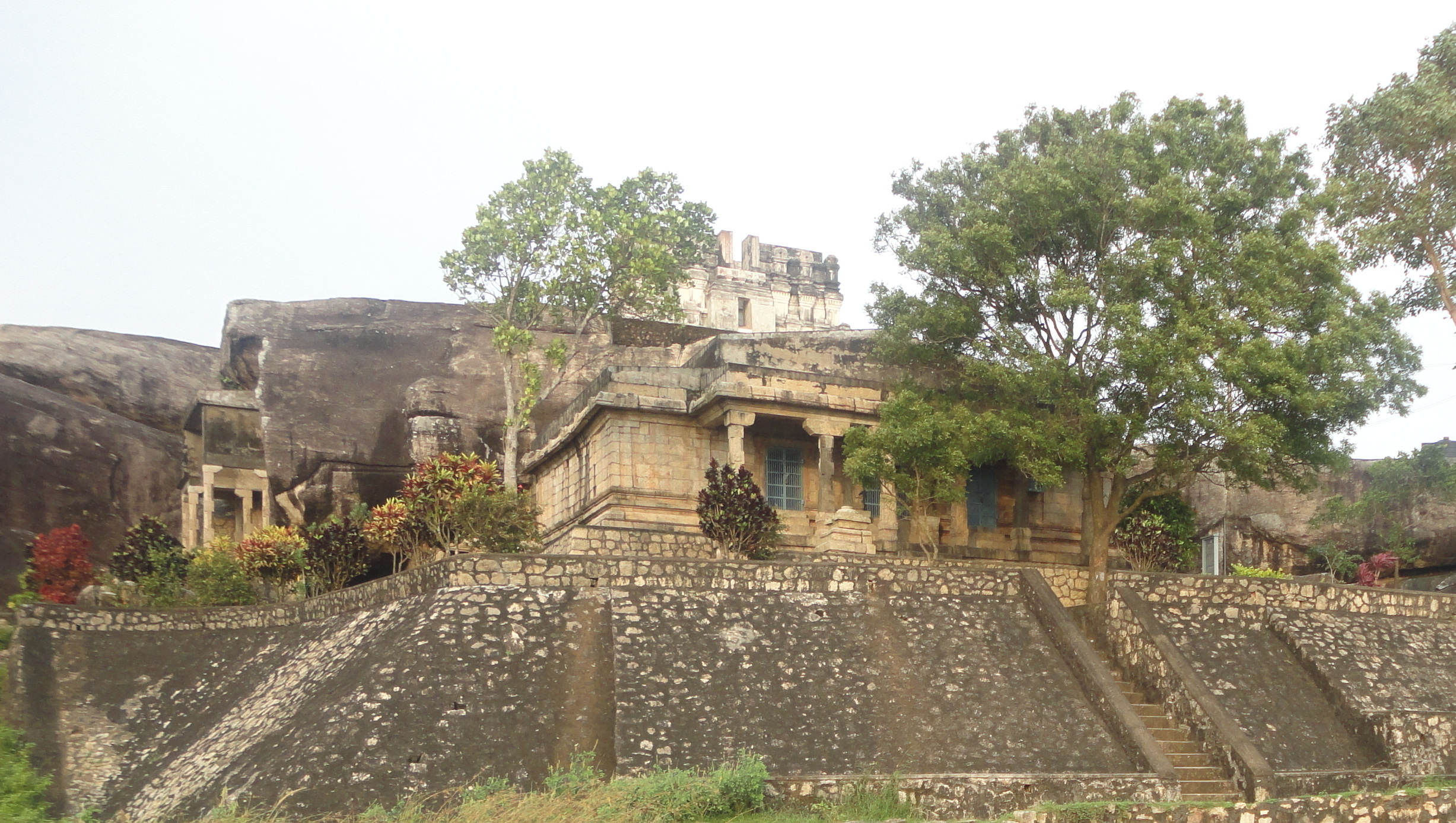

Religion
- Affiliation: Jainism
- Deity: Tirthankaras and Bhagavati

Location
- Location: Chitharal, Kanyakumari district, Tamil Nadu
- Interactive map of Chitharal Jain Temple and Bhagavati Temple
- Coordinates: 8°19′57.1″N 77°14′18.2″E

Architecture
- Established: 9th–century CE
- Temples: 2 (Jain, Hindu)

The Chitharal Jain Temple and Bhagavati Temple are located near Chitharal village in Kanyakumari district, Tamil Nadu, India. They consist of stone beds with inscriptions, and two monuments – one rock cut Jain temple with outer wall reliefs and one Hindu goddess temple next to it that is a combination of rock-cut and stone that was added during the reign of Vikramaditya Varaguna Pandya. The monuments are from the 9th century CE.

== Location ==
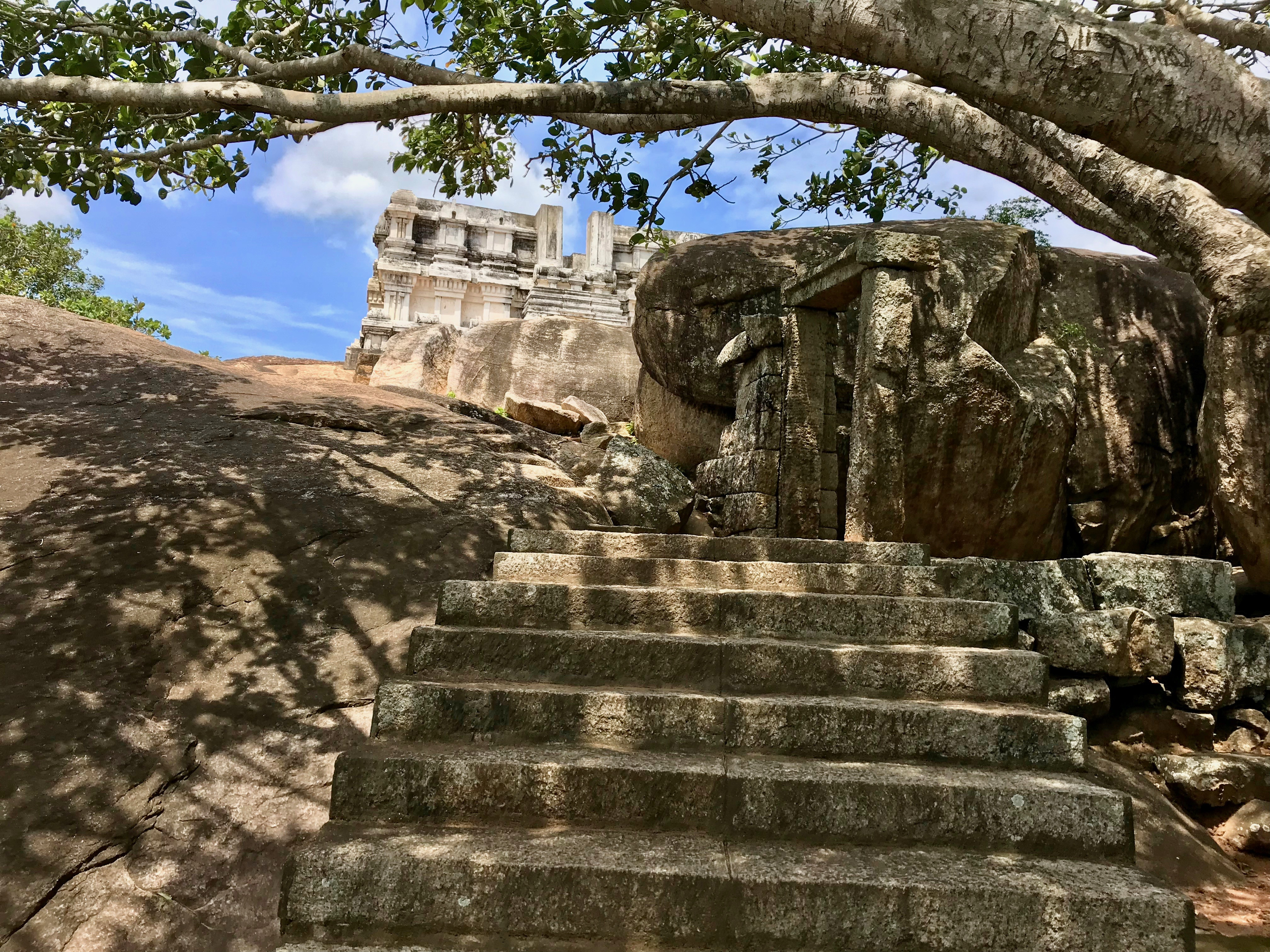
Chitaral monuments are on the top of a stone hillock.

The Chitharal Jain Monuments and Bhagavati Temple are situated near the southern tip of peninsular India, about 55 kilometers northwest of Kanyakumari (Highway 66) and about 4 kilometers northeast of Kuzhithurai town (Highway 90). They are on the Thiruchanattu Malai (Thiruchanattu hillocks) locally known as Chokkanthoongi Hills. The monuments are on the north side of Chitharal village. The monuments' entrance is marked and is under the management of ASI Thrissur circle. From the entrance board, they can be reached by roughly hewn steps in rocks uphill, midst cashew, coconut and rubber-plantation trees.

== History ==
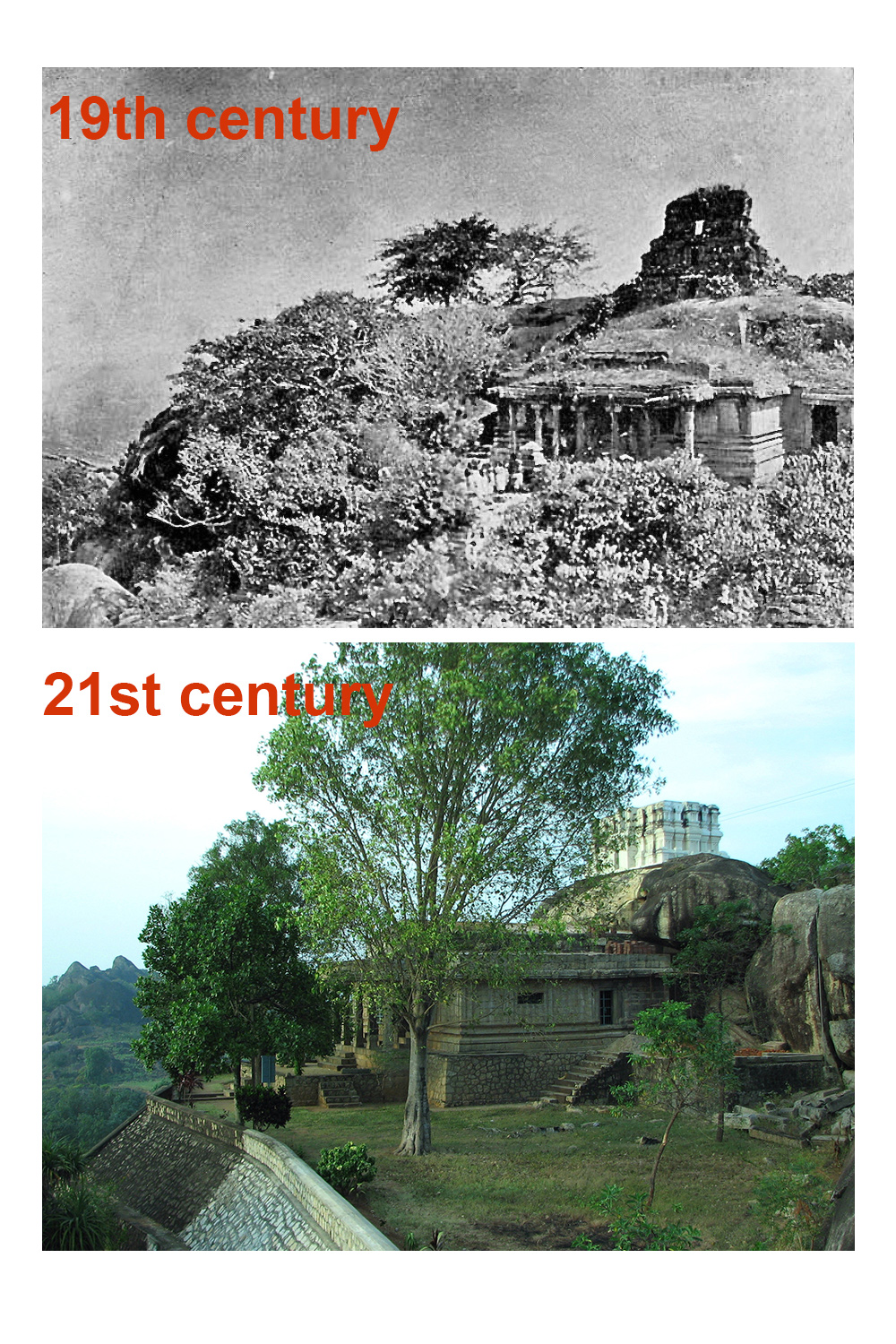
9th century Chitaral Jain Monuments and Bhagavati Temple over time. The ruins in 19th-century barely had a Vimana left. The monument has been restored.

=== Tiruchchāraṇattumalai ===
Inscriptions found at the site and elsewhere such as the Kalugumalai Jain Beds suggest that the history of these monuments extend over the 1st-millennium CE, with some inscriptions in the Hindu temple dateable in the 13th-century. In these historical inscriptions and literature, this site is referred to as Thiruchāraṇathupalli, or just Tiruccāraṇam. The hillock is also referred to as Tiruchchāraṇattu malai, which means "the hill holy to the Chāraṇas" (Jain ascetics).

The site consists of beds and two monuments. The older rock-cut Jain beds with inscriptions and drip-ledges among the boulders at the site are the earliest Jain monument in the southernmost part of India. The Archaeological Survey of India states that the beds are from first century BCE to sixth century CE. The cave temple and main Jain monument is from the 9th-century, with three sanctums that has always had Jain iconography – Parsvanatha (left), Mahavira and Padmavati since they were carved in-situ from the stone and have not been damaged. Next to it is a Hindu temple dedicated to goddess Bhagavati (Parvati) which was likely added after the 9th-century, and expanded with mandapa and other Hindu temple architectural elements through the 13th-century based on epigraphic evidence of donors.

The Jain beds and temple are Digambara Jain monuments. They are one of many found in Tamil Nadu from a period prior to the 14th-century. Jainism was active in this region, as evidence by inscriptions and literature in the Madurai region by about 1st-century BCE, and more broadly by the Pallava era, including those from the era of King Mahendravarman I (early 7th-century) famous for sponsoring Jain monuments as well as Hindu sites such as the Mahabalipuram monuments.

According to T. A. Gopinatha Rao, the inscription on the southern side says Gunandagi-kurattigal, the disciple of Arattanemi - Bhatariyar of Peravakkudi, presented Bhatariyar of Tiruchchanam malai with some golden ornament during the 28th year of reign of Vikramaditya Varaguna. There is much evidence and an established chronology about the Hindu monarch Vikramaditya of Ay dynasty, states Gopinath Rao, and this helps date this temple to the 9th-century. The inscription is Tamil language in Vatteluttu script.

The Bhagavati temple was an active place for worship for the locals Hindus, when the entire site's significance and antiquity was discovered by archaeologists. However, their general condition was in ruins as attested by the archived 19th-century photographs of the site taken by Gopinath Rao. He remarked that the outside was ruined, but the cave temple was mostly intact. The exception being the murals and plastered images which had been damaged along with the Padmavati Devi image. Gopinath Rao states that these were "destroyed by [art] thieves" in late 19th-century or early 20th-century. The original statues of Mahavira and Parswanatha remain in good condition.

The monument has been cleaned up, many parts of it rebuilt and restored, particularly the partial Vimana on top of the cave temple. The site has a natural "heart shaped" pond below the temple and provides a picturesque view of the farmlands and valley villages.

== Description ==
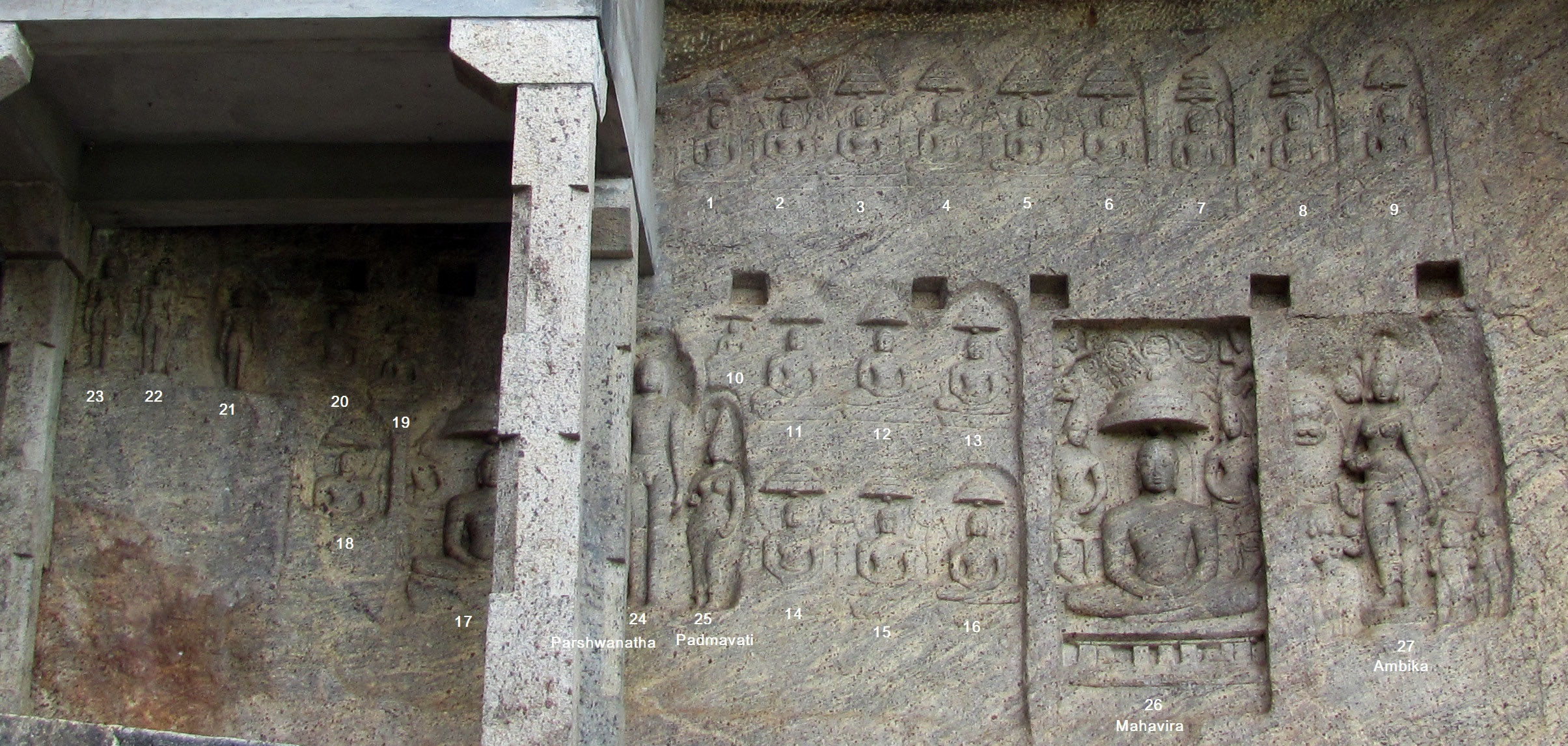
Jain bas-relief on the north side outer wall of the cave temple.

The monuments are reached by roughly hewn steps in rocks and the narrow entrance between them. A natural cavern formed by overhanging rock has many bas-relief sculptures of Jain Tirthankaras. This is the north side and the outer wall of the Jain cave temple. It is visible to the visitors as they approach the temple. The reliefs of Parsvanatha and Padmavati are standing figures canopied by multi-hooded cobra and with attendant smaller figures of Yaksha.

Most figures in the bas-relief are seated in ardha-padmasana pose in each niches with three tiered parasol. These are many of the other 24 Tirthankaras. To the left, three standing figures are also of Tirthankaras. The central niche has a figure of Mahavira with three tiered parasol, chhatratrayi chaitya with a tree above it and attendant figures. There is another female figure of Ambika in a niche next to it. It has two attendant figures below and a lion. All major niches has flying figures of Vidyadharas (upholders of knowledge). There is a short inscription below the seat of each relief. This mentions the name of an ascetic or a donor who sponsored the carving with their place of residence in Tamil language and Vatteluthu script. Based on the script styles in the inscription, these were added over several centuries. The site must have been an active Jain site at least till middle of thirteenth century.

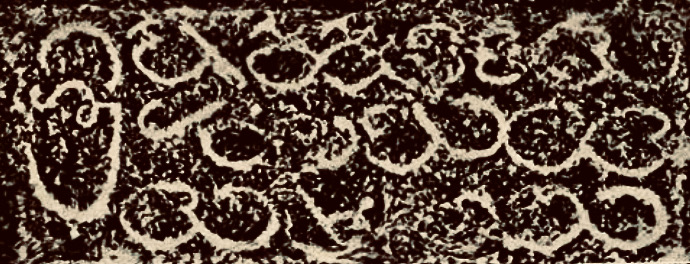
The inscription below Padmavati bas relief

The Jain temple was carved out of a natural cave. The inside of the temple has a pillared mandapa, and three sanctums. The pillared hall and sanctums retain Jain motifs. To the south side of the Jain temple is the Hindu temple. It coopts parts of the Jain structure and treats the artwork associated with the Padmavati Devi as part of Hindu tradition. The Hindu temple includes a mandapam, a varandah corridor and a balipeetham with a kitchen (madappalli) which is carved into a natural overhanging rock. In the Hindu temple, several inscriptions were discovered over time, on steps, pillars and walls as the temple was cleaned up and restored. These discoveries have led scholars such as Gopinath Rao to better date the temple, its history and revise their conjectures on the relationship between Jain and Hindu community in Tamil Nadu.

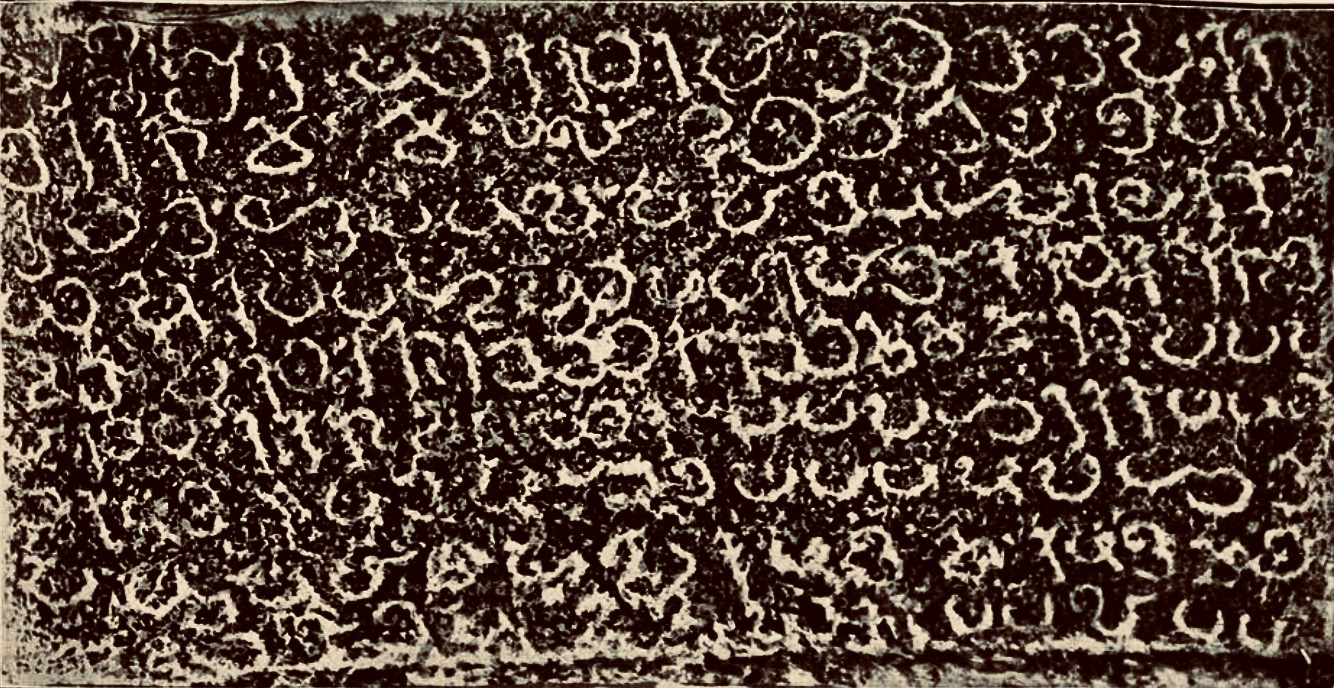
The inscription of Vikramaditya Varaguna at the site in Tamil language and Vatteluthu script.

According to Gopinatha Rao, the Hindus of 13th-century or earlier were already treating the southern side of this site as sacred to them, and making gifts and offerings to the temple. Their prayers have included Padmavati as a goddess in their pantheon, making the site an active place for pilgrimage thereafter for some seven centuries. More substantial inscriptions at this site have been discovered on the Hindu temple side. For example, there is one Tamil inscription in Vatteluthu script on the rock adjacent to the Hindu temple, which states that a "Narayan of Rajavallapuram donated money to the Bhagavati temple" in "Ko 425". The latter is equivalent to about 1250 CE of the Georgian calendar. Further, given the Hindu sculptures carved and other architectural features on the Hindu temple side, the structure could be dated to pre-13th century. This and the Hindu name of "Narayan" led Gopinatha Rao and other scholars to initially propose that the Jain temple was "converted" into Hindu temple by mid 13th-century.

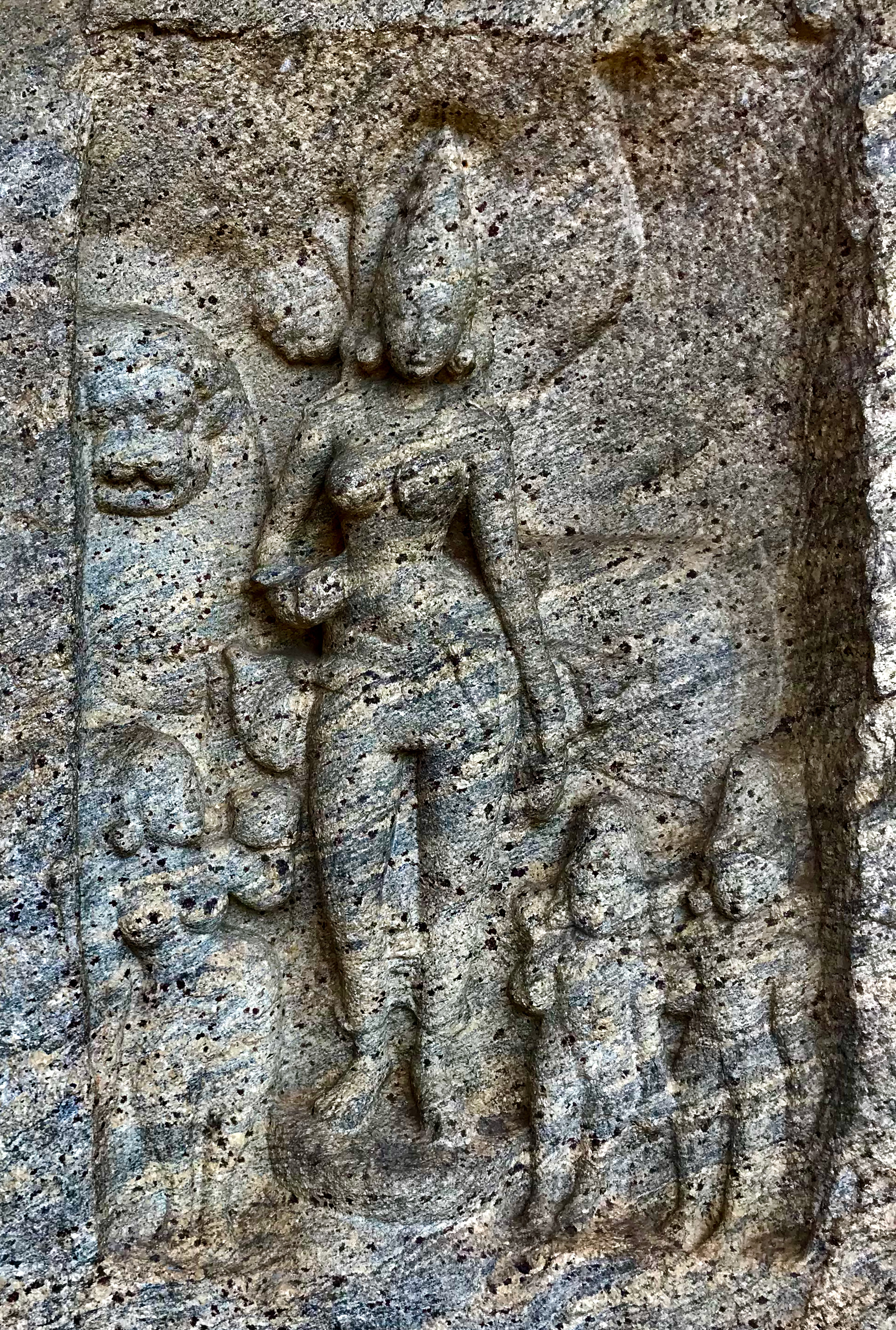
A Jaina Devi is depicted at Chitaral with lion behind her back and other iconographic elements found with Durga-Bhagavati in the Hindu pantheon.

Another inscription was discovered a bit later on the kitchen steps of the Hindu temple. It stated that "Narayanan Kalikan alias Dharmachetti-nayinar of the city of Tirukkudakkarai made certain arrangements" to ensure certain services in the "Bhagavati temple" on the "17th of the month of Medam in the year Ko 584". This approximately corresponds to 1373 CE. So, the Hindu temple was active in the 14th-century. Similar inscriptions found in the Hindu temple, led Gopinatha Rao to reconsider the early hypothesis and write that he was a bit misled by the Hindu name Narayan and "I now think that it [conjecture of conversion] is a mistake". Hindus did not "convert" the Jain temple by erasing or destroying it, or refashioning the entire site into a Hindu architecture. Rather it is more likely, states Gopinatha Rao, that the Hindus of the early 2nd-millennium centuries revered the site because they always considered Padmavati as part of their pantheon, left the rest of the cave temple alone, and preserved the bas-relief and Tirthankaras of the Jains. The site was built during the reign of the Hindu monarch Vikramaditya Varaguna, states Gopinatha Rao.

The longer inscriptions about gifts and donations at this site were directed to Padmavati with Hindu religious icons, even during the centuries when Jains were also visiting and adding to the bas-relief. The added artwork to the Jain side here is in striking accordance with Hindu text on architecture – Manasara, a Sanskrit text that dedicates a chapter on proper way to design and carve Jaina iconography. The site, therefore, does not reflect a conflict and conversion, rather a cooperation and overlap between the two ancient Indian religious faiths.

According to Stella Kramrisch and other scholars, Jain iconography is found to co-exist with Hindu iconography in Chitharal and other temples built in the Travancore region of South India. The nearby Nagaraja Temple in Nagercoil – which gives the city its name – for example, has been a Hindu temple. The temple included during its construction the reliefs of many Hindu deities and those belonging to Jainism tradition as well. Reliefs of Mahavira, Parsvanatha and Padmavati Devi are seen on the pillars of the Nagaraja temple mandapa along with Krishna, Vishnu, and others.

== Management and preservation ==
This is a centrally protected monument (N-TN-T2) maintained by Thrissur Circle of Archaeological Survey of India since 1964. It is inscribed as Bhagawati temple and Jaina bas-relief.

== Gallery ==
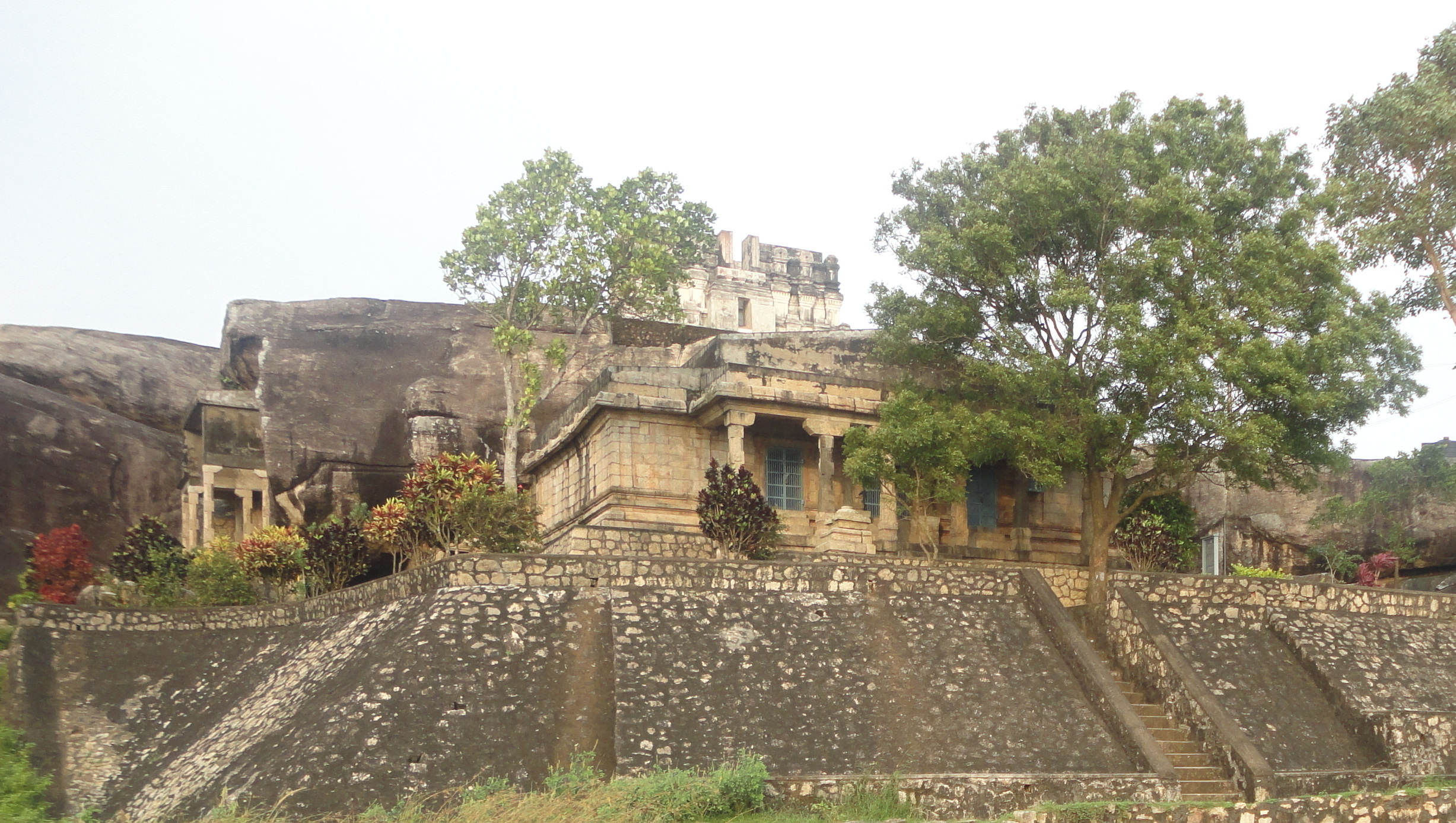
The pillars set on the left mark the Jain temple entrance, on the right is the Hindu temple entrance

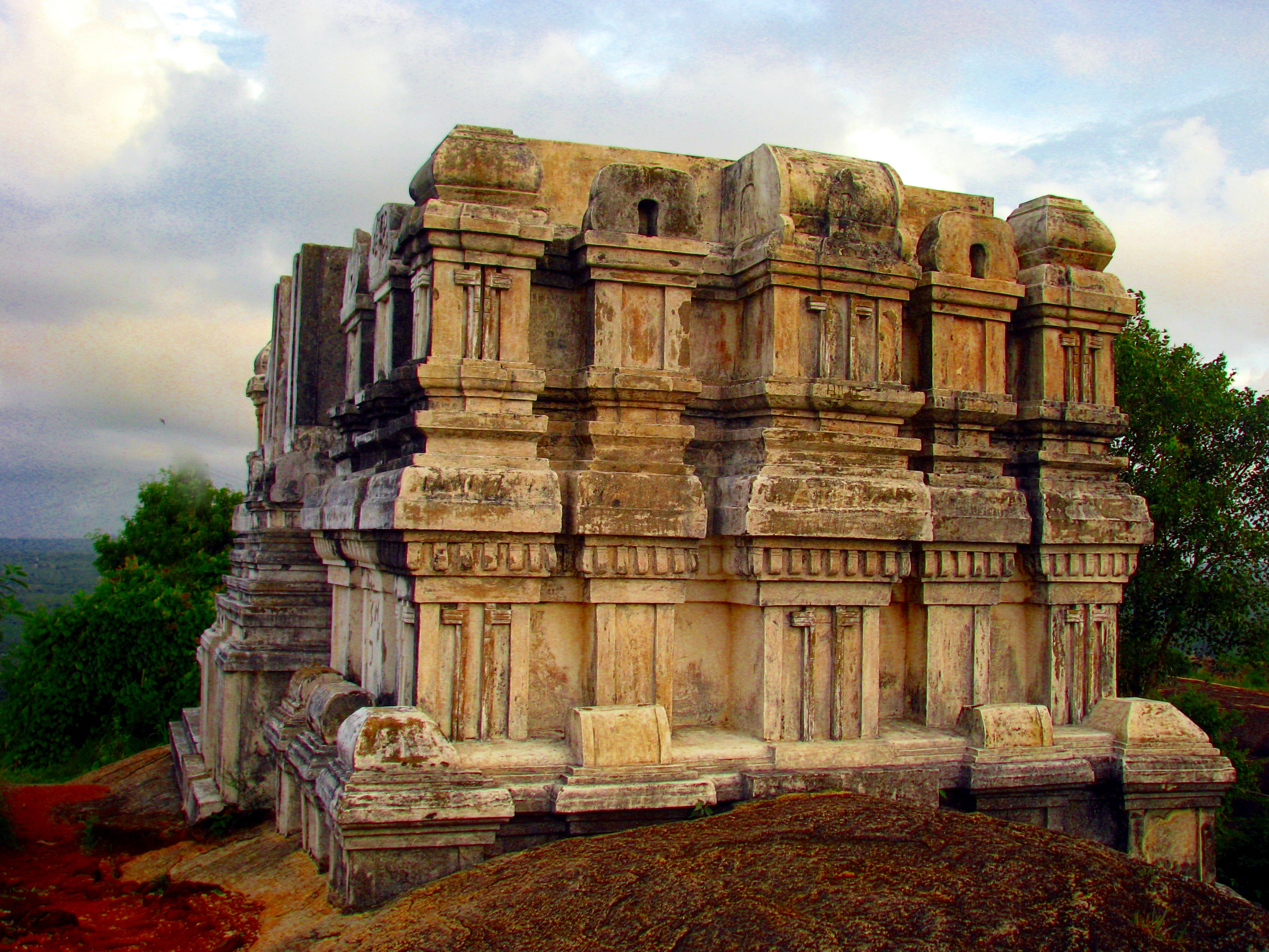
Restored Vimana

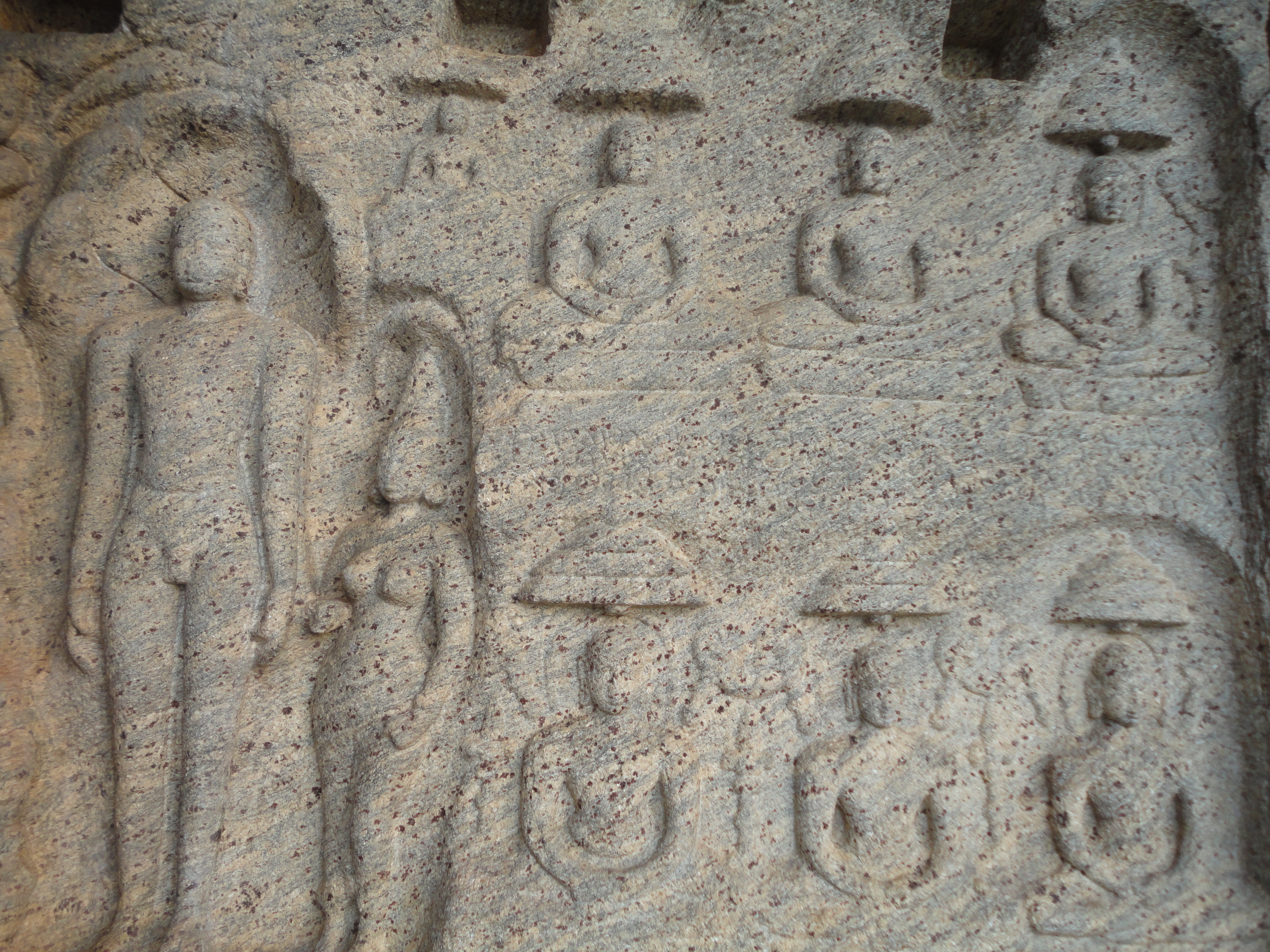
Jain bas relief

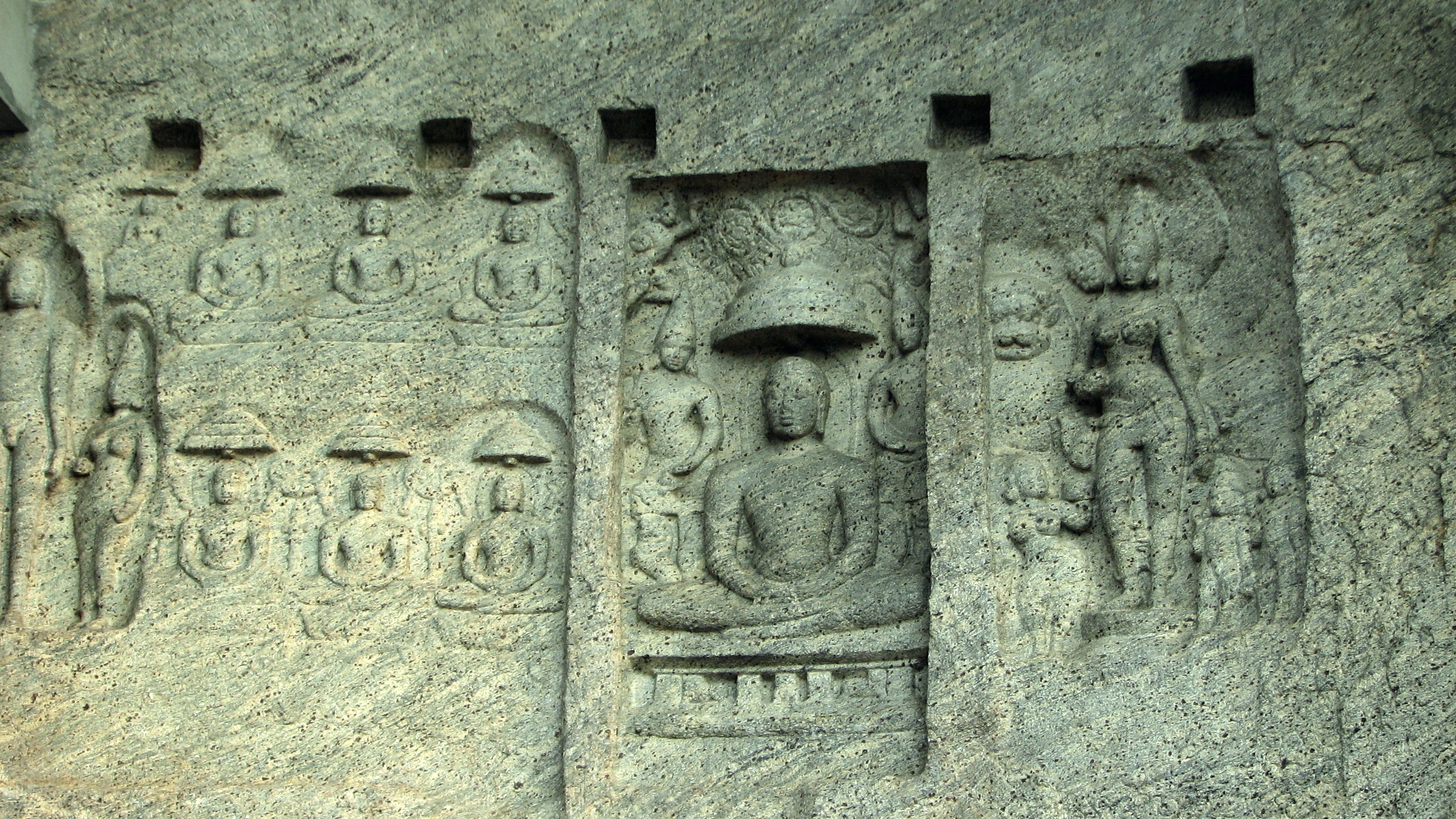
Jain bas-relief

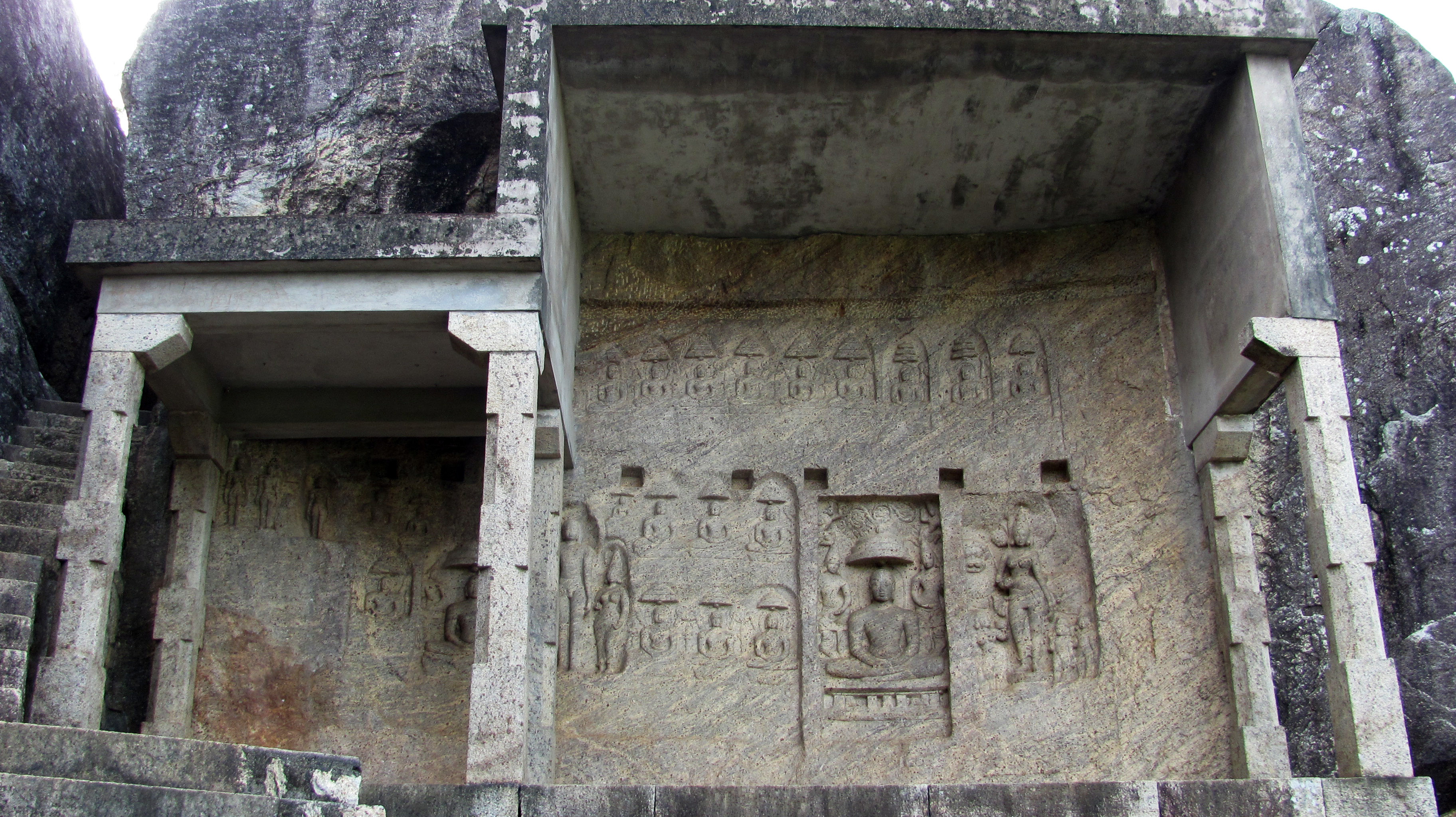
Jain bas-relief

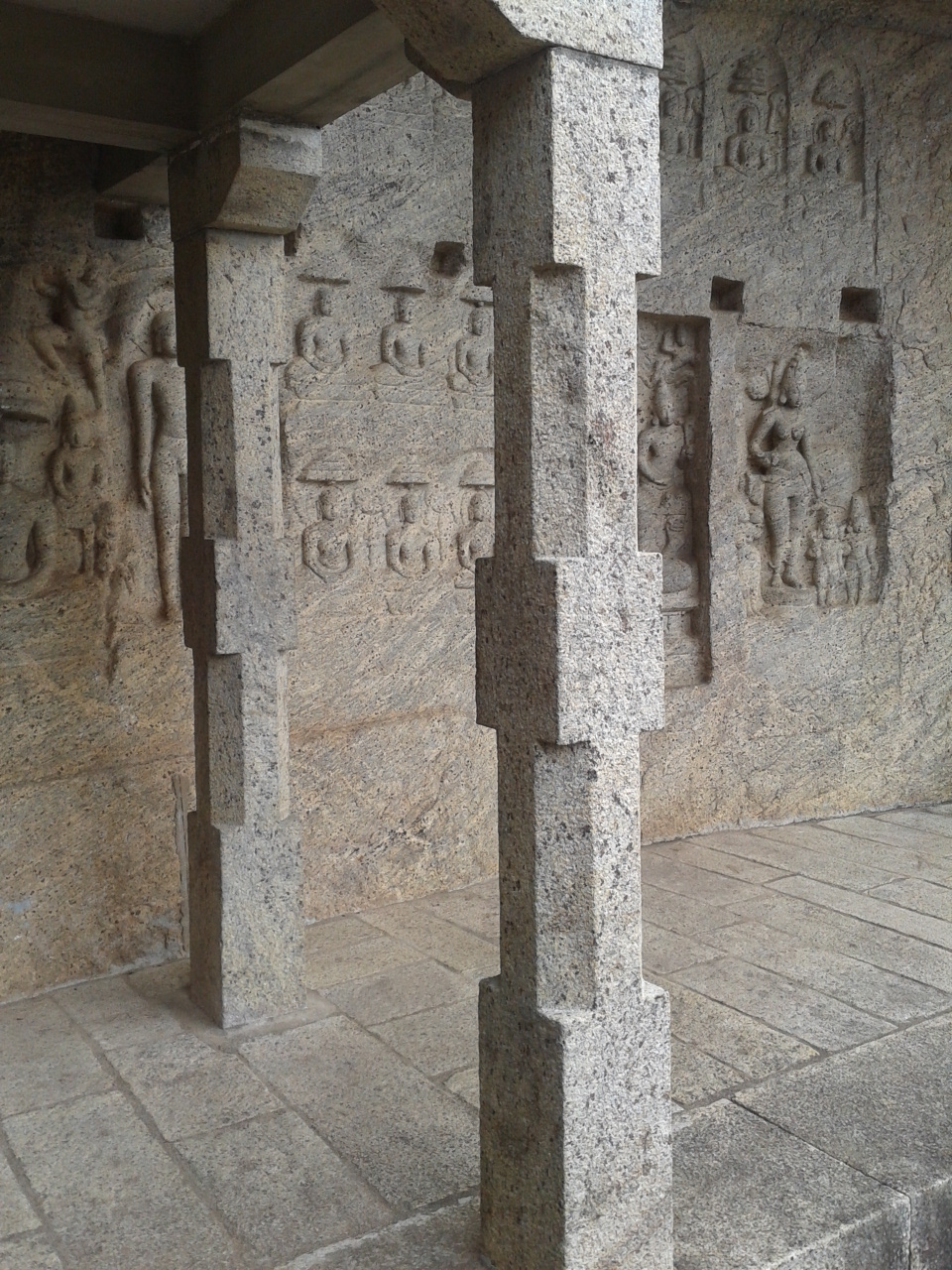
Jain bas-relief

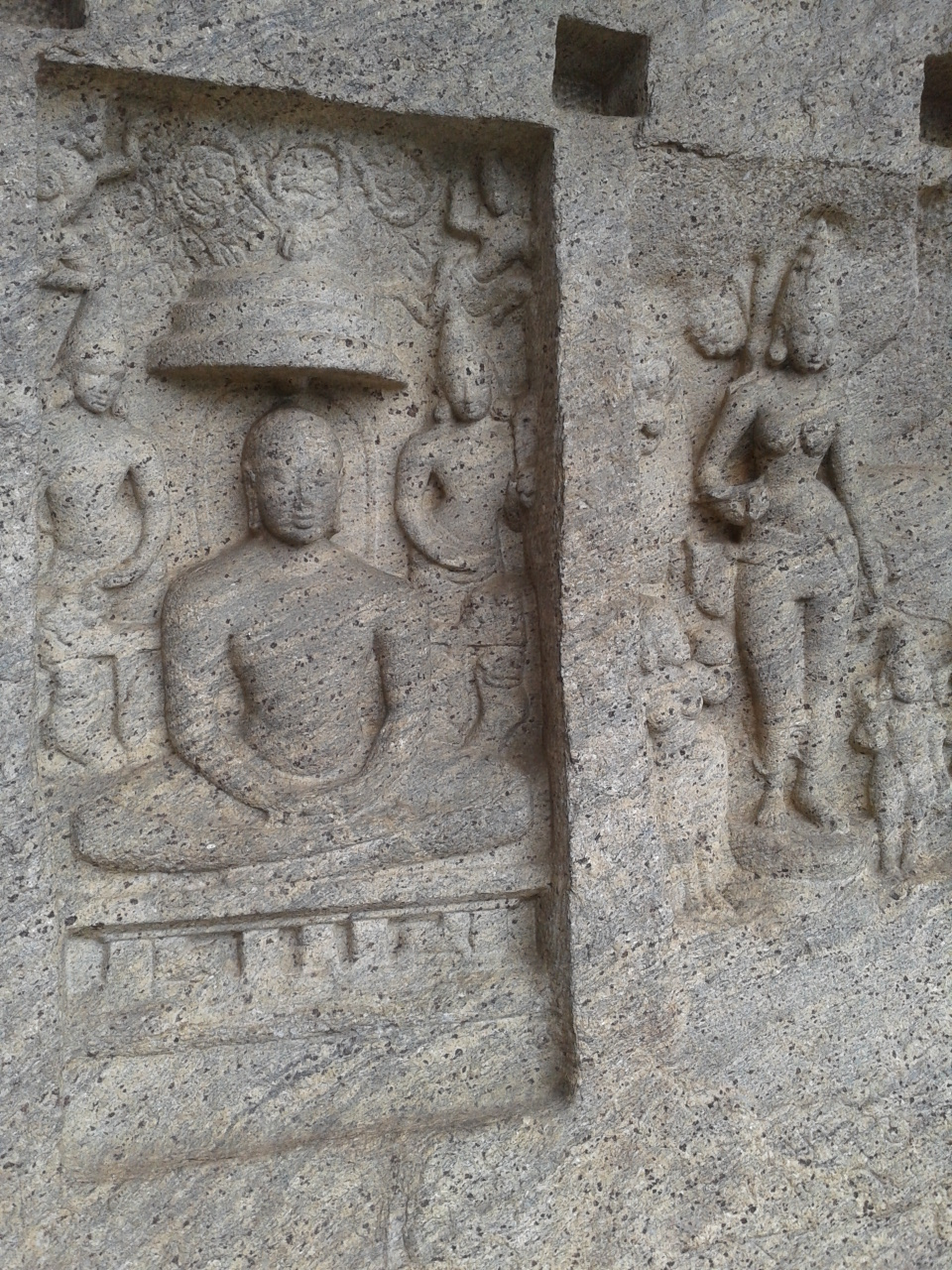
Jain bas-relief

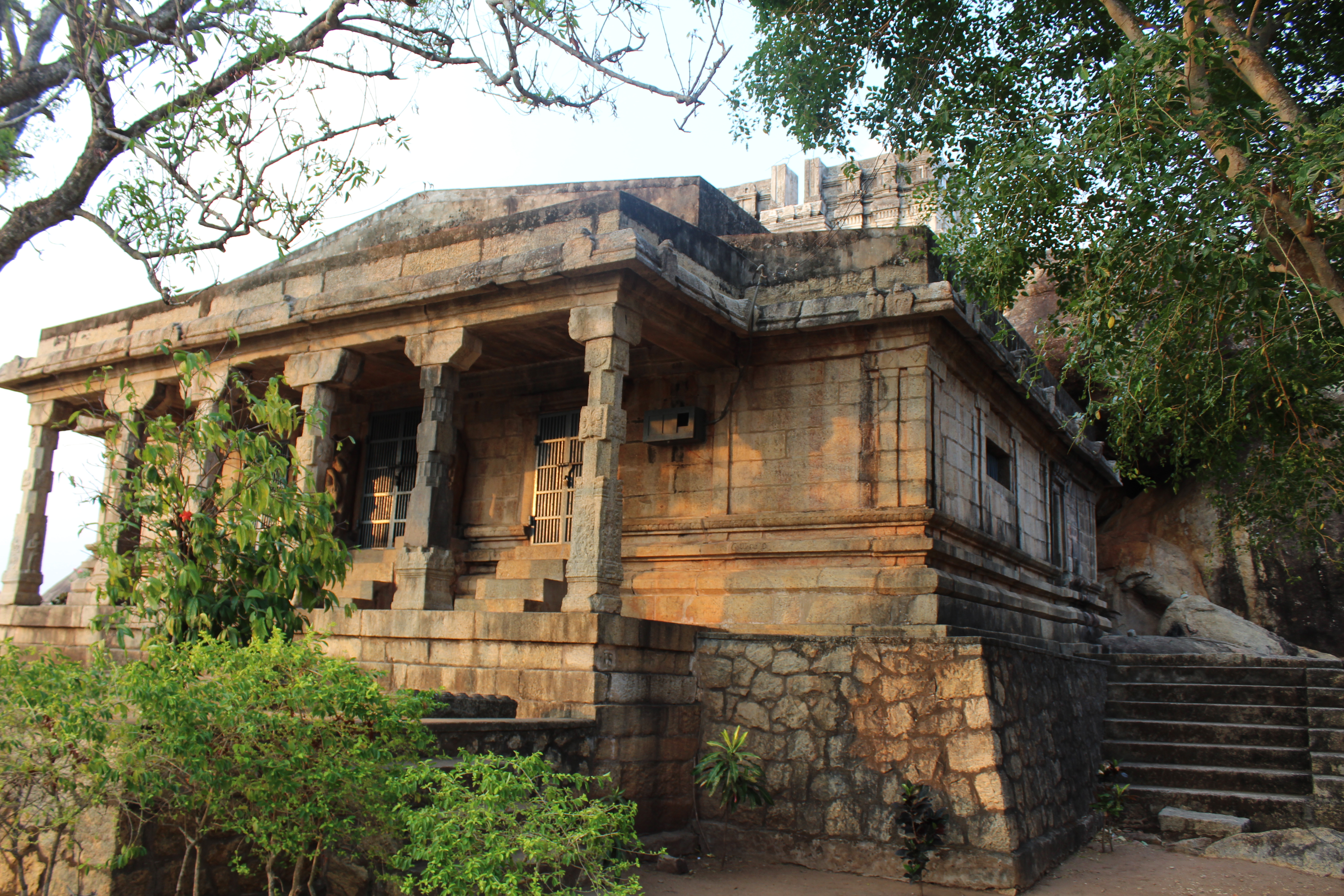
Entrance of the Jain temple

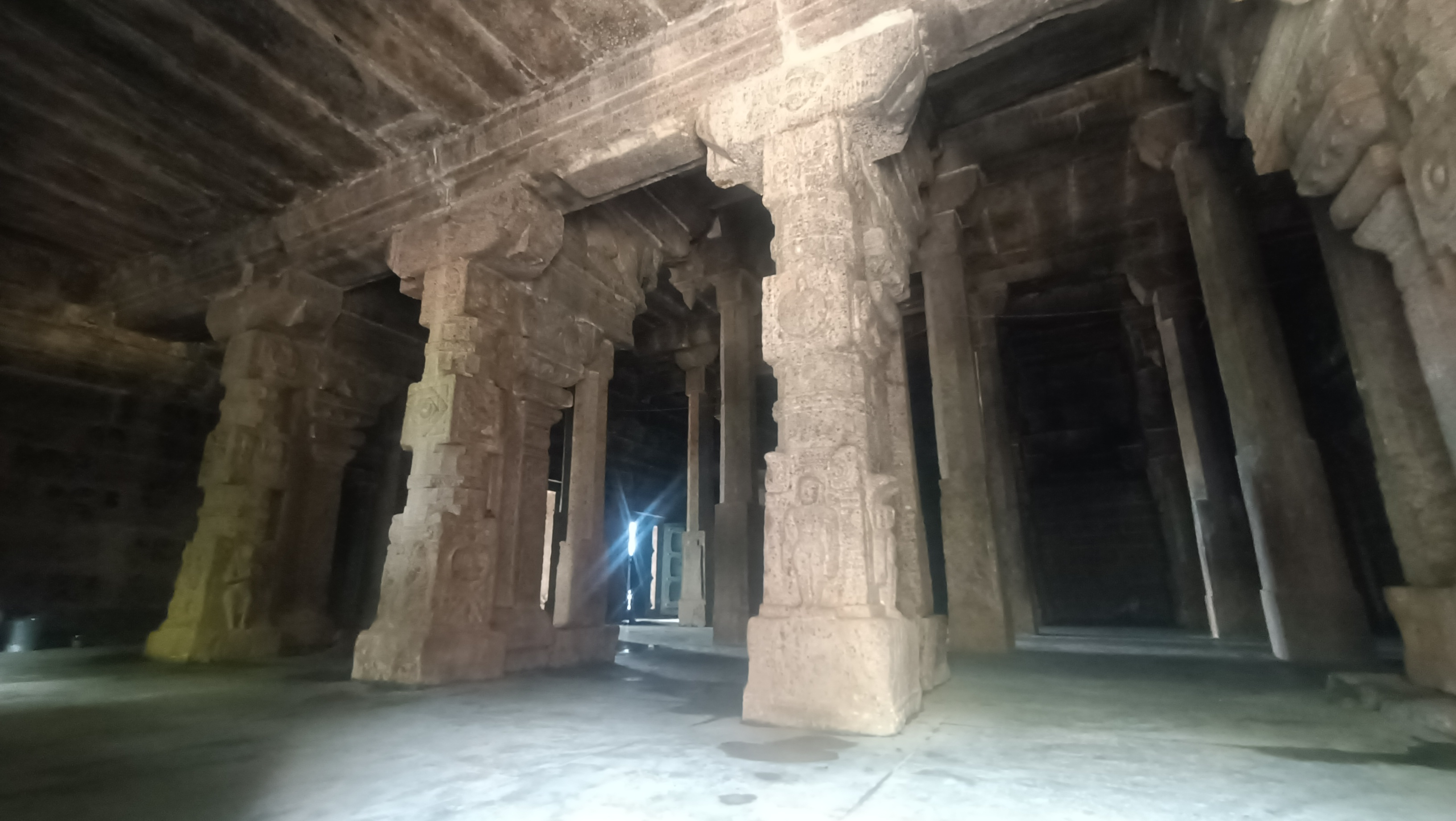
Inside the temple

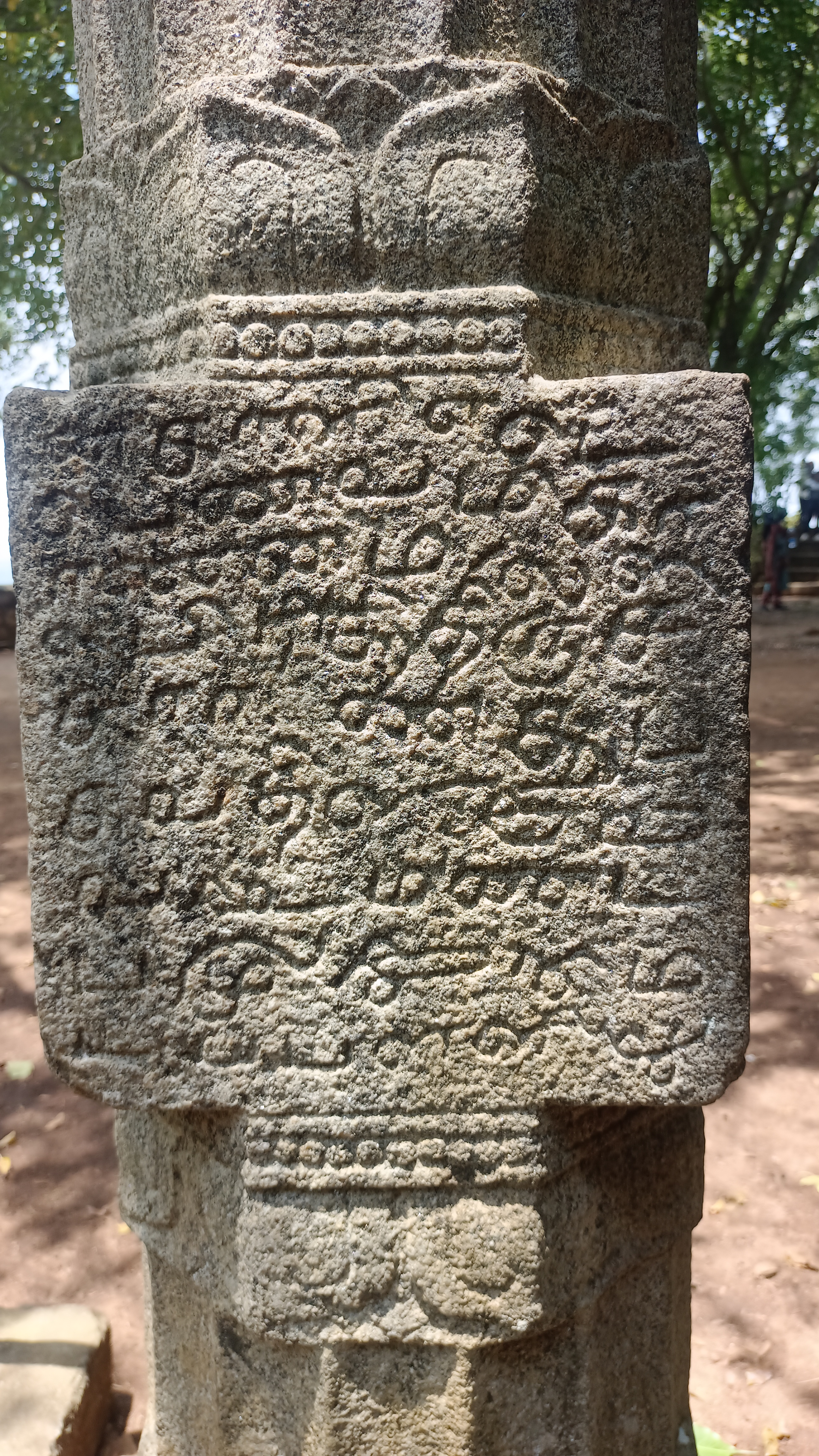
Inscriptions

== See also ==
- Jainism in Kerala
- Jainism in Tamil Nadu
- Thirucharanathumalai
