= Thirucharanathumalai =

- Location in Tamil Nadu, India
- 8.125°N 77.565°E
- Location: Kanyakumari, India

Thirucharanathumalai (Tiruchchāraṇattumalai) is a hillock located in Chitharal village 6 km (3.7 mi) from Marthandam, and 55 km (34 mi) from Kanyakumari. Tiruchchāraṇattumalai, which means 'holy hill of the Chāraṇas', derives its name on account of its association with the Chāraṇas, a class of sages who had attained mastery over nature. It was originally a Jaina place of worship and assembly centre.

On the top of the hill under a path that seems naturally hanging there in a temple with mandapam, corridor and balipeetam with a madappalli (kitchen). There are 3 sanctums housing Mahavira, Parswanatha and Padmavathi Devi. The idol of Bagavathi was installed instead of Padmavathi Devi by Sri Moolam Thirunal, king of Travancore in 1913. Above the hanging path, there is a dilapidated tower on a rock on the northern side. Bas-relief sculptures of all the 24 Tirthankaras are found. Some inscriptions belonging to the 9th century are also found here. It was a Jain training centre for both males and females in those days.
