= Meenachal Sri Krishna Swamy Temple =

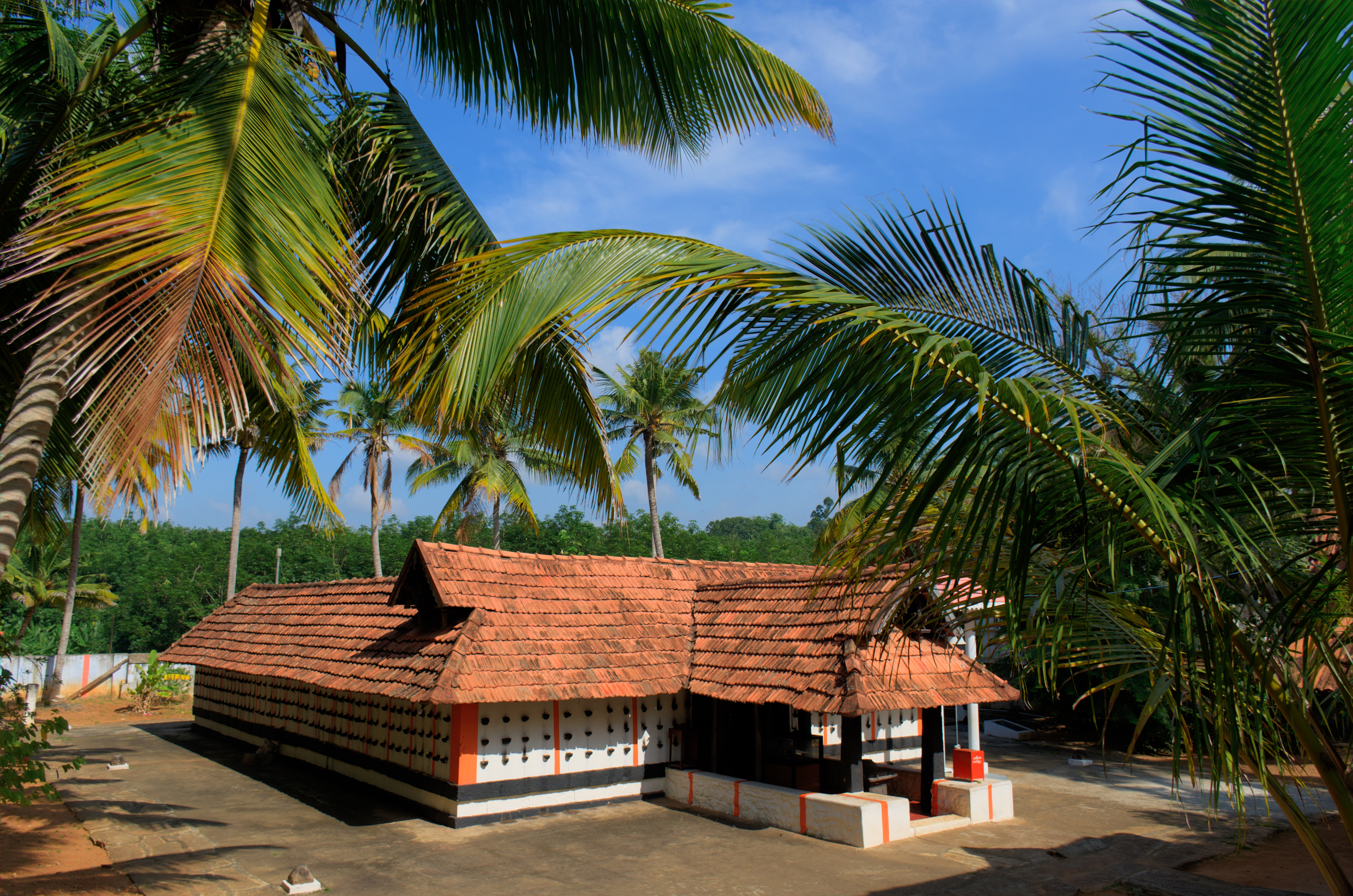
- Three-Quarter view of the main temple

- Location within Tamil Nadu

Religion
- Affiliation: Hinduism
- District: Kanyakumari district
- Deity: Vishnu
- Festivals: Krishna Jayanthi, Rohini maholsavam.
- Governing body: Meenachal sreekrishna seva committee

Location
- Location: Meenachal
- State: Tamil Nadu
- Country: India
- Coordinates: 8°19′50.1816″N 77°11′2.8979″E

Architecture
- Type: Kerala Style
- Completed: unknown, believed to be built around 1160 AD

Meenachal Sree Krishna Swamy temple (Tamil - மீனச்சல் ஸ்ரீ கிருஷ்ணசுவாமி கோயில், Malayalam - മീനച്ചൽ ശ്രീ കൃഷ്‌ണസ്വാമി ക്ഷേത്രം) is a Hindu temple situated in Meenachal village of Kanyakumari district, Tamil Nadu, India. Located near the border with Kerala, it is one of the few temples in Tamil Nadu exhibiting Kerala architectural style. The temple is believed to be 1200 years old. The main deity is Vishnu, worshipped in the form of Krishna.

Major festivals observed at the temple include Krishna Janmashtami and Ashtami Rohini.

== Gallery ==
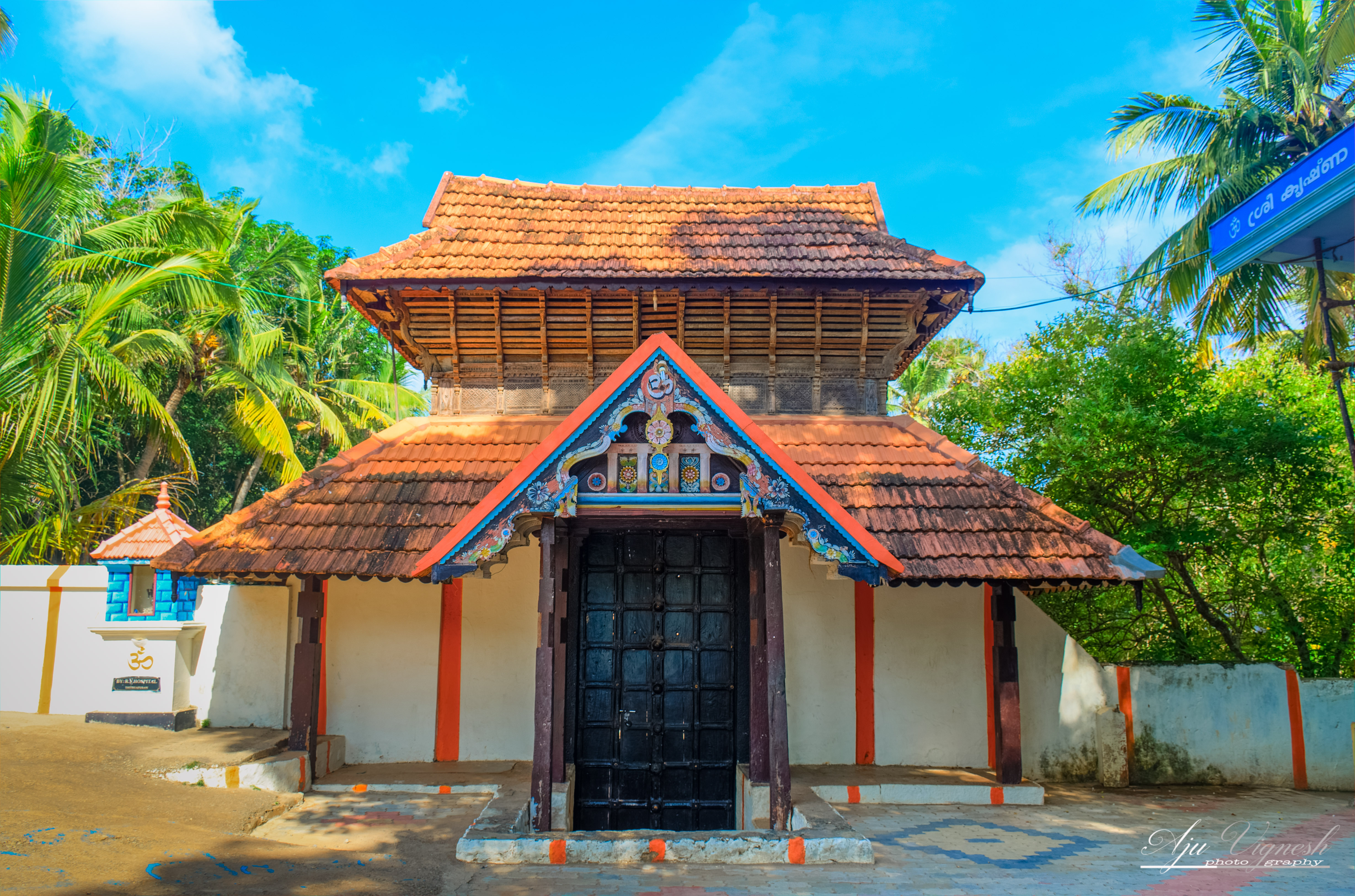
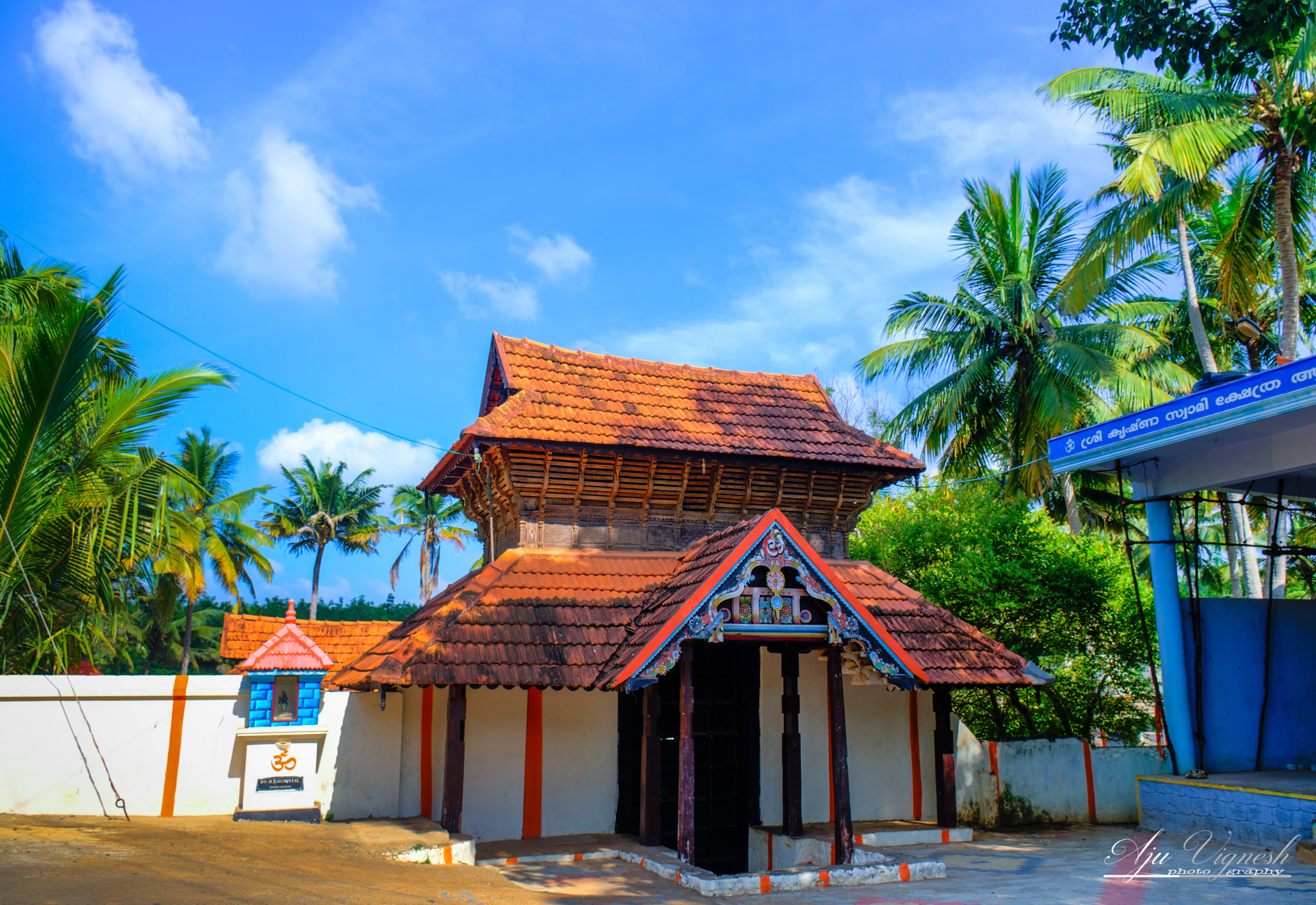
