= Chinny Krishna =

Indian industrialist, activist, and chemical engineer

S. Chinny Krishna
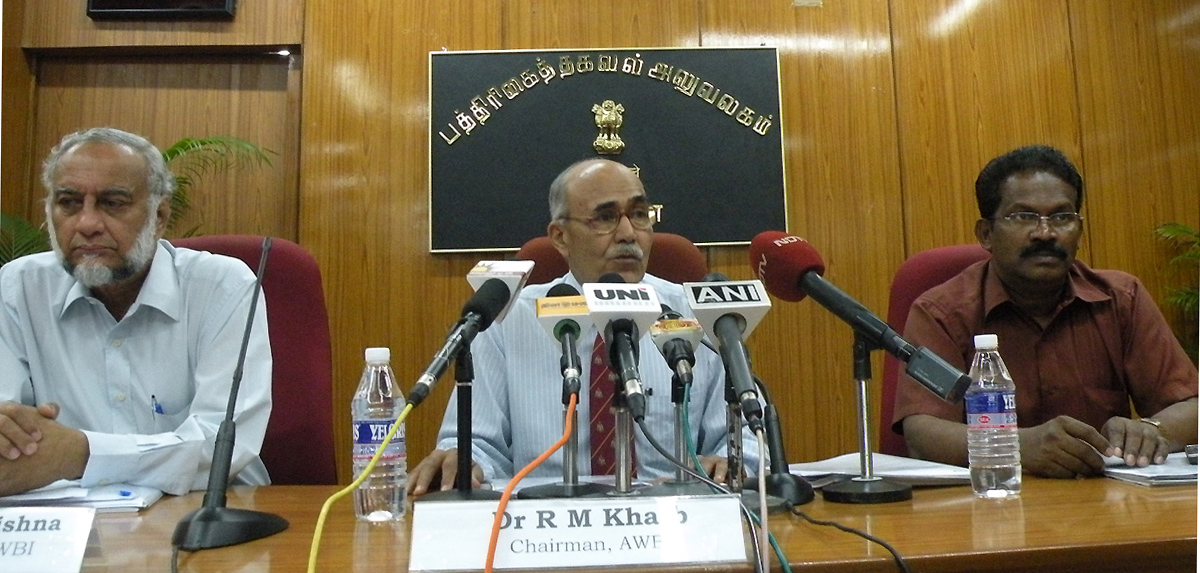
- Chinny Krishna (left) and R.M. Kharb addressing the media, in Chennai on January 10, 2011.
- Born: 1945
- Education: B. Tech and M. Tech in Chemical Engineering, University of Madras M.S. in Business Administration, Bucknell University
- Known for: Animal welfare advocacy
- Parent: V. Sundaram Usha Sundaram

S. Chinny Krishna is an Indian animal welfare activist, entrepreneur, and co-founder of Blue Cross of India. He is known for introducing the Animal Birth Control-Anti-Rabies (ABC-AR) programme. Born to V. Sundaram and Usha Sundaram, the country's first woman pilot, Chinny had a deep love and compassion for animals.

Chinny pursued Chemical Engineering and Business Administration. He founded Aspick Engineering Pvt Ltd in 1974, where he led projects in radio telescopes and robotic satellite arms, contributing to the Satellite Instructional Television Experiment.

== Personal life ==
Chinny is the youngest son of V. Sundaram and Usha Sundaram, the first woman pilot in the country. In 1974, he had a traditional marriage with Nanditha Krishna, an author and an environmentalist. Chinny's love for animals began in his childhood home, a refuge for rescued dogs, cats, birds, and donkeys, carried on by Usha Sundaram's parent's profound love for animals. He was an avid tennis player and has been mostly vegan since 1964, avoiding leather, silk, and most animal products.

== Early life and career ==
After finishing school at St Joseph's Boys' High School, Bangalore, Chinny pursued an MTech in Chemical Engineering from the University of Madras in Chennai. He then pursued an MS in Business Administration from Bucknell University, and joined the American Cyanamid in New York. Upon returning to India, Chinny established Aspick Engineering Pvt Ltd in 1974. He used the proceeds from selling a motorcycle to fund the company, which focused on building radio telescopes and robotic satellite arms for the Department of Space. In 1975, Aspick Engineering manufactured 10-meter diameter dish antennae, contributing to the Satellite Instructional Television Experiment (SITE) project. This project, hailed by Arthur C. Clarke as "the greatest communications experiment in history", aimed to bring television to rural areas. The dish antennas were designed for a 15-year lifespan, but they are still in use 45 years later.

== Animal welfare ==
In 1964, Chinny started researching ways to stop the mass culling of street dogs. In 1982, the World Health Organization (WHO) released guidelines on dog population management, known as ABC (Animal Birth Control) program. M Abul Hassan, then Commissioner of Madras Corporation, visited the dog pound on 22 September 1996, as per the request of Chinny and found a mound of electrocuted pups which made him give spot orders to stop the practice of electrocution of street dogs. Over time, ABC gained acceptance across India, leading to its adoption as a law by the Animal Welfare Board of India in 2001. This legislation made it officially illegal to kill dogs in the country.

He was a teaching faculty at IIT-Madras from 1973 to 1974. In 1974, he pioneered the concept of a vegan tennis racquet, as he wanted to eliminate the use of leather grips. Chinny used high-quality nylon for the strings and aluminum for the frame, and reached out to Bohr Industries for vinyl rexine, a suitable alternative that provided grip and absorbed sweat. However, due to low demand and high production costs, he was compelled to halt racquet production the same year.

Chinny established free animal hospitals, shelters, and dispensaries across Chennai, Tiruvellore, and Kanchipuram districts and round-the-clock ambulance services for animals in Chennai and Kanchipuram, as well as shelters for abandoned cattle. He also developed "Compufrog", an interactive computer software as an alternative to animal dissection in schools. This initiative led to the eventual ban on animal dissection in Indian schools. He further contributed by supplying thousands of copies of these programs to schools in Switzerland.

Chinny holds the position of Chairman Emeritus at Federation of Indian Animal Protection Organisations, and has held two terms as the Vice Chairman for the Animal Welfare Board of India.

In 2017, a ten member committee headed by the Cabinet secretary recommended Chinny Krishna for the Padma Shri award. According to an official, Chinny was removed from the final list because he opposed the government against the decision to lift the ban on jallikattu in the Supreme Court. He condemned the Tamil Nadu's bull-taming festival jallikattu and said it was illegally executed and was unjust to bulls. In 2018, he expressed concerns about the People who were carrying out attacks in the name of protecting cows which harmed the animal rights movement.

From 1996 to 2002, Chinny was a member and board representative of the Committee for the Purpose of Control of Scientific Experiments on Animals (CPCSEA). He is also an elected Life Fellow of both the Institution of Engineers and the Indian Institute of Chemical Engineers.

Chinny was invited to share his expertise and initiate ABC-AR programs in cities worldwide, including Bratislava, Cairo, Sofia, Orlando, Hong Kong, Manila, Singapore, Bali, and Chengdu.

== Awards and honors ==
- Jeev Daya Puraskar — Government of India (2001)
- Venu Menon National Animal Award for Lifetime Achievement (2002)
- Humane Society International Award (USA) (2005)
- North Shore Animal League Award (2005)
- Winsome Constance Kindness Award (2020)
- Prani Mitra Award (2021)
- OBA Lifetime Achievement Award — St Joseph's Boys' High School, Bangalore (2021)
