= Blue Cross of India =

Animal welfare charity based in Chennai, India

- Abbreviation: BCI
- Formation: 1959
- Founder: V. Sundaram
- Type: Animal Welfare Organization
- Headquarters: Chennai, Tamil Nadu, India
- Location: Chennai
- Coordinates: 12°59′59″N 80°12′56″E
- Official language: Tamil, English
- Affiliations: RSPCA, WSPS
- Website: bluecrossofindia.org

The Blue Cross of India (BCI) is an animal welfare charity based in Chennai, India. It was established in 1959 by V. Sundaram, his wife Usha and their three children, in Chennai (then Madras). The society was formally registered in 1964 under the Societies Registration Act. The nine signatories to the Articles and Memorandum of Association were Captain V. Sundaram, Usha Sundaram, S. Chinny Krishna, Suresh Sundaram, S. Vijayalakshmi, D. Daivasigamony, Kamakshi Krishnamoorthi, Sundari Nataraj and T. V. Chandrasekhar. It is now one of the country's largest animal welfare organisations. It runs several animal welfare programs including animal rights awareness.

Blue Cross of India (BCI) runs hospitals and shelters for injured or unwell stray dogs, cats, cattle, horses, and birds in Chennai. They also provide animal ambulances and a mobile dispensary.

The non-medical division of the organisation is looked after by volunteers. The organisation has received several national and international awards.

On July 27, 1994, thirty years after the organisation's founding, it received a gift of 4 acres (16,000 m^{2}) of land and a donation of ₹ 25,00,000. This land was purchased a few months later so that they could have a permanent shelter.

== History ==
The BCI was established in 1959 by Captain V. Sundaram and his family, who was a member of the Animal Welfare Board of India (AWBI) in the early 1960s and again in the 1980s. Initially started as a small group, it grew to become one of the country's largest animal welfare organizations, running active animal welfare, animal rights and humane education programmes. It was registered as a society under the Societies Act in 1964. The AWBI granted recognition in 1966.

In 1964, soon after its inception, BCI suggested the city's corporation, which had been catching and killing street dogs since 1860 (to control its population and control rabies deaths in humans), an alternate method of capturing street dogs, neutering them and administering anti-rabies vaccine before discharging them to their original location, which would both control the population and help reduce and eventually prevent human deaths due to rabies. However, as the corporation did not heed this advice, BCI started working on this programme on its own.

BCI began to rescue, spay and vaccinate street dogs and also persuaded pet owners and people taking care of street dogs to bring them for treatment free of cost. By the early 1970s, the number of stray dogs killed by the corporation was so high that the Central Leather Research Institute started designing products such as neckties and wallets from dog skins. By 1996, as many as 135 dogs were killed each day by the corporation, which employed various methods including administering a saturated solution of magnesium chloride directly into their hearts, poisoning, electrocuting, clubbing to death and burying alive in pits covered with bleaching powder and pesticides.

In 1995, the then Corporation Commissioner S. Abul Hassan agreed to let BCI carry out an Animal Birth Control-Anti-Rabies (ABC-AR) programme in South Madras with the rider that the Commissioner would personally monitor the process and results. In 1995, even as BCI started the ABC-AR programme in South Chennai, street dogs in other parts of the city were still caught and killed. Soon, as the ABC-AR method started yielding visible results, the corporation agreed to relinquish its catch-and-kill policy and implement ABC-AR throughout the city, starting September 1996, marking the beginning of the ABC-AR programme in India. The number of human deaths in Chennai due to rabies dropped from 120 in 1996 to zero in 2007 and in 2010 the Corporation of Chennai declared Chennai to be rabies-free. However, there were a few deaths after the Chennai Corporation limits were greatly increased a few years later owing to less rigorous implementation of the ABC-AR programme in the suburbs and not abiding by the PCA Act (1960) and the Dog Rule Act (2001).

Soon the corporations in other cities in India and around the world invited the then Chairman of the BCI, Chinny Krishna, to share the expertise in international conferences in Bratislava, Cairo, Sofia, Orlando, Hong Kong, Manila, Colombo, Riga, Amman, Singapore, Bali and Chengdu and to initiate the ABC-AR programmes in their cities. In May 2013, the government of the Republic of Mauritius, which had been using catch-and-kill as the only method to control the number of stray dogs, solicited the assistance of BCI to introduce ABC-AR programme in Mauritius. Unfortunately, the Mauritius government did not go ahead with the programme.

== Facilities ==
=== Geriatric Ward ===
In January 2019, BCI opened a geriatric ward for ageing stray dogs at a cost of ₹ 1 million. The ward, with marble flooring to guard against ticks and insects and a heat-proof roofing, is spread over 3,600 square feet, with open space, two kennels for physically challenged animals, one kennel for visually impaired dogs, and an intensive care shed and a room for storing medicines. The kennels has a capacity to accommodate 30 animals.

== Functions ==
The Blue Cross was affiliated to the RSPCA and WSPA. For the past few years, it has been working with Four Paws of Austria in disaster management and rabies control. The administration and non-medical activities of the organisation are almost entirely looked after by voluntary members in order to ensure that all monies received by the society are used primarily for animal welfare activities.

== Locations ==
The registered office is in Chennai, located at Eldams Road in Alwarpet, along with other outreach sites—such as hospitals, shelters, ambulance services and animal birth control (ABC) centers—in the city and in Pondicherry. The main hospital and shelter facilities with ABC centres are located at Guindy and Kunnam in Kanchipuram district. It also has ABC centers at Toducadu in Thiruvallur district and in Pondicherry.

== Activities ==
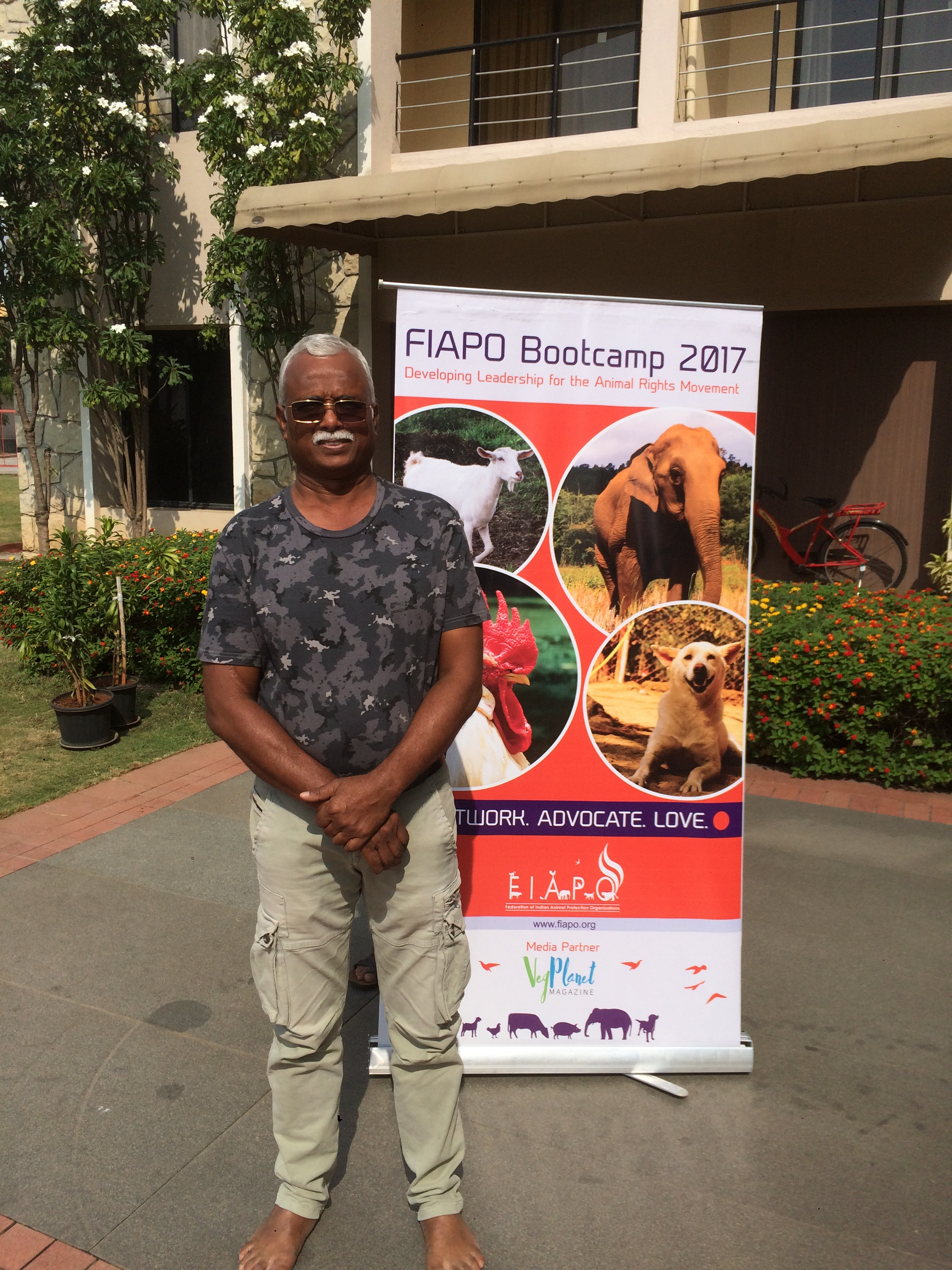
Dawn Williams, General Manager of Blue Cross of India, as faculty at FIAPO boot camp, Pune, December, 2017.

- Medical waste disposal
- Shelters
- Rehoming
- Adoption
- ABC - Animal Birth Control
- Hospitals
- Mobile Dispensary
- Work with Other NGOs
- Ambulance Services
- Other Blue Cross Org.

== Aviary clinic ==
On 13 January 2013, the Blue Cross of India, along with a student's group known as 'spaaak' opened an aviary clinic at the Chennai centre to treat ailing birds. This is the city's first aviary clinic. The clinic was started with an investment of ₹ 800,000 collected by means of donations.

== Awards ==
In 1963, the Royal Society for the Prevention of Cruelty to Animals awarded Sundaram the Queen Victoria Medal. In 1964, Sundaram was awarded the Madras SPCA's silver medal and in 1991, the Watumall Foundation of Hawaii bestowed their award for his animal welfare activities. The Mylapore Academy and many others honoured him. The Government of India conferred their Prani Mitra award on him in 1997. Dr. S. Chinny Krishna has been awarded the Jeev Daya Puraskar by the Government of India, the Venu Menon Life Time achievement award, the Elizabeth Lleyt Award of the North Shore Animal League, The Middle East Network for Animal Welfare's Lifetime Achievement Award, The Jeanne Marching Award, and many others including the Kanuna Award. The Blue Cross has received the Proggy Award from PETA for its most innovative and interactive computer programmes which serve as an alternate to dissection of animals, the Bhagavan Mahaveer Ahimsa Foundation Award; and the Hastimull Award.

== See also ==
- Animal welfare and rights in India
- Blue Cross of Hyderabad
