= 2017 pro-jallikattu protests =

Indian youth protests

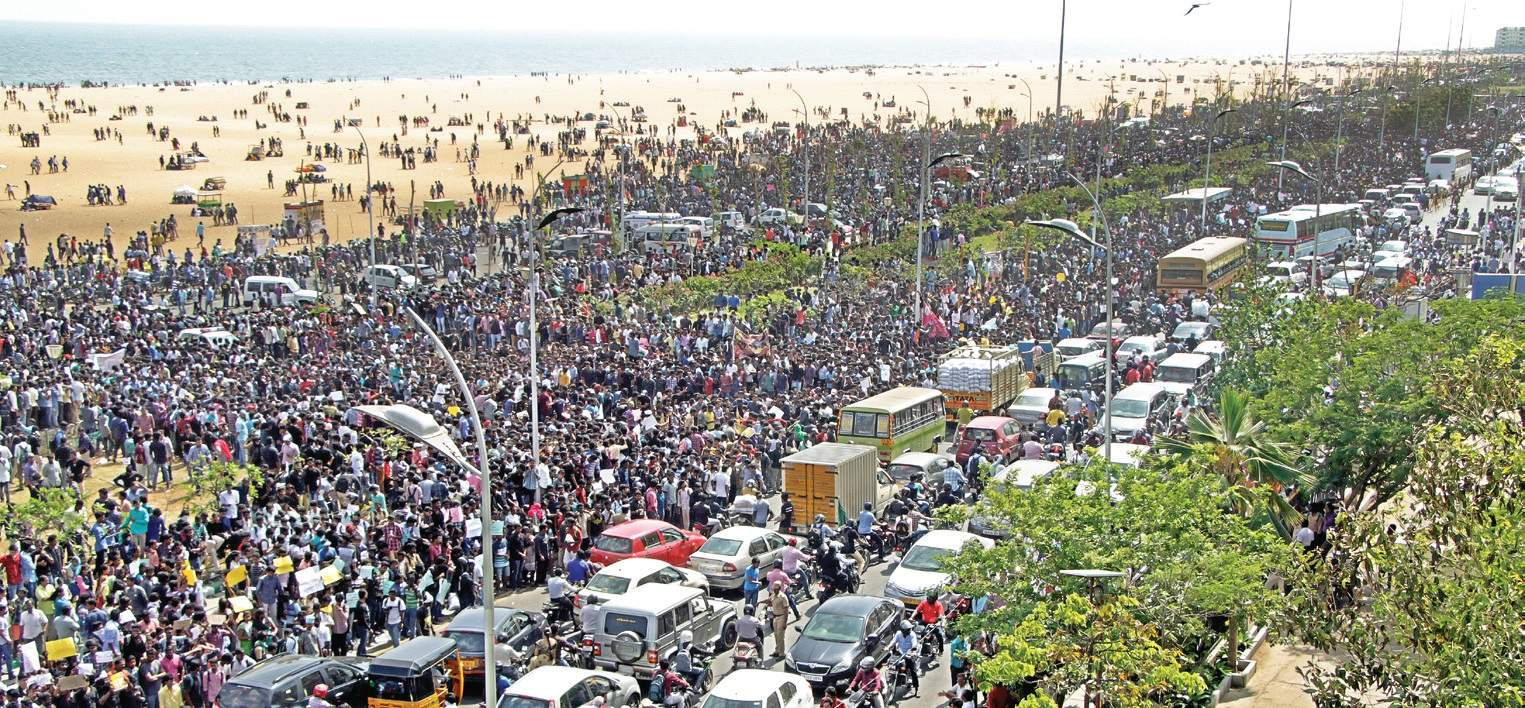
- Jallikattu protesters gathering at Chennai Marina Beach
- Date: 8 January 2017 – 23 January 2017 (15 days)
- Location: Tamil Nadu, India
- Caused by: Supreme Court's ban against jallikattu
- Goals: Revoke the ban on jallikattu; Ban PETA
- Methods: picketing, sloganeering, human chain, silent protest, hunger strike, demonstration, internet activism, candlelight vigil
- Result: Tamil Nadu state legislation passed bill legalising jallikattu

Number
> 1 million	

Casualties
- Injuries: > 60

The 2017 pro-jallikattu protests, also known as the pro-jallikattu movement, were leaderless apolitical youth protests which took place in January 2017 in large groups in several locations across the Indian state of Tamil Nadu. Some sporadic smaller protests also took place across India as well as overseas. The chief motivation of the protest was against the Supreme Court's order to ban jallikattu (occasionally also known as sallikattu, eru taluval and manju virattu), a traditional Tamil bull taming sport, which is held during Pongal, a harvest festival in the state of Tamil Nadu, India. The sport is conducted annually on the second day of the Tamil month Thai. The sport was banned by the Supreme Court in a decision citing cruelty to animals based on a lawsuit filed by the animal rights group People for the Ethical Treatment of Animals (PETA), which asserted that it violates the Prevention of Cruelty to Animals Act (PCA).

The first large protests occurred on 8 January 2017, when several groups, organised largely via social media, conducted a protest at the Marina beach in Chennai to revoke the ban on jallikattu which was imposed in 2014. These groups also demanded that PETA be banned from India. The protests soon gained momentum and spread all over Tamil Nadu. After several days of protests, jallikattu was finally legalised locally on 23 January when the Government of Tamil Nadu passed a bill to amend the PCA Act. As the legalisation is not Indian federal law, but rather state law, there is concern from Indian legal experts that jallikattu could be banned once again by the Supreme Court.

The largely peaceful nature of the protests received praise from all over the country and inspired the legalisation movements of several other Indian states' traditional outlawed celebrations. Despite violence on 23 January, this perception continued after the Tamil Nadu Police reported that the violence was caused by "anti-social elements" co-opting the protest, and not the student protesters themselves. The movement has been described as a symbol for Tamil pride and has largely been compared to the anti-Hindi agitations of Tamil Nadu and dubbed by many as 'Thai Puratchi'.

== Background ==
Jallikattu is a traditional bull taming event wherein a berserk bull is released into a crowd, and the participants of the crowd individually attempt to grab and hold on to the bull's hump for a determined distance, a determined time, or with the goal of removing a packet of money tied to the bull's horns. The sport, which is considered to be 2500–10,000 years old, is usually held during Thai Pongal across several locations in Tamil Nadu, with the primary event being held in Alanganallur. During the event, injuries or even death often occur to participants. While bull breeders contend that the participating bulls are treated well, PETA asserts its investigators found that the bulls suffers cruel treatment, from having their tails twisted, being stabbed, punched and jumped on. India's Prevention of Cruelty to Animals Act (PCAA) outlaws animal cruelty, and sets up the punishment offenders can expect to receive. The Madras High Court was the first to rule that jallikattu was not allowable under the PCAA in 2006. However, traditional sports like jallikattu have since then always been allowed through various legal and extralegal means, the most recent of which is the Tamil Nadu Regulation of Jallikattu Act No 27, passed by the Tamil Nadu Legislative Assembly and signed into law in 2009.

In January 2011, Hema Malini appealed to the Ministry of Environment and Forests (MoE) to ban Jallikatu, and it responded by issuing a notification that bulls may no longer be used as performing animals in India, adding it to a list which previously included only bears, monkeys, tigers, panthers and lions. Armed with this, in April 2011, PETA announced that it would challenge the 2009 Tamil Nadu law as unconstitutional, as it now conflicts with the Indian federal law. After three years in court, on 7 May 2014, PETA, represented by Raj Panjwani, along with the Animal Welfare Board of India (AWBI), striking down the 2009 Tamil Nadu law. In defiance of the ban, citizens of Tamil Nadu attempted to carry out the tradition on 18 January 2015, but police arrested forty six people and allowed the animals to go free.

In preparation for the 2016 jallikattu season, the Centre reversed its earlier decision and on 7 January 2016 MoE once again removed bulls from the list of banned performing animals. Justices Dipak Misra and Rohinton Fali Nariman were highly critical of this reaction, and were quoted by The Hindu as stating jointly: "How can you negate our judgment banning jallikattu by coming up with the January 2016 notification allowing bulls to participate in the sport again? [...] We cannot import Roman gladiator-type sport here." The Supreme Court issued a stay order on 12 January 2016, effectively banning the sport just five days after the Centre unbanned it. With the police on their side this time, however, jallikattu went ahead anyway, and thousands gathered to watch bull races and the main sport.

In preparation for the 2017 season, once again multiple petitions were filed to try to get the Supreme Court to reconsider; and once again they were all denied, including a petition attempting to argue a religious freedom angle. The Supreme Court once again sparred with the Centre, who was trying to get it unbanned as it was a 5,000-year-old cultural tradition of the Tamil people, but the court responded simply "In 1899, ten thousand girls below 12 years of age were married. Should we allow it today because it was a tradition at that time?" and rejected the petition. For the 2017 season, political tension was high, perhaps sparking the massive protest: people blamed the AIADMK and BJP political parties for failing to reverse the ban during the last three years. Once again, citizens flouted the Supreme Court, and jallikattu went ahead despite its legal status. With an uncooperative judiciary, the other branches of government began work on a law which would override the court's decision: on 19 January 2017, prime minister of India Narendra Modi vowed to support Tamil Nadu but declined to give further details, claiming that he could not as the case was currently sub judice. In an interview, former Supreme Court justice Markandey Katju observed that laws can be changed even when the matter is in court as was done for the act that abolished zamindari in the 1950s when the Nehru government removed the right to property as a fundamental right.

=== Support ===
Jallikattu is cited as one of the last available ways to promote and preserve the native livestock because the other uses of native breeds such as ploughing, breeding via mating and milk is on decline due to advancement in mechanization by tractors, improvement in artificial insemination and hybrid Jersey cows respectively. Native breed activists claim that Tamil Nadu had over one million Kangayam bulls in 1990 and that the population has fallen to 15,000 by the 2010s. Minor protests were initiated by cattle rights activists and farmers. Music videos, such as "Takkaru Takkaru" by Hiphop Tamizha, and on Facebook videos to talk about jallikattu and its benefits inspired the protestors. There were also claims that the indigenous cattle bulls are critically endangered in Tamil Nadu and banning jallikattu will have the adverse effect of wiping them out completely. According to pro-jallikattu activists, jallikattu is not just a sport that is deeply entrenched in Tamil culture, but it has also inadvertently served as a scientific method of breeding cattle. This view is held among a majority of jallikattu supporters. The protest is aimed at revival of the native humped bull, called the zebu. The Tamil Nadu breed of zebu is unique to India and has several advantages compared to European varieties of cattle such as the Holstein cow. The native breeds are rich in the A2 variety of beta casein protein which aides easy digestion whereas milk from European Bos taurus contain the A1 variant of the beta casein protein which is related to allergies and some serious health conditions. The Holstein breeds found their way into India as a result of Operation Flood of late 1960s through cross breeding to increase the low milk yield of native breeds. As the Jersey cow can yield nine times the quantity of milk as a zebu in the same period, there is concern among protesters that without jallikattu providing an economic incentive for the breeding of zebu, the breed will become endangered and eventually extinct. PETA disputes the allegation that outlawing jallikattu would lead to a loss of the Tamil Nadu zebu, stating that the bulls can still be used as studs regardless of whether jallikattu is legal or not.

Support from various groups, including film actors, politicians, cricketers and other sportsmen, social activists, and authors. Raghava Lawrence, actor Silambarasan, director V. Gowthaman, Seeman, Samuthirakani, Ameer, RJ Balaji, Aari, Mansoor Ali Khan and G. V. Prakash Kumar took part actively during the protests. Spiritual leaders like Sri Sri Ravi Shankar, and Sadhuguru Jaggi Vasudev also spoke in support of the sport. The protestors rejected any attempt for leadership by politicians and celebrities and wished to remain a leaderless mass movement.

On 19 January 2017, film composer A. R. Rahman announced that he will observe a day-long fast in support of the protesters, and for 'Tamil Nadu's spirit'.

=== Opposition ===
The main opposition of jallikattu comes from the Indian branch of the international non-governmental organization People for the Ethical Treatment of Animals (PETA). PETA's opposition is also shared by the Animal Welfare Board of India (AWBI), Federation of Indian Animal Protection Organisations and Compassion Unlimited Plus Action (CUPA). Judges of the Supreme Court of India have likewise criticized the Indian Central Government's support of jallikattu just because it is a tradition and have voiced their opposition of it. The Supreme Court has also held that the sport is inherently cruel in nature and this deprives the animal of its basic right to live without subject to fear and torture. The judgement also clarifies that the sport is neither religious ritual nor an essential sport for the Tamil community as the sport is played only in few districts of central Tamil Nadu and not in all districts. The sport has claimed multiple lives including those of the tamers, onlookers and the police. The first ban on jallikattu was a result of a case filed by the father of a tamer who lost his life in the event.

PETA denies that ending the jallikattu event will lead to the loss of the native bull, and has pointed out that bulls can be used as studs regardless of whether or not they are engaged in jallikattu. Furthermore, PETA claims that veterinarians can determine which bulls are healthiest with far more scientific rigor than jallikattu can.

== Timeline ==
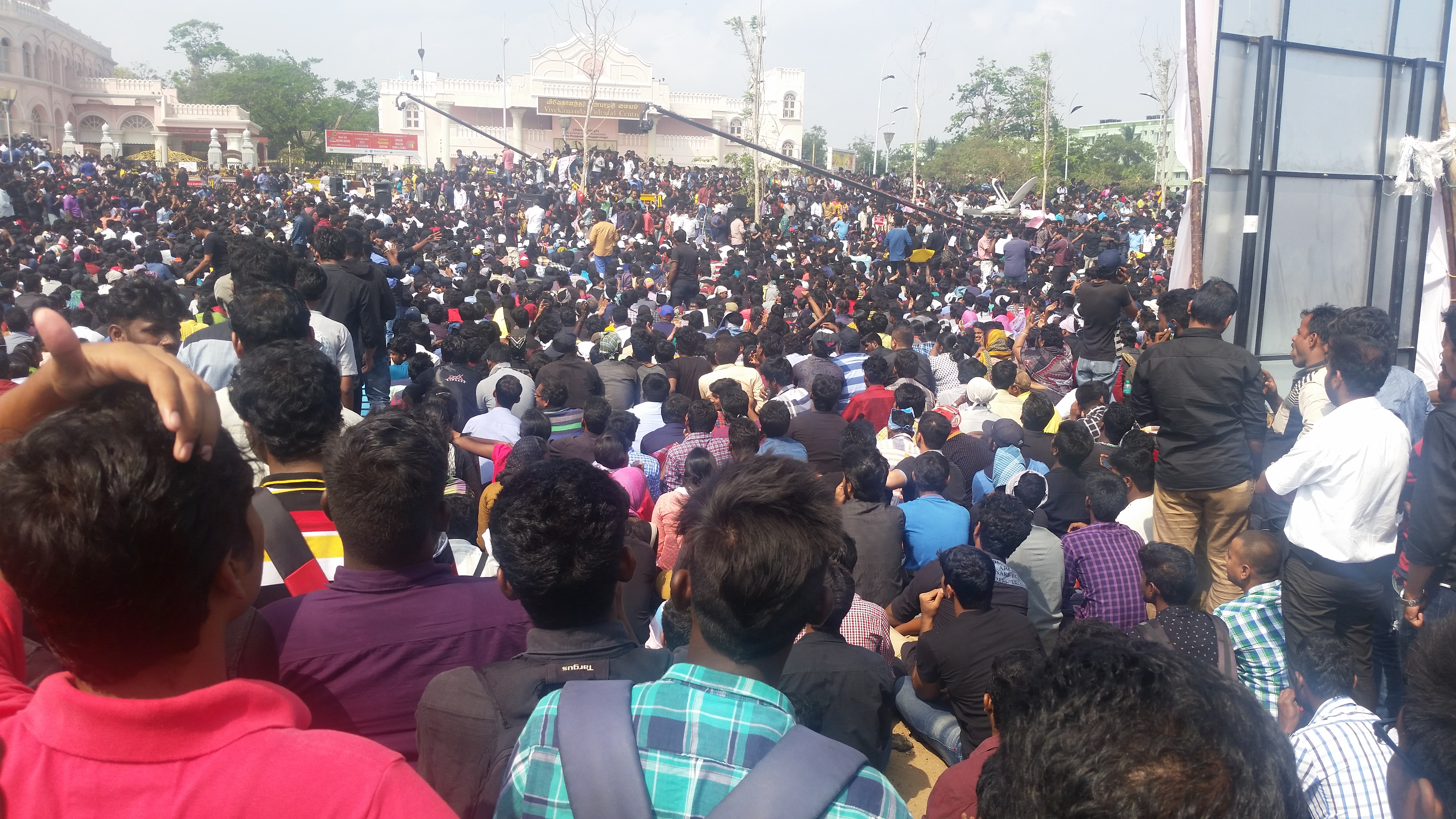
Thousands of people protesting on Marina Beach in Chennai

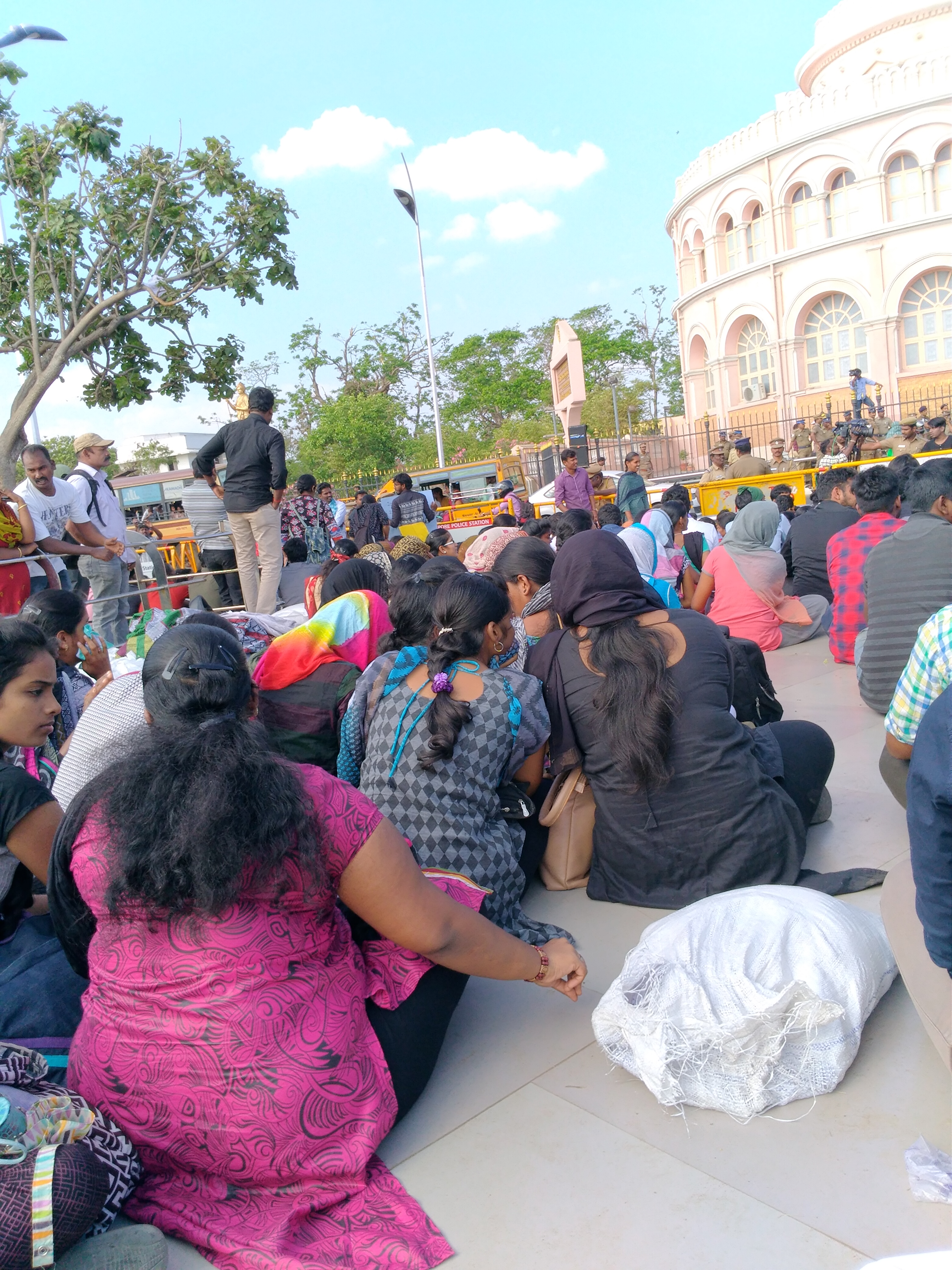
Women protesting at Vivekananda House in Chennai

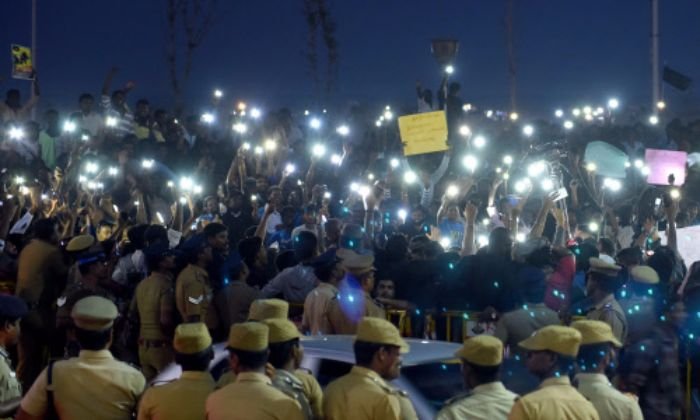
Students use their mobile phone flashlights to illuminate their protest after street lights are turned off by power company TNEB.

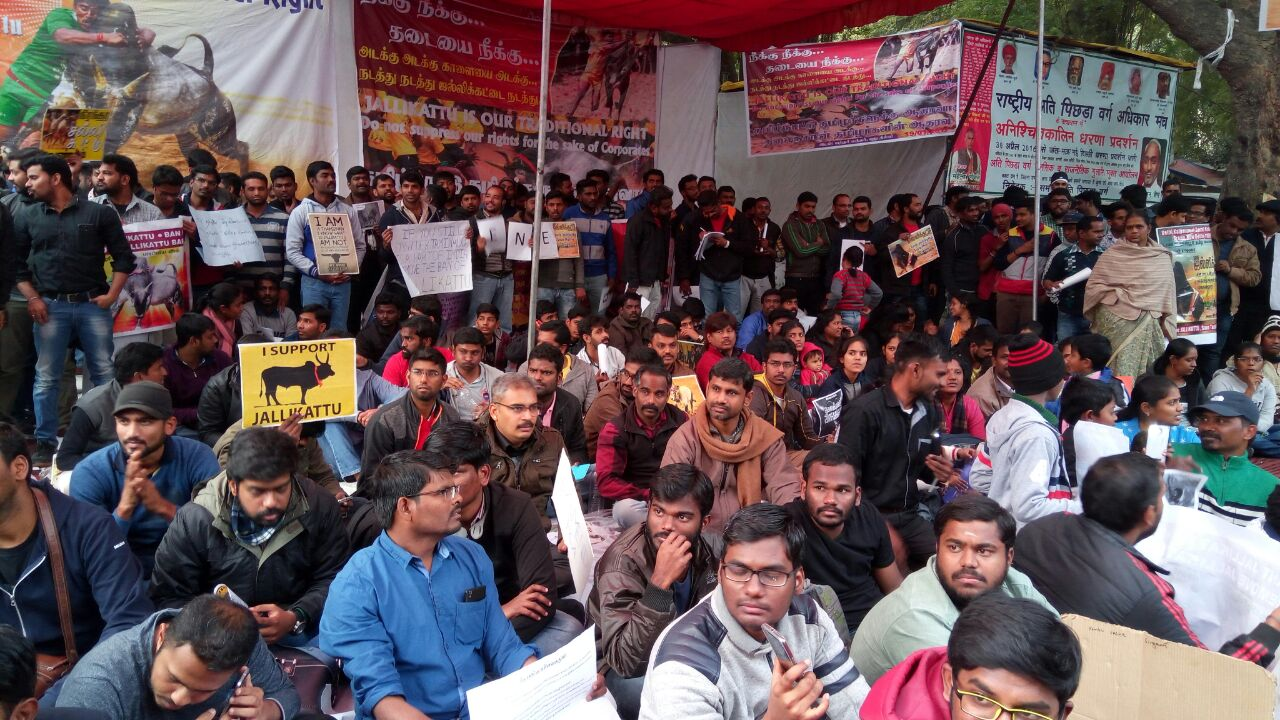
Protesters in Jantar Mantar, New Delhi

Sporadic demonstrations began on 4 January, but mass protests did not begin until two weeks later.

On 16 January 2017, villagers of Alanganallur protested at Alanganallur 'Vaadi vaasal' – The Arena, the place known for the jallikattu sport – on that date, the sport was also practiced in defiance of the ban. After a day long protest, police arrested the protesters numbering around 200 in Madurai. On 17 January 2017, In support of the arrested, Students gathered in Marina Beach. This day incidentally coincided with the birth centenary of former Tamil Nadu Chief Minister M.G.Ramachadran. The crowds started swelling for the night and few hundred spent their night in beach and the crowds continued to gather strength throughout the next day. The protest erupted around the state including Salem, Erode, Coimbatore, Nagercoil, Thiruchrapalli, Pudhuchery. On 19 January, many volunteer groups and individuals once again gathered at the Marina beach for overnight protests. deputy Tamil Nadu Chief Minister O.Paneerselvam met Indian Prime Minister Narendra Modi and pushed for an ordinance. With no sign of protests relenting the centre suggested ordinance by Tamil Nadu Government. On 20 January, The draft ordinance was approved by Home, Environmental and Cultural Ministry.

On 20 January, the chief minister of Tamil Nadu announced that a law has been drafted and sent to the Central Government, stating, "There are full chances that jallikattu will be organised within 1–2 days." The Hindustan Times reported that the Centre approved the bill without recommending any changes, and that all that remains now is for it to be signed by the President of India, Pranab Mukherjee. On this day the Marina beach Witnessed around 20 lakh protesters on peaceful Occupy Marina protest alone with lacs thronging various cities of state.. The day witnessed a virtual shutdown in the state as most organization downed their shutters expressing solidarity for the cause. The Opposition party Dravida Munnetra Kazhagam (DMK) staged Rail Roko in district headquarters of the state.

On 21 January, the protests still continue demanding a permanent solution. Some politicians of the opposition parties started fasting as a sign of protest. The State Government promulgated the ordinance and announced that it would conduct the event the next day. However the protesters refused to budge, as they believe the ordinance has very weak legal grounds and could be overturned in much the same way as the Supreme Court overturned the 2009 ordinance.

On 22 January, the government tried to conduct the sport despite the opposition from the local people in Alanganallur and other parts of Tamil Nadu who demanded a permanent resolution which can ensure jallikattu for generations to come. The protesters had successfully blocked the sport from being conducted as Government festival. However a jallikattu event was organised and held at Pudukottai without proper safety measures on a very short notice and was inaugurated by the government minister, which eventually killed two people and many were left injured.

On 23 January, with protesters refusing to budge, police began early morning forceful evictions, moving people by hand and also employing batons. Protesters at the marina threatened to venture into the sea, but eventually most protesters were removed and access to the protest site was cut off. The evictions led to further protesters and threaten to boycott the upcoming Republic Day celebrations in Chennai beach. The entire city came to standstill with protesters blocking major roads and incidents of stone pelting torching of vehicles, police stations and petrol bombs were thrown whose identity remain unknown. There have also been reports of police involving in burning of autos and vehicles. The videos of cop setting fire on vehicles and involving in arson have been going viral in social media. The initial organizers of protests called for calm and few including actors condemned the violence and the subsequent crackdown. At the end of day most of protests were either withdrawn evacuated or forcefully at all places including at Marina Beach, Madurai, Salem, Erode and Coimbatore and normalcy started to be restored.

On 24 January, according to the Times of India, the majority of student protestors in Chennai decided to call off their protest after a dialogue with police and a district court judge, viewing the Tamil Nadu ordinance and planned law as a victory, but promised to restart it if there was no permanent solution for jallikattu by 1 February.

The legal situation surrounding jallikattu is as yet not clearly resolved. While the Tamil Nadu government has claimed that its draft ordinance is a "permanent solution", many jallikattu supporters view it as merely being a "stop gap measure". As ordinances only last for six months, the Tamil Nadu Assembly plans to make the ordinance into state law "immediately". Some, however such as Ministry of External Affairs cabinet minister Salman Khurshid, have stated that the matter will only be truly resolved if the Prevention of Cruelty to Animals Act is amended as local ordinances and state laws cannot trump Indian federal law. According to The Hindu, many other Indian legal experts agreed with Khurshid's view, as federal laws such as the PCA are always more powerful than state laws, and in that respect the Prevention of Cruelty to Animals (Tamil Nadu Amendment) Act of 2017 is not much different from the 2009 one. On 24 January, in light of the new Tamil Nadu legislation, the Centre withdrew its notification allowing the sport; this means that any new legal challenges will be directed against the new legislation. For its part, PETA India has said that it will "study" the new ordinance, and has not ruled out a challenge to the new law on the same grounds as it challenged the 2009 law. On 25 January, the Animal Welfare Board of India (AWBI) restarted the legal process by formally challenging the new law before the Supreme Court, but it withdrew the petition the next day. According to the AWBI's acting chairperson, AWBI does not plan to re-file the petition, but he claimed no knowledge of what other organizations, such as PETA, may do.

On 6 July 2017, PETA India released a YouTube video showing the results of their investigation of five Jallikattu events which took place across Tamil Nadu in February 2017. According to PETA, their investigation showed abuse of the animals during the February events, including the tails of bulls being bitten and twisted, collapsed bulls being pulled by ropes attached to their noses, and bulls having their tailbones purposefully broken. In an interview with The Hindu, organisers of the events denied the claims of PETA. On 7 July 2017, PETA filed a petition with the Supreme Court of India seeking a renewed ban on Jallikattu via the invalidation of the Prevention of Cruelty to Animals (Tamil Nadu Amendment) Act of 2017 as unconstitutional.

On 2 February 2018, the Supreme Court of India accepted PETA's petition, referring the case to its constitution bench.

== Demands from the protesters ==
=== Major demands ===
- To declare an ordinance to ensure the removal of 'bulls' from the 'list of performing animals' as per the Prevention of Cruelty to Animal (PCA) Act (1960).
- To seek permanent solution for jallikattu, by passing a permanent act to conduct jallikattu every year.
- To ban People for the Ethical Treatment of Animals (PETA) in India.

=== Other demands ===
- Boycott of foreign companies such as Pepsi, Coca-Cola as their water consumption is affecting local farmers.

== Nature of protest ==
The protests were spontaneous and had no specific organizers. The protest started as Occupy Marina protest along with sit-ins at large grounds across the state. The protests were initially formed by members of Student community across the state which was further strengthened by people from various sections such as IT professionals who joined later. The lack of leader was seen as stumbling block for the state government because it could not call people for talks. The protest were largely peaceful except few Baton charge by the police.

The protests are not just confined to Chennai but thousand gathered across the state in prominent places such as Opposite to District Collectorate and Trains in Salem, MGR Circle in Trichy, Thamukam Grounds in Madurai, VOC Ground in Coimbatore, VOC Ground-Tirunelveli, VOC Ground in Erode, Vellore Fort in Vellore, Nagercoil, Thanjavur and Promenade Beach in Puducherry. Tamil youths from other states express solidarity with jallikattu protesters in Tamil Nadu. There was demonstration in Bengaluru, Mumbai, Ahmedabad, and Delhi. Support for the protest also came from Tamils around the world such as in Sri Lanka, the United Kingdom, Germany, Australia, New Zealand, Singapore, Malaysia, Canada, China, Russia, Switzerland, Ireland, Japan, the United Arab Emirates, the United States, France, South Africa, and Finland.

The protest was primarily coordinated using social media apps. The use of memes has been another feature to spread the message that adds satire and humor to the protests. Various traditional Tamil sports such as Silambattam, stilt performances and street plays are performed to showcase Tamil pride along with speeches to inspire the crowd.

Slogans were shouted against the animal rights organization PETA, alleging an international conspiracy favoring extinction of Tamil Nadu's rare cattle breed, and replacing them with Jersey cows from Denmark and Switzerland.

== Impact ==
The Marina Protest had varied impacts in different walks of life:

1. The legalization of Jallikattu by the student protest gave impetus to a similar student protest in the neighboring state, Karnataka for the support of conducting their traditional buffalo race, 'kambala' and banning of PETA, Andhra Pradesh in support of special status.
2. Traders and various colleges in Tamil Nadu have called for the ban on aerated multi-national brands like Pepsi and Coca-Cola with effect from 1 March 2017 and replace them with localised drinks like tender coconut and fresh juices.
3. Poor public turn out on the Republic day parade in Chennai, condemning the Police charge on the students.
4. Declaration of Marina as out of bounds for future protests.
