= Blue Cross of Hyderabad =

The Blue Cross of Hyderabad
- Founded: 1992
- Location: Hyderabad, Telangana, India
- Region served: Telangana
- Website: www.bluecrossofhyd.org

The Blue Cross of Hyderabad is an animal welfare Society founded in 1992 by Indian film actors Nagarjuna, Amala Akkineni and animal friendly citizens. Blue Cross of Hyderabad was later registered as a society in 1993 and is recognized by Animal Welfare Board of India.

Located in Hyderabad, Blue Cross of Hyderabad presently runs a two-acre animal shelter from where 9 projects for the welfare of animals are conducted all year round. The campus is surrounded by hills and vast open spaces housing over 650 animals of different species.

== Also learn about ==
- Blue Cross of India
- Animal welfare and rights in India
- Blue Cross
