= Nanditha Krishna =

Indian author

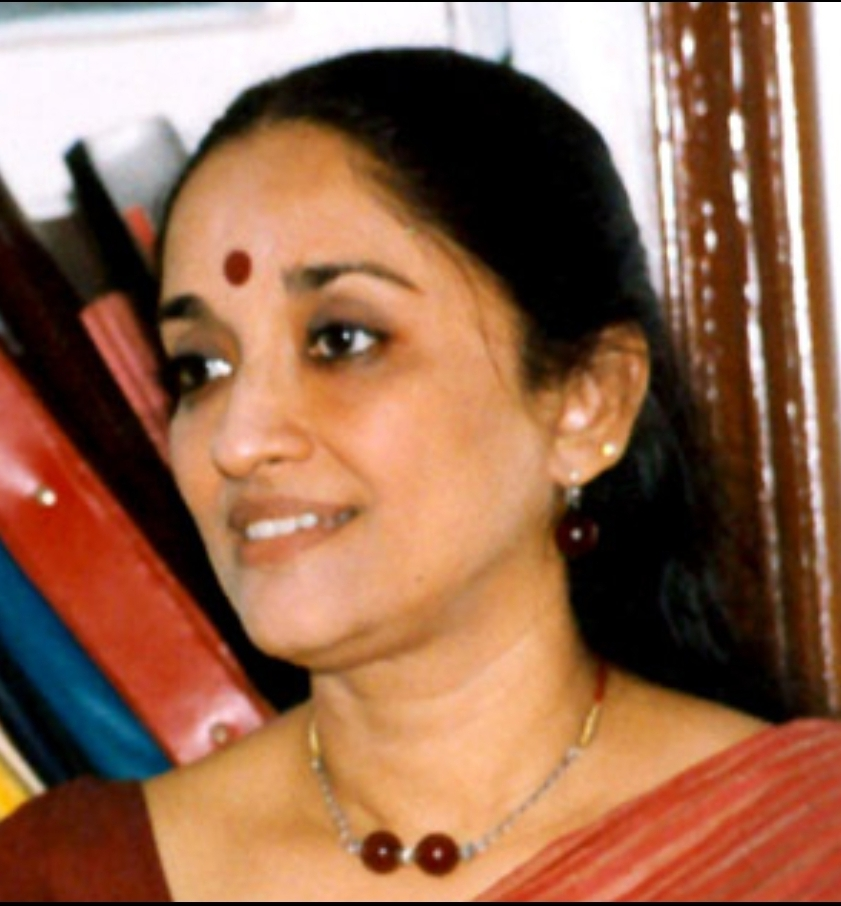
- in 2014
- Born: 1951 (age 74–75)
- Occupations: author, educationist and environmentalist
- Writing career
- Subjects: Indian art and history

Nanditha Krishna (born 1951) is an Indian author, environmentalist and educationist. She was recognised by the Government of India who gave her one of the first Nari Shakti Awards in 2015, the highest award for women in India. She is the president of the C.P. Ramaswami Aiyar Foundation in Chennai and an author of several books.

== Life ==
She was born in 1951 and was known as Nanditha Jagannathan.

She is the great granddaughter of Dr C. P. Ramaswami Aiyar, lawyer and Advocate General of Madras Presidency, Dewan of Travancore state and Vice-chancellor of Annamalai and University and Travancore University. She is the daughter of Shakunthala Jagannathan, Deputy Director-General and Regional Director of Tourism, Government of India, Mumbai, and author of the best-seller Hinduism – An Introduction and Ganesha, and A.R. Jagannathan, Vice-chairman and managing director of Tata Projects Limited. Her maternal grandfather was C. R. Pattabhiraman, former Minister of Law, Government of India.

She studied at Cathedral and John Connon High School, Bombay, graduated from Elphinstone College, Mumbai in 1970 and obtained her Ph.D. on The Iconography of Vishnu Narayana from the University of Bombay in 1975 and was a Heras scholar during the period of her research.

She received an Honorary Doctorate of Literature from Vidyasagar University, West Bengal in 2016.

== Career ==
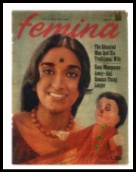
Magic Lamp TV

She was the anchor and presenter of the popular Bombay based "Magic Lamp" TV series from 1972 to 1974.

She moved to Chennai after her marriage in 1974 and founded C.P. Art Centre, Chennai's first gallery for traditional arts and crafts in 1978

In 1981 she was appointed Director of the C.P. Ramaswami Aiyar Foundation (CPRAF), and elected president in 2013. The Foundation is headquartered in Chennai, India, on Eldams Road at "The Grove", the ancestral home of the C.P. Ramaswami Aiyar family, where all the institutions mentioned below are situated

In 1981, the C.P. Ramaswami Aiyar Foundation established the C.P.R. Institute of Indological Research, affiliated to the University of Madras for the Ph.D. degree in History and Environmental Studies. She was appointed as director and later a professor of the institute

In 1983, she founded The Grove School which was affiliated to the Council for Indian School Certificate Examination in 2006

In 1985, she established Saraswathi Kendra Learning Centre for Children with autism, dyslexia, learning disabilities and problems in the CPRAF campus

In 1989, she founded C.P.R. Environmental Education Centre, established jointly by the Ministry of Environment and Forests, Govt. of India and the C.P. Ramaswami Aiyar Foundation. She has restored 53 sacred groves in South India; trained Kota and Kurumba tribes to develop their traditional skills as a source of income; revived traditional rainwater harvesting in eight tanks of Tamil Nadu; designed programmes to train teachers in environmental education; introduced Dr. Dog, a pet therapy programme for autistic and dyslexic children, in Chennai; introduced Kindness Kids, a programme to teach children about their food and the environment, in Chennai . She has been documenting the Ecological Traditions of India which are posted on the Ministry of Environment and Forest's ENVIS (Environmental Information systems) website on "Conservation of Ecological Heritage and Sacred Sites" run by CPR Environmental Education Centre.

In 2001, she converted the 450-year old family house of the C.P. Ramaswami Aiyar family into the Shakunthala Jagannathan Museum of Folk Art and Rangammal Vidyalaya, a school for low-income children.

In 2005, she took over the Sir C.P. Ramaswami Aiyar Memorial School in Kumbakonam which is run as a free English medium school by the CPRAF.

She is also the president of the Conjeevarum Hindu Education Society which runs the SSKV schools and college.

She is a former Member of the Indian Council of Historical Research (2015-2018) and co-opted Member of the Monitoring/Advisory Committees for Southern Regional Centre (SRC) of the Indian Council of Historical Research, Bengaluru.

== Research ==
Her areas of research include Indian Art History and Environmental History of India. She has written several research papers, articles and books on the subject.

== Literary career ==
She started writing for Eve's Weekly and the Illustrated Weekly of India from 1972. After moving to Chennai in 1974, she wrote for The Hindu and the Illustrated Weekly of India. Her article on "Slaughter for Science" in the Illustrated Weekly of India, 26 March 1978, resulted in a total ban on the export of Rhesus monkeys from India.

She had a regular column "Creations" in The Sunday Express from 2001 to 2007.

Since 2017, she has been writing regularly for OPEN magazine and now has a column in editorial page of The New Indian Express.

== Books ==
- Believe in Yourself – Life Lessons from Swami Vivekananda (Aleph), 2020 – ISBN 978-93-89836-10-3
- Groves and Gods of Tamil Nadu, (ICHR, Bangalore), 2019
- Live and Let Others Live - Life Lessons from Mahavira (Aleph), 2019 - ISBN 978-93-88292-42-9
- You are the Supreme Light - Life Lessons from Adi Sankara (Aleph), 2018 - ISBN 978-93-87561-38-0
- The Book of Avatars and Divinities (Penguin, India), 2018 - ISBN 978-0-143-44688-0
- Hinduism and Nature (Penguin, India), 2017 - ISBN 0143427830
- Deva Pratima (CPR Publications), 2016 - ISBN 978-93-85459-01-6
- Sacred Groves of India – A Compendium (CPR Publications), 2014 – ISBN 978-81-86901-24-3
- Paintings of the Varadaraja Perumal Temple, Kanchipuram, (CPR Publications), 2014 - ISBN 978-81-908305-0-8
- Sacred Plants of India (Penguin, India), 2014 - ISBN 9780143066262
- Madras Then, Chennai Now (Roli Books), 2013 - ISBN 978-81-7436-914-7
- Sacred Animals of India (Penguin India), 2010 - ISBN 9780143066194
- Hug a Tree (New Horizon Media), 2010 - ISBN 978-81-8493-437-3
- Madras-Chennai, Its History and Environment (New Horizon Media) 2009 - ISBN 978-81-8493-229-4
- Book of Demons (Penguin India), 2007 - ISBN 9780143102021
- Folk Arts of Tamil Nadu (CPR Publications), 2006 - ISBN 81-901484-7-8
- Folk Toys of South India (CPR Publications), 2006 – ISBN 81-901484-9-4
- Book of Vishnu (Penguin India), 2001 - ISBN 9780670049073
- Varahishwarar Temple, Damal (CPR Publications), 2001 – ISBN 978-81-908305-5-3
- Balaji-Venkateshwara (Vakils), 2000 - ISBN 81-87111-46-1
- Painted Manuscripts of the Sarasvati Mahal Library, Thanjavur (The Maharaja Serfoji Sarasvati Mahal Library), 1994
- Arts and Crafts of Tamil Nadu (Mapin), 1992 - ISBN 0-944142-21-4
- Ganesha (Vakils), 1992 - ISBN 978-81-8462-004-7

Art and Iconography of Vishnu-Narayana, Bombay (D.B. Taraporevala), 1980

== Edited ==
- Religion and Ecology, 2019 - ISBN 978-81-86901-32-8
- The Environment and Indian History, 2016 - ISBN 978-93-85459-02-3
- Iconography of the Hindus, Buddhists and Jains, 2016 – ISBN 978-93-85459-03-0
- The Twentieth Century – A History, 2003 – ISBN 81-901484-0-0
- Kanchi, 1992 - ISBN 81-901484-1-9
- Shakti, 1991
- Ecological Traditions of India – a series covering each Indian state20

For children

- Mahabalipuram – The Ganga Comes to Tamil Nadu (Mapin Publishing), 2018 - ISBN 978-93-85360-49-7
- Animals – It's their world too (CPR Publications), 1990 - ISBN 81-86901-07-8
- The Tree (CPR Publications), 1989 - ISBN 81-86901-08-6

== Awards ==
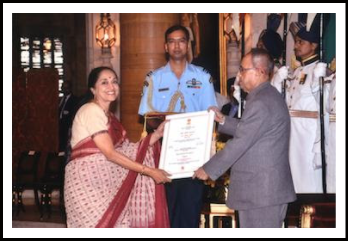
President Award

She was awarded one of the first Nari Shakti Awards for her leadership and achievement in 2015. The award was made on International Women's Day from the then Indian President Pranab Mukherjee.

Her other awards include Ambassador for Peace Award (2017); International Social Activist Award (2017) Sir J. C. Bose Memorial Award (2014); Dr. M. S. Swaminathan Award for Environmental Protection (2004); Stree Ratna (1998); and Outstanding Woman of Asia (1997). CPR Environmental Education centre received the Indira Gandhi Paryavaran Puraskar (1996) under her directorship.

She has organized several national and international seminars and conferences on Indian culture and the environment.

== Personal life ==
She is married to S. Chinny Krishna, an industrialist who is a co-founder and chairman of the animal rights charity Blue Cross of India. She is also a member of the Board of Governors of the Blue Cross of India. She has two sons – Dr. Prashanth Krishna, who is the executive director of The C.P. Ramaswami Aiyar Foundation,10 and Rudra Krishna, who is a writer and author of Onus of Karma and Brahma Towers
