= V. Sundaram =

Indian activist and aviator (1916–1997)

V. Sundaram (April 22, 1916 – May 31, 1997) was an Indian pilot and animal welfare activist. He founded the Blue Cross of India, the largest animal welfare organization of Asia.

== Career as a pilot ==
Captain V. Sundaram became a pilot in 1935 at the age of 19. He trained in England and returned to India to become an instructor at the Madras Flying Club. He flew extensively over the country, and was probably the first person to take a picture of the Taj Mahal from air. During World War II, he trained British and American pilots. In 1945 he joined Tata Airlines, and from 1945 to 1951, served as the pilot of the Maharaja of Mysore. During this time he flew Pandit Jawaharlal Nehru and Sardar Vallabhbhai Patel throughout India, especially the latter when he was negotiating the merger of princely states with India. His wife, Usha Sundaram, served as co-pilot in many of these flights. They set a world record for flying a de Havilland Dove from London to Madras in 27 hours. This record for a piston-engined aircraft is still unbroken. Captain Sundaram had an accident-free flying record during the 35 years he served as pilot. He wrote of his experiences as a pilot in a book titled An Airman's Saga.

Sundaram was the first pilot to get the commercial pilot licence in the country. On 26 October 1936, he flew a De Havilland Dove aircraft from Karachi to Madras.

== Animal welfare ==
Captain V. Sundaram was always known for his compassion for animals. It was known among pilots that he would keep circling around until the runway was cleared of stray animals. He was instrumental in stopping animal sacrifices at several places. He also organized several seminars speaking against cruel methods of killing animals. He was a member of the executive committee of the Animal Welfare Board of India until 1987.

== Blue Cross of India ==
On a rainy day in 1959, Captain Sundaram saw two pups struggling to stay afloat in the flooded roads of T. Nagar, Chennai. He took them home and founded the Blue Cross of India, a shelter for animals. In his own words, "God had given me so much that I thought I ought to do something in return. There are so many charitable institutions for human beings, but so few for animals." Blue Cross, started with a kennel in his own home, grew under his leadership to become the largest animal welfare organization of Asia.

== Awards and recognition ==
- Queen Victoria Medal from the Royal Society for Prevention of Cruelty to Animals, 1964
- Watamull Foundation Award, 1987
- Silver medal from Madras SPCA
- Silver medal from the Mylapore Academy
- Distinguished Service Award from the Rotary club of South Madras
- Prani Mitra Award, posthumously

== Bibliography ==
- An Airman's Saga. Bharatiya Vidya Bhawan. ISBN 81-7276-102-3
