= Stray animals at Indian airports =

"Jackals, neelgais, monitor lizards, peacocks, porcupines, snakes, monkeys, foxes, dogs and birds of prey - the diversity of wildlife at Indira Gandhi International Airport (IGIA) can give any small town zoo a run for its money."

— an article titled "International airport or animal world?" dated 17 June 2008 published in the Hindustan Times.

Stray animals appear to be not uncommon on the runways of Indian airports. They can pose a major threat to air safety in most airports across the nation. According to the Airports Authority of India (AAI) officials, animals straying onto the runway can happen at many airports in India.

Animals found in the runways of Indian airports include dogs, antelope, cows, jackals, snakes, cats, and monkeys.

== Incidents ==
=== Ahmedabad ===
In January 2018, a stray cow on the runway had caused chaos at Ahmedabad airport leading to two planes aborting their landings. The cow crept past security at a cargo gate at the Sardar Vallabhbhai Patel International Airport in Ahmedabad resulting in a cargo plane being diverted to Mumbai and delaying five domestic flights and several departures. It took over 90 minutes for the security personnel to clear the runway.

=== Bangalore ===
Stray dogs are a significant threat to air safety at the HAL Bangalore International Airport. On 27 March 2008, a Kingfisher Airlines aircraft hit a stray dog on the runway at the airport, resulting in the aircraft's landing gear collapsing. The aircraft skidded off the runway and its nose collapsed, and four passengers were injured.

=== Chennai ===
Stray dogs roam freely inside the Chennai International Airport.

=== Delhi ===
Hyenas and jackals have strayed on the runways of the Indira Gandhi International Airport in New Delhi resulting in their closure. In another incident in June 2008, some monitor lizards, jackals and birds of prey strayed on the secondary runway of the airport causing the airport to be closed for one hour and disrupting the schedules of nearly a hundred flights.

In 2008, a total of 571 animals, including jackals, snakes, and monkeys, were captured at this airport. From 1 October to 31 December 2009, 200 stray dogs were captured on or near the runways of the Indira Gandhi International Airport.

=== Kanpur ===
In 2008, an Air India aircraft narrowly escaped accident when it hit a nilgai during landing at Kanpur Airport in Uttar Pradesh.

=== Mumbai ===
In March 2010, a runway at Chhatrapati Shivaji International Airport in Mumbai was shut for 20 minutes after a stray dog was spotted. In a similar incident at the same airport in January 2016, one domestic flight was forced to abort take-off while four others were made to hover in the skies for more than 15 minutes after a dog strayed onto the runway.

=== Nagpur ===
Wild animals like nilgais, spotted deer, and wild boars are found at the Dr. Babasaheb Ambedkar International Airport in Nagpur. In 2008, a bench at the Nagpur High Court noted that stray animals pose a threat to air safety at the airport, which witnessed a series of incidents where wild animals strayed on the runway. In June 2011, an Air India aircraft crushed a deer on the runway of Nagpur airport as it was taking off for Delhi. Cameras also captured langurs perched on the airport's ATC signal tower as well as on the runways. In July 2009, a Kingfisher Airlines aircraft hit a stray pig on the runway of Dr. Babasaheb Ambedkar International Airport.

=== Pune ===
In 2005, an aircraft taking off from Pune International Airport ran over a stray dog, which resulted in a two-hour delay for flights.

== See also ==
- Animal welfare and rights in India
