= The C. P. Ramaswami Aiyar Foundation =

Non Profit Organization

C. P. Ramaswami Aiyar Foundation
- Formation: 14 October 1966
- Founder: C. P. Ramaswami Iyer
- Type: Non-profit organization
- Headquarters: 1, Eldam's Road, Alwarpet, Chennai, India
- Location: Chennai, Tamil Nadu, India
- Region served: India
- Fields: Education, Culture, Social Work
- President: Nanditha Krishna

The C. P. Ramaswami Aiyar Foundation is a non-profit organization founded on 14 October 1966 as per the will of lawyer C. P. Ramaswami Iyer. The foundation is headquartered a1 1, Eldam's Road, Alwarpet in Chennai, India (also known as C. P. Ramaswami Road) on the property known as "The Grove" which belongs to the C. P. Ramaswami Iyer family. The President of the foundation (in 2015) was Nanditha Krishna, a member of the family.

== Activities ==
The foundation runs several institutions that contribute to society in the fields of education, culture and social work. These include:

1. The C. P. Ramaswami Aiyar Institute of Indological Studies. Affiliated to Madras University, this institute is a recognized center for earning a Ph.D. in Indological studies
2. The C. P. Ramaswami Aiyar Environmental Education Centre, a Centre of Excellence of the Ministry of Environment, Forests and Climate Change, Govt. of India.
3. The Saraswathi Kendra Learning Centre for Children, a learning centre for children with disabilities in Chennai
4. The Shakunthala Jagannathan Museum of Folk Art in Kanchipuram
5. The C. P. Ramaswami Aiyar art centre
6. The Grove School in Chennai
7. The Rangammal Vidyalaya school for Girls in Kanchipuram
8. The Sir C. P. Ramaswami Aiyar Memorial School in Kumbakonam.

== Presidents ==
- Sir Arcot Lakshmanaswami Mudaliar (1966-1974)
- S. Chitra Narayanaswami (1974-1990)
- M. V. Arunachalam (1990-1996)
- S. Viswanathan (1996-2001)
- A. R. Jagannathan (2001-2005)
- Sarojini Varadappan (2005-2013)
- Nanditha Krishna (2013-present)
