= Usha Sundaram =

Indian pilot (1924–2010)

- Sundaram (center) with Maharajah of Mysore's Dakota DC-3 VT-AXX (1949)
- Born: 1923 or 1924
- Died: 6 April 2010 (aged 86); Chennai, India
- Occupations: Pilot; animal welfare activist
- Spouse: V. Sundaram (m. 1941; died 1997)
- Children: 3

Usha Sundaram (1923 or 1924 – 6 April 2010) was an Indian pilot and animal rights activist. She was the first female pilot of post-independence India.

== Early life ==
Sundaram was born Usha Krishnamurthi/Krishnamoorthy in 1923 or 1924 (Note: Sundaram's date of birth is not known. Estimated year of birth is computed based on her age, 86, at death in 2010. According to her son Chinny Krishna, her exact date of birth is 20th July 1924) to Kamakshi and T. S. Krishnamurthi. She married her husband, V. Sundaram, a commercial pilot and an aviation instructor at the Madras Flying Club, in July 1941. The couple moved to Bangalore in southern India in 1946 and lived in a small bungalow on the city's St. Mark's Road, before returning to Madras (present day Chennai) in the late 1950s. The couple had three children – two sons and a daughter.

== Flying career ==
Sundaram started her flying career after she and her husband's move to Bangalore, when her husband became Director of Civil Aviation in the Government of Mysore under Jayachamarajendra Wadiyar. He was later the principal of the Government Flight Training School, in Jakkur, which Wadiyar had founded in 1948. Sundaram was the school's first graduate in 1949. She was independent India's first woman pilot.

Sundaram started as a co-pilot to her husband, flying many leaders of the newly-independent India including Jawaharlal Nehru, Vallabhbhai Patel, and Rajendra Prasad. When her husband took up administrative duties with the then Tata Airlines, Sundaram continued as Nehru's pilot. Some of the planes she flew included the civilian twin-engine DC-3 Dakota. Some of her notable flights included rescue missions from the then newly-formed Pakistan during the partition riots of 1947, which she flew with her husband. She also flew the then home minister of India Vallabhbhai Patel on the Maharaja of Mysore's Dakota aircraft, when Patel was traveling on his missions toward reunification of the princely states with India.

Along with her husband, she set a speed record for piloting a piston-engine aircraft between England and India in 27 hours. The couple had been recruited by the Government of Madras to fly a newly purchased De Havilland Dove from England to India. In 1951, the couple went by ship to England and returned flying the piston-engined plane in a journey lasting 27 hours with stops in Paris, Baghdad, Karachi, and Bombay, before reaching Madras. This record still stands, as of 2020. The couple continued to fly recreationally until 1996.

== Personal life ==
Sundaram co-founded the Blue Cross of India, a Chennai-based animal welfare organization, in 1959. The foundation started at the couple's house and was later incorporated in 1964. Sundaram died on 6 April 2010, in Chennai. She was aged 86. Her husband had predeceased her in 1997.
