= Stray cattle in India =

Cattle not claimed or tended by an owner

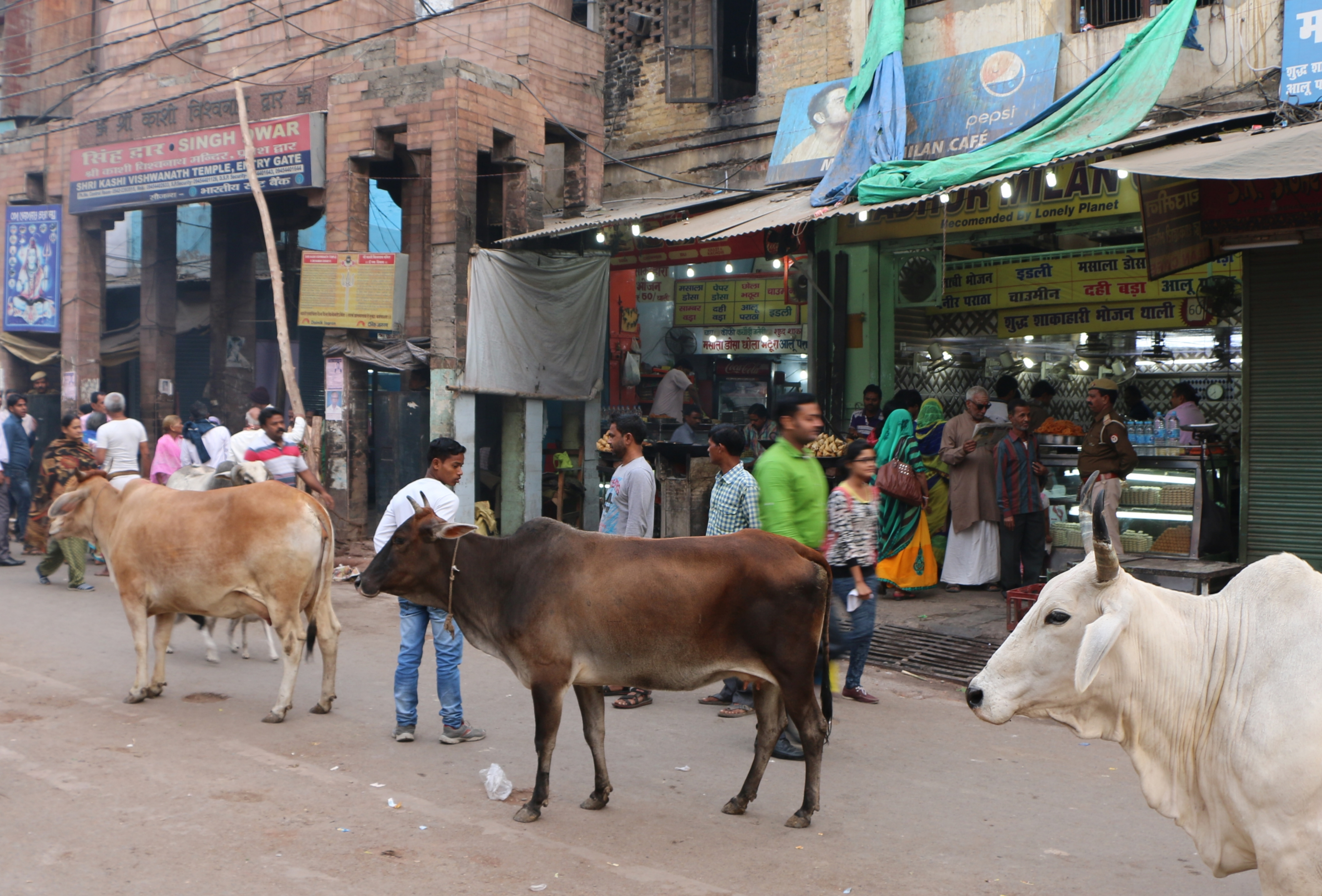
Stray cow loitering on the road in Varanasi, India

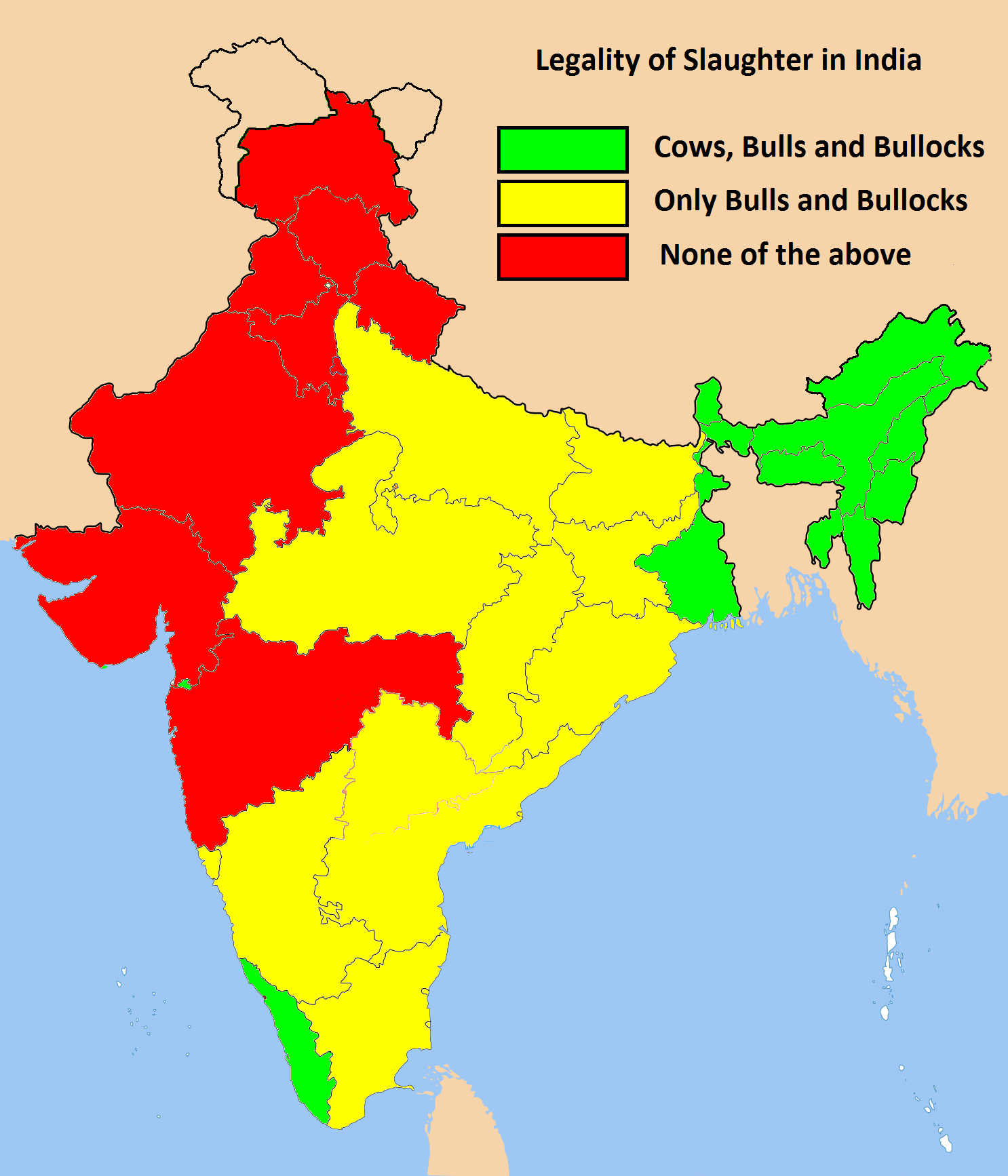
Cow slaughter laws in various states of India Cows, bulls and bullocks are allowed to be slaughtered Bulls and bullocks are allowed to be slaughtered No cattle are allowed to be slaughtered

India has over 5 million stray cattle according to the livestock census data released in January 2020. The stray cow attacks on humans and crops in both urban and rural areas is an issue for the residents.

Cow slaughter is banned in many places in India with penalties of long imprisonment and huge fines. Fear of arrest, persecution, and lynching by cow vigilantes has reduced the trading of cows. Once a cow stops giving milk, feeding and maintenance of the cow becomes a financial burden on the farmer who cannot afford their upkeep. Cattle that farmers are unable to sell are eventually abandoned. Stray cattle are defined by India's Ministry of Agriculture as cattle that do not have any owner and have strayed across the road or other public places, or that usually move or wander without any proper destination or having no shelter.

Stray cattle are a nuisance to traffic in urban areas and cause road accidents. The problem of solid waste pollution, especially plastic pollution and garbage dumped at public places, poses a risk to stray cattle which feed on garbage.

== Causes ==
Slaughtering cows is illegal in most of India, because cows are considered holy in Hinduism. Growing mechanization in the farming industry has also put cattle out of use as working animals, and increased the number of cattle abandonment cases. (Note: These cattle were previously employed in transportation using bullock carts and tilling fields.) Fear of arrest, persecution, and lynching by cow vigilantes has also reduced the trading of cattle. Once a cow stops giving milk, feeding and maintenance of the cow becomes a financial burden on the farmer who cannot afford their upkeep. Cattle that farmers are unable to sell are eventually abandoned to wander.

== Impact ==
Stray cattle pose a number of threats to human residents and animal welfare in both urban and rural areas. Stray cattle have been known to feed on standing crops and attack humans.

=== Airports ===
Stray animals used to be common on the runways of Indian airports. These stray animals pose a major threat to air safety in most airports across the nation.

In 2018, a stray cow on a runway caused chaos at Ahmedabad airport leading to two planes aborting their landings. The cow crept past security at a cargo gate at the Sardar Vallabhbhai Patel International Airport, in Ahmedabad, resulting in a cargo plane being diverted to Mumbai and delaying five domestic flights and several departures. It took over 90 minutes for the security personnel to clear the runway.

=== Railway ===
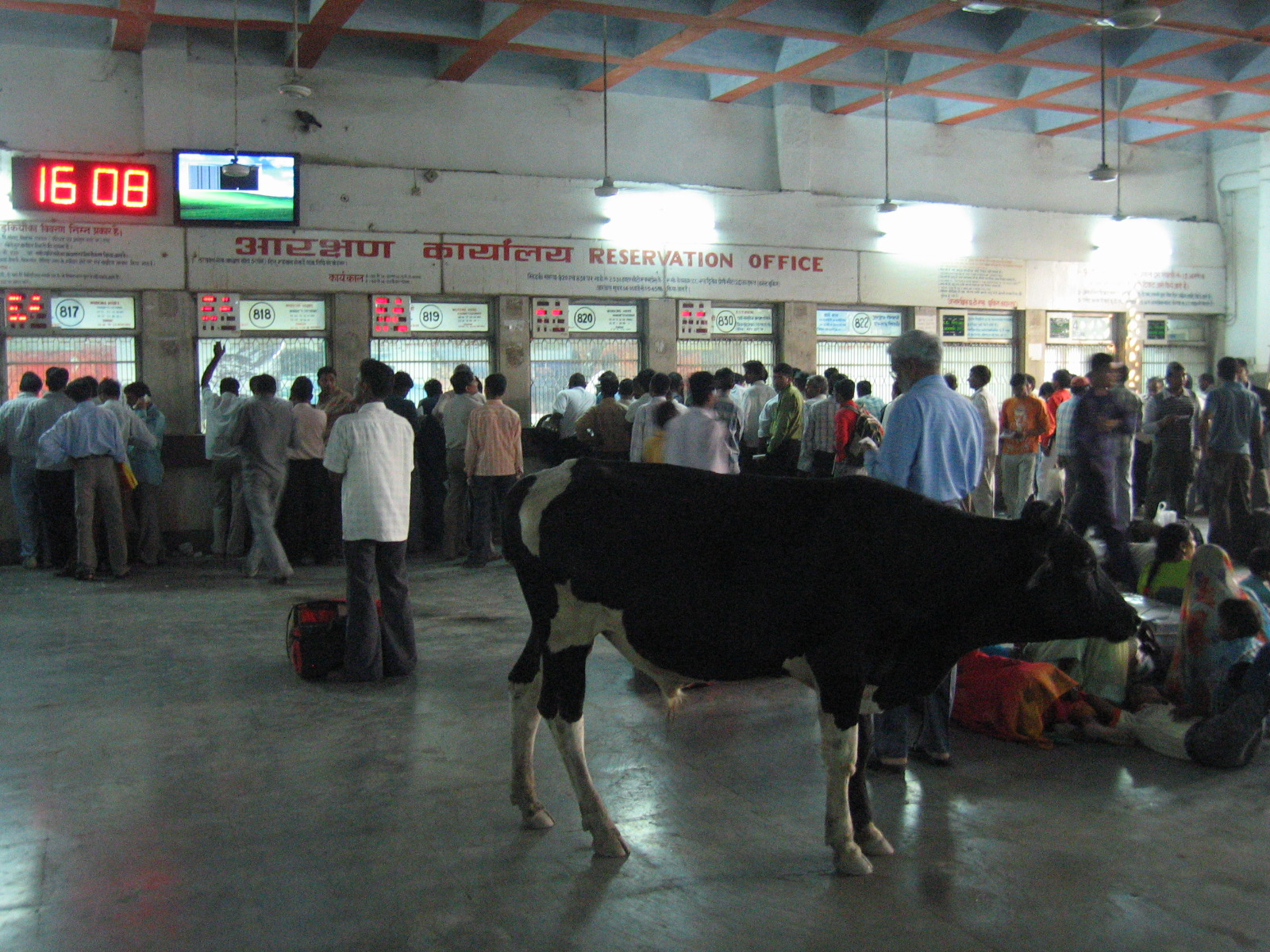
Stray cow at the ticket counters Ayodhya Junction railway station in Uttar Pradesh.

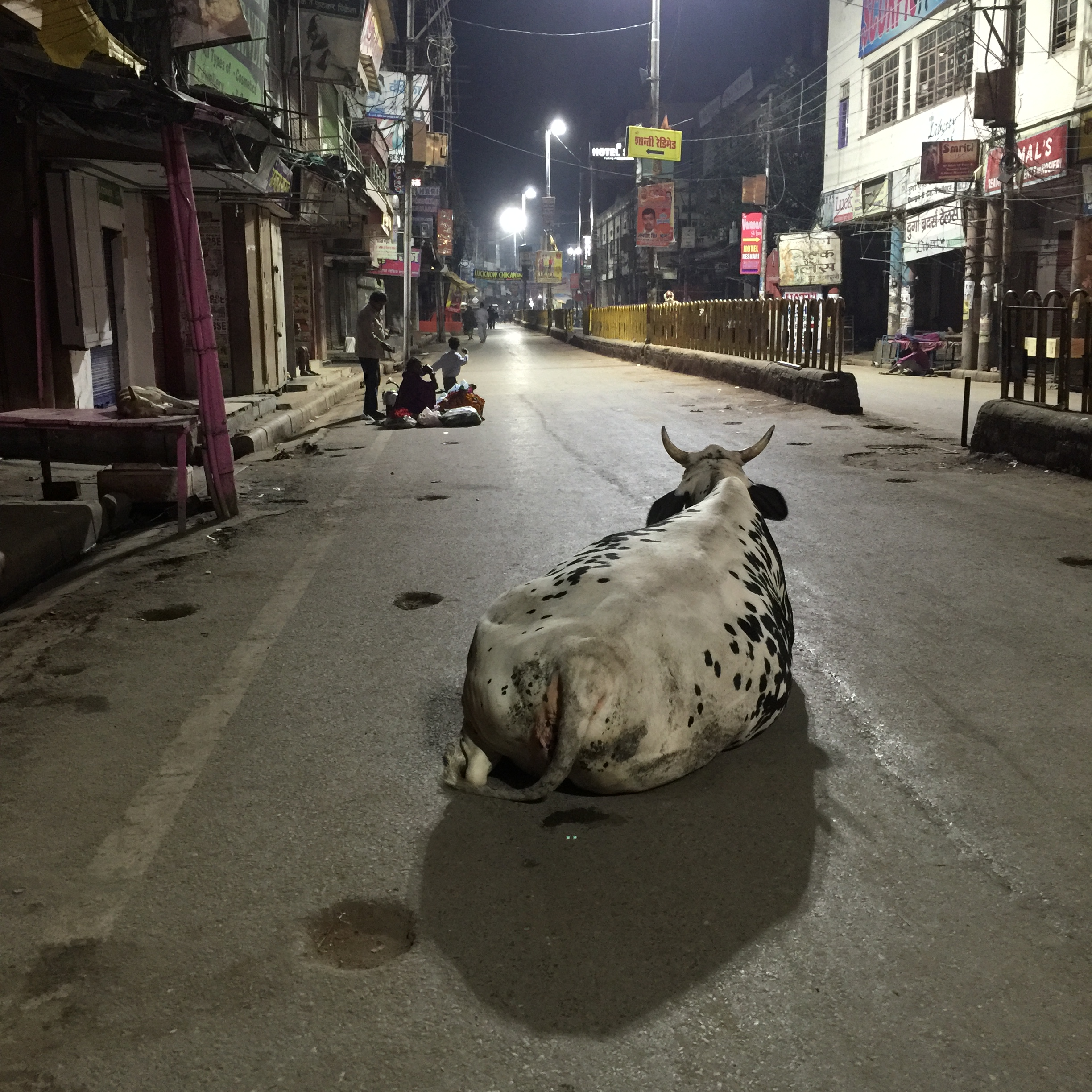
Stray cow resting in the middle of the road at night in Bangali Tola, Varanasi, Uttar Pradesh

In 2019, Vinay Kumar, the Uttar Pradesh vice-president of the farmers union, Bharatiya Kisan Union, had said "Cows are roaming in the open because there is no buyer and the promised gaushalas [cow shelters] are not operational. They are also destroying crops. Farmers chase them out of their fields. Railway lines are near fields, and the cattle go to open areas near the railway lines; some, unfortunately, come under a train."

The lack of adequate number of cowsheds (gaushalas) and the strict slaughter and trading laws were reported by The Wire as the main reasons for increase in cows roaming around and causing more cow related incidents in comparison to earlier years.

The Wire reported citing internal Indian Railways data, that in 2019 around 70 to 80 cattle were hit by trains in India daily. In 2014–2015 the number of cattle that were killed due to being overrun by trains was 2000 to 3000. It increased to 14,000 in 2017–2018. In the year 2018–2019 the number had increased to nearly 30,000, a record jump. It had become "a cause of deep concern for railway authorities".

All cases of cattle colliding with the trains do not end with the death of the cattle or the derailment of the train. According to Indian Railway data, about 18,900 trains were 'cattle-hit' in 2017–2018. The cases increased and around 43,000 trains were 'cattle-hit' in 2018–2019. In the period between April–May 2019, about 5,500 'cattle run over' (CRO) cases were recorded on the tracks, which affected the running of over 7,000 trains in two months. In August 2018, Indian Express reported a 362% jump in CRO cases from 2015-16 to 2017-2018.

In February 2019, at Etawah in Uttar Pradesh, the newly-launched Vande Bharat Express on its second day of service, had hit a stray cow. The aerodynamic nose of the train, made of steel with a fibre cover on it was damaged. A similar incident happened again on 17 August 2019.

According to railway officials, 'cattle run over' events disrupt operations for several hours, as the carcass must first be cleared from the track before the train can proceed. Fencing of the railway lines with concrete reinforced barbed wire have been suggested to reduce the incidents.

=== Roads ===
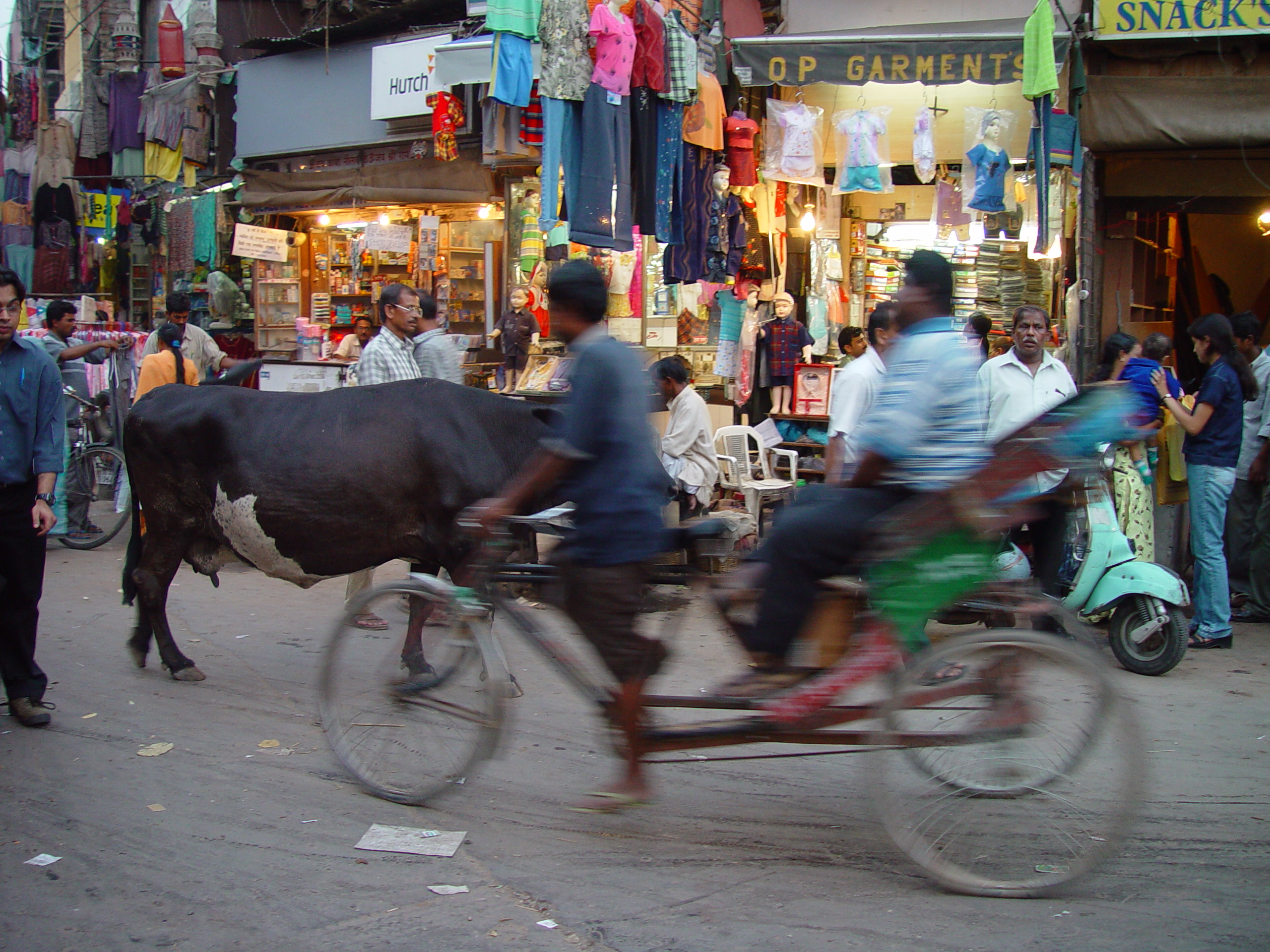
Stray cow on the road in Delhi

Stray cows are a frequent cause of road accidents in cities, where they crowd roads. Cow attacks on pedestrians and vehicles often become deadly. Stationary cows on the road are a cause of frequent deadly road accidents in India. Cattle dung also creates a road hazard for pedestrians and two-wheeled vehicles who may slip on it.

In Tiruvallur, in 2022, emergency braking by a semi truck driver to avoid a collision with stray cattle on the road caused a multiple-vehicle collision which killed one driver. Most of the accidents related to stray cattle on the roads occur at night, when it is harder to see the animal on roads with insufficient lights.

Historian, D. N. Jha had said, "In Delhi, cows should best be treated as a safety hazard. You cannot drive safely for the cows that stray around."

== Election issue ==
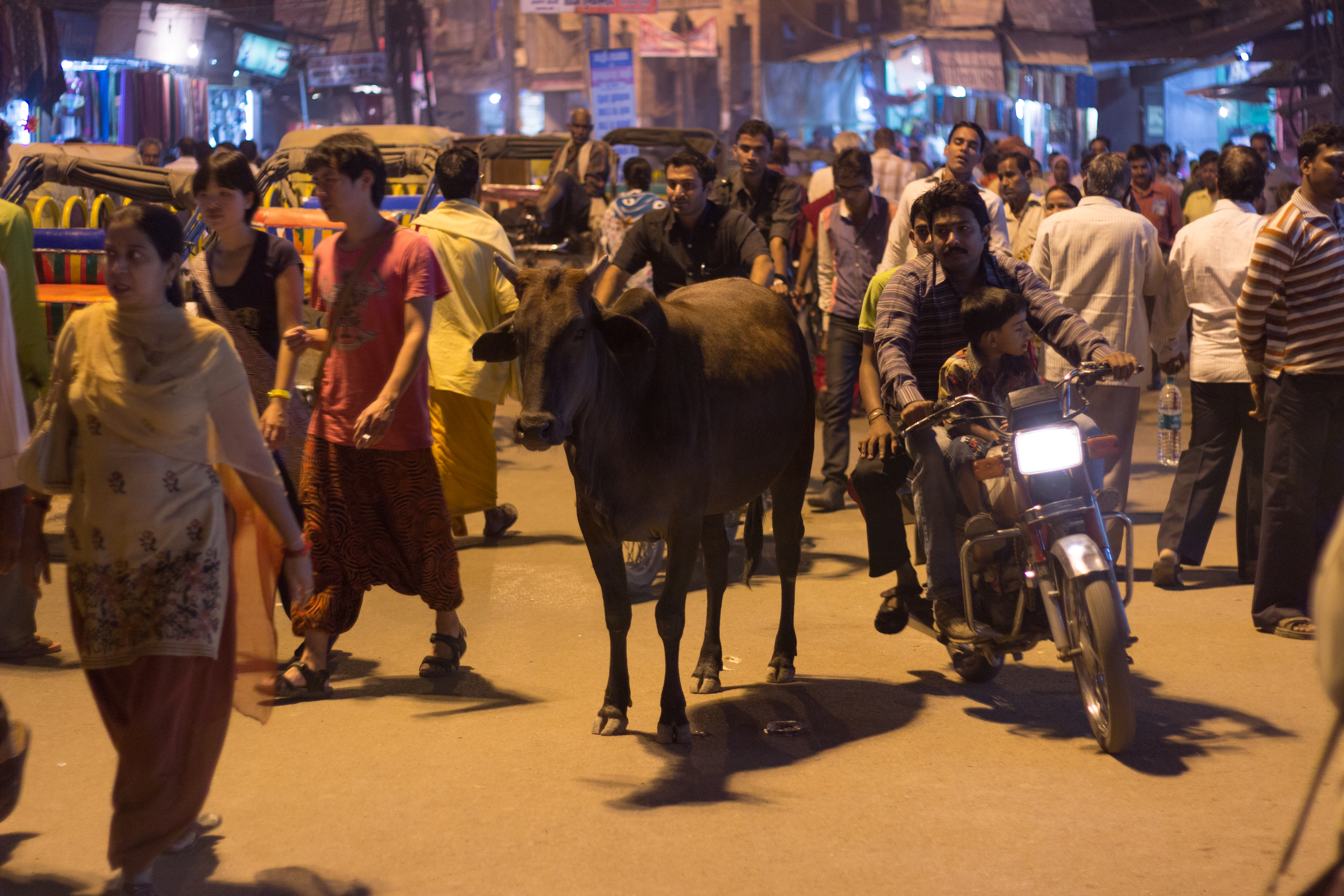
Stray cow on a busy street in Varanasi

The deadly attacks by stray cows were an election issue in the 2022 Uttar Pradesh Legislative Assembly election. In 2017, after coming to power in Uttar Pradesh, the Yogi Adityanath ministry promised to build cattle shelters to better manage the stray cattle. Since then, anti-cow-slaughter laws have been strictly enforced.

The main opposition party in 2021, Samajwadi Party (SP), promised compensation of ₹5 lakh (US$5,300) for farmers who were killed by bulls. SP promised to fix the root cause of the problem, removing the risk of trouble or harassment from the trading of livestock.

In 2022, BJP leaders denied that stray cattle was an issue, despite complaints from farmers that stray cattle were destroying crops. Speaking at a rally in Kanpur in February 2022, PM Narendra Modi acknowledged the issue in his rally and said that the Yogi government was trying to solve the problem by setting up cattle shelters.

On 22 February, local farmers released hundreds of cattle at the venue of an election rally in Barabanki located 40 km from the state capital, Lucknow. The act was to highlight the issues caused by the stray cattle in the area. In a viral video of the incident, hundreds of unattended cattle were seen roaming in the open rally ground.

== Governmental response ==
=== Laws ===
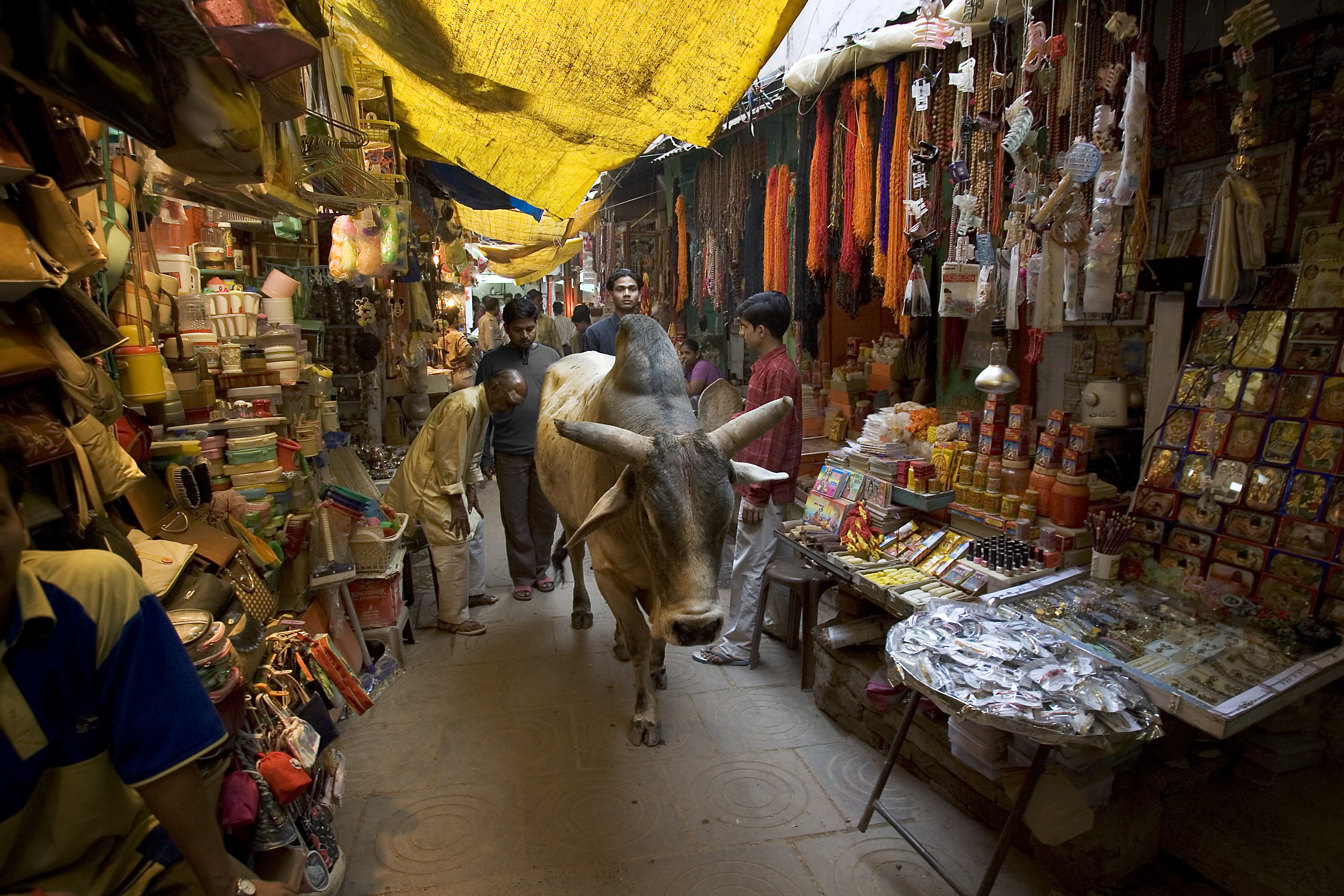
Stray bull in a market in Varanasi

In June 2020, the Uttar Pradesh government approved the Uttar Pradesh Cabinet Cow Slaughter Prevention (Amendment) Ordinance, 2020, that provided maximum sentences of 10 years imprisonment and fines of up to ₹5 lakh (US$5,300) for cow slaughter.

The residents of Tiruvallur district who allow their cattle to freely wander on the roads have been warned by the police. Imprisonment of up to three years and fines up to ₹5,000 are applicable according to the provisions of the Tamil Nadu Animals and Birds in Urban Areas (Control and Regulation) Act, 1997. Police have also threatened actions according to the Indian Penal Code and Prevention of Cruelty to Animals Act, in addition the stray cattle would be sent to cow sheds operated by the government. Yet these measures have not reduced the practice of cattle owners releasing their cattle. The authorities of Tiruvallur district have also set up a call center to report incidents of stray cattle.

=== Cow tax ===
The Adityanath ministry in the state of Uttar Pradesh introduced a special 0.5% tax named the "Cow Protection Cess" on eight government departments including the department that earns revenue from alcohol taxes. The cow protection cess was levied to earn money and maintain thousands of cow sheds operated by the government. The BBC reported that the tax did not solve the problem of stray cows, and the cow sheds were found to be overcrowded. In 2019, there were 510 cow shelters in the state of Uttar Pradesh registered in the state government records.

In 2021, it was reported that the Ludhiana Municipal Corporation had collected a cow cess of ₹3.5 crore every year, for taking care of stray cows. However, as of 2021, hundreds of stray cows were seen roaming in the streets on public places in Ludhiana city.

=== Cow sheds ===
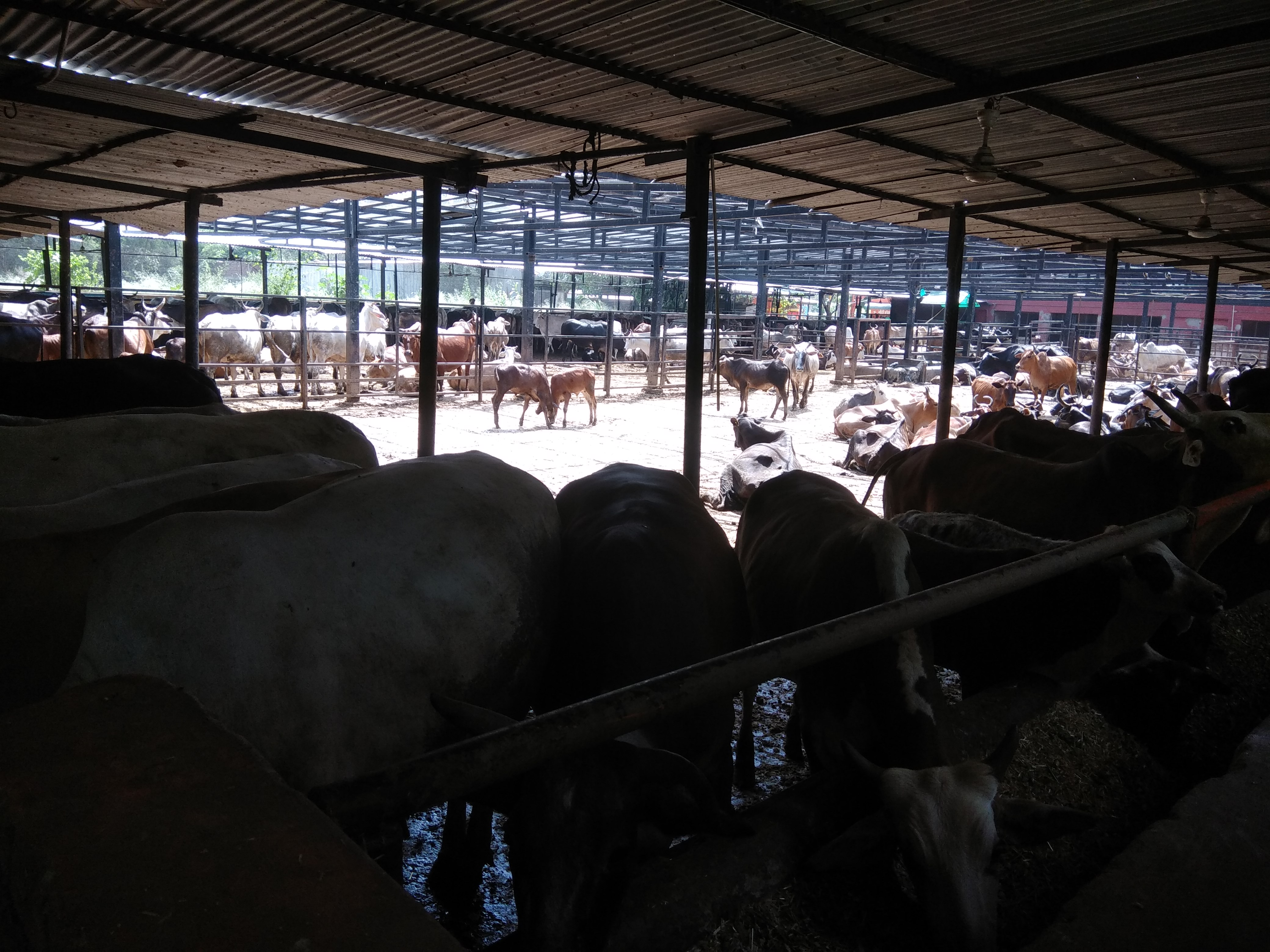
Gaushala (cow shed) in Sector 45, Chandigarh

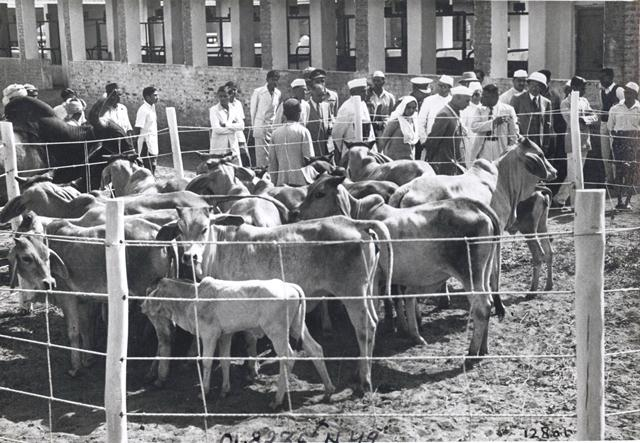
Prime Minister Jawaharlal Nehru visiting a Goshala during his Gujarat tour in 1949

Goshalas ('cow sheds') are shelters for unproductive, homeless, unwanted or elderly cattle in India. Since the BJP government came into power in India in 2014, India has spent ₹5.8 billion (US$62 million) on cow shelters in between the years 2014 and 2016.

The BJP state government claims to have provided money to the village pradhans to set up cow shelters to keep the stray cattle. The Deccan Herald reported that it could not find cattle shelters in the villages of Sitapur, Lakhimpur Kheri, Hardoi and Unnao districts. Places that had cow shelters, were already full with no capacity to keep more cattle.

Large scale corruption has been reported in the building and management of cow shelters in Uttar Pradesh and Madhya Pradesh. The contracts for the cow shelters were awarded to people associated with the ruling party, BJP, or the Rashtriya Swayamsewak Sangh.

Cattle housed in the cow shelters often starve to death due to lack of fodder, in shelters that are not maintained properly. Overcrowded shelters lack sufficient manpower to manage the large number of cows and the money allotted to feed the cattle is not sufficient due to the over crowding.

== See also ==
- Maverick (animal)
