= Animal welfare and rights in India =

Animal welfare in India
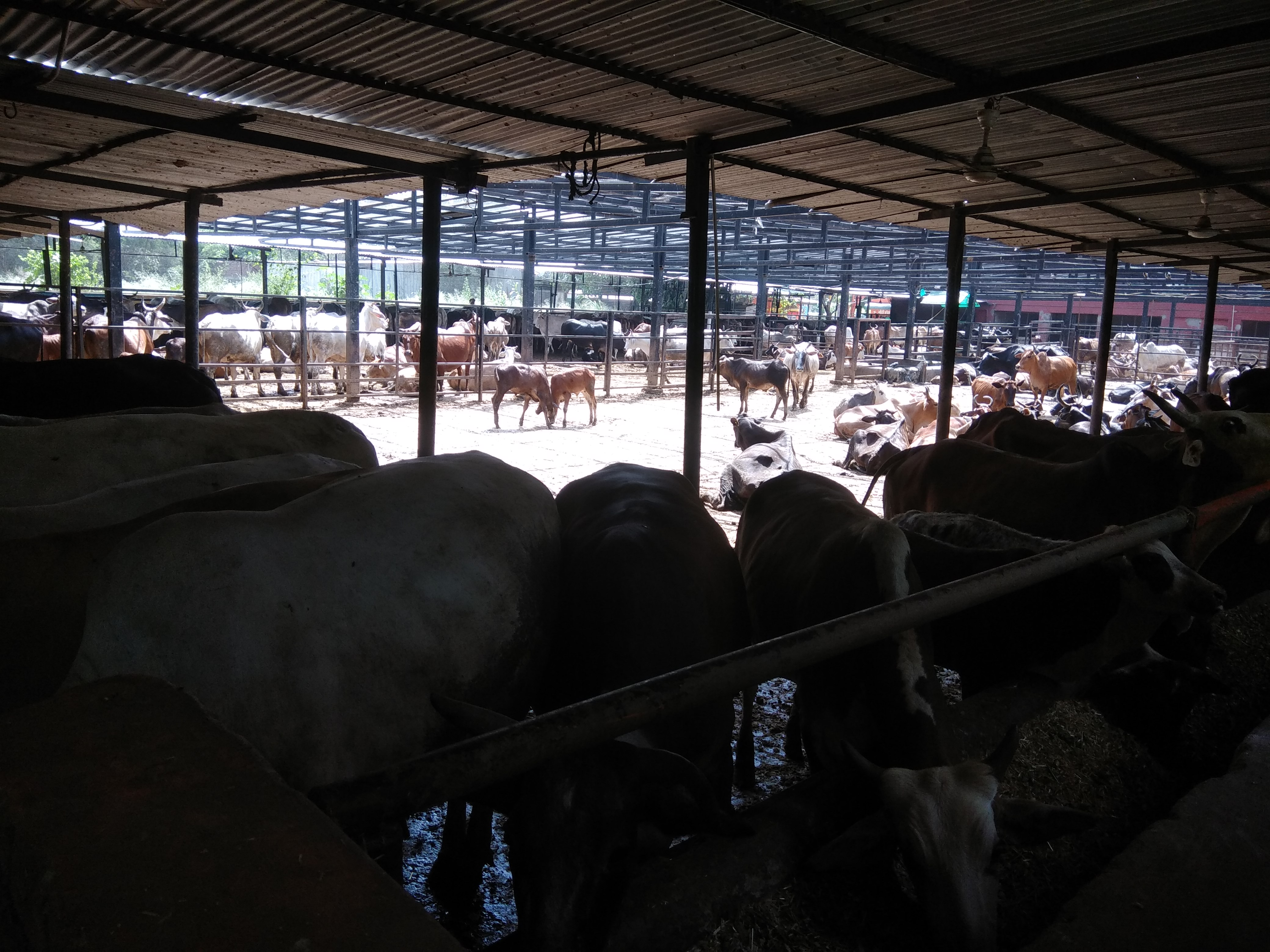
- A gaushala in Sector 45, Chandigarh
- Legislation: Prevention of Cruelty to Animals Act (1960)

Number of animals slaughtered annually for meat production
- Total: 3.12 billion (2022)
- Per capita: 2.2 (2022)

Proportion of population that does not eat meat
- Vegetarian: 22% (2018)
- Vegan: 19% (2018)

Animal welfare and rights in India regards the treatment of and laws concerning non-human animals in India. It is different from animal protection in India.

India is home to several religious traditions advocating non-violence and compassion towards animals, and has passed a number of animal welfare reforms since 1960. India is also one of the world's leading producers of animal products.

== History ==
=== Ancient India ===
The Vedas, the first scriptures of Hinduism (originating in the second millennium BCE), teach ahimsa or nonviolence towards all living beings. In Hinduism, killing an animal is regarded as a violation of ahimsa and causes bad karma, leading many Hindus to practice vegetarianism. Hindu teachings do not require vegetarianism, however, and allow animal sacrifice in rare religious ceremonies.

Jainism was founded in India in the 7th-5th century BCE, and ahimsa is its central teaching. Due to their belief in the sanctity of all life, Jains practice strict vegetarianism and many go to great lengths even to avoid harming insects.

Buddhism is the third major religion to emerge in India, and its teachings also include ahimsa. Buddhism teaches vegetarianism (though not as strictly as Jainism), and many Buddhists practice life release in which animals destined for slaughter are purchased and released to the wild. Despite the influence of Hinduism, Jainism, and Buddhism, meat-eating was still common in ancient India.

In 262 BCE, the Mauryan king Ashoka converted to Buddhism. For the remainder of his reign, he issued edicts informed by the Buddhist teachings of compassion for all beings. These edicts included the provision of medical treatment for animals and bans on animal sacrifice, the castration of roosters, and hunting of many species.

=== British India ===
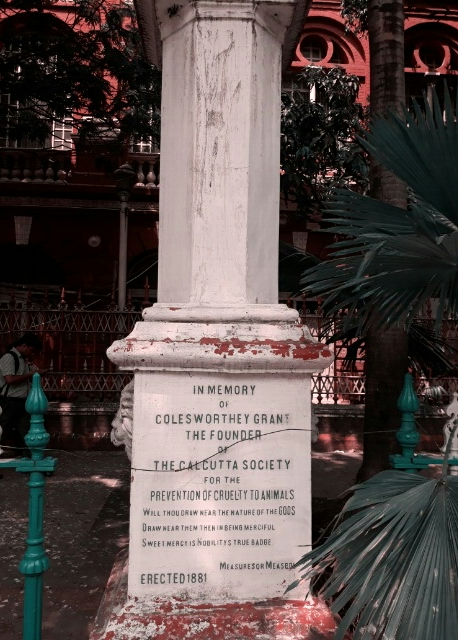
An obelisk was established in memory of the Colesworthey just in front of the Writers' Building.

Animal experimentation began in India in the 1860s when Britain began introducing new drugs to the colony. Moved by the suffering of Indian strays and draught animals, Colesworthey Grant founded the first Indian Society for the Prevention of Cruelty to Animals (SPCA) in 1861 in Calcutta. The Indian SPCA successfully lobbied for anti-cruelty legislation in Bengal in 1869, which was extended to apply to the Indian colony in 1890. British officials and British-led SPCAs both opposed the introduction of the British Cruelty to Animals Act 1876 – which established regulations on animal experimentation – to the Indian colony.

The cow protection movement first gained prominence in the late 1800s in northern India. While the SPCAs were led by colonists and associated with Christianity, cow protection was a movement of the Hindus populous. Cow protectionists opposed the slaughter of cattle and provided sanctuaries for cows. The Indian branches of the Humanitarian League, an English organization which opposed vivisection and the mistreatment and killing of animals, focused on vegetarianism and cow protection while ignoring vivisection. While the anti-vivisection movement grew in Britain, it failed to take hold in India.

Mahatma Gandhi was a vegetarian and advocate of vegetarianism. In 1931 Gandhi gave a talk to the London Vegetarian Society entitled The Moral Basis of Vegetarianism in which he argued for abstinence from meat and dairy on ethical (rather than health-related) grounds.

=== Post-independence India ===
India's first national animal welfare law, the Prevention of Cruelty to Animals Act (PCA) (1960), criminalizes cruelty to animals, though exceptions are made for the treatment of animals used for food and scientific experiments. The 1960 law also created the Animal Welfare Board of India to ensure the anti-cruelty provisions were enforced and promote the cause of animal welfare. The law is criticized for very low maximum fine of Rs. 50 for first offense and upto Rs. 500 for repeat offense, which is due to the act not having been revised in over two decades. Animal Welfare Board of India (AWBI) has proposed draft Indian animal welfare (amendments) act, 2011 which was tabled and further amended in 2014 imposing Rs. 10,000-5,00,000 and up to 2 years imprisonment for first offense or Rs. 75,000-10,00,000 and 1-2 years imprisonment for repeat offense, however failed to pass in the parliament. New draft submitted in 2014 incorporating Supreme Court directions to the parliament to implement amendments to the PCA, has also failed to be passed in parliament. Since 2016, two private member bill have been proposed and a public interest litigation opened for the subject. In 2022, the union ministry for animal husbandry proposed another draft amendment to PCA imposing a maximum of five-year imprisonment with a minimum 75 thousand rupees fine for killing an animal, or maximum 1.3 year imprisonment and/or 50 thousand rupees fine for life-threatening injury, despite overwhelming support has not been tabled in the parliament yet. In response to a parliamentary question answered on 3 February 2026, the ministry still considers the proposed bill as 'under examination'.

Section 428 and 429 of Indian Penal Code (IPC) made animal cruelty relating to killing, poisoning, maiming or 'rendering useless' of 'animals of value' (which excludes stray animals) a cognizable and bailable offense, although these do not prescribe a maximum fine, they prescribe maximum of two or five years imprisonment depending on the 'value of animal'. Since the adoption of Bharatiya Nyaya Sanhita (BNS), 2023, section 428 and 429 of IPC are replaced by section 325 of BNS that broadens same protection to all animals. Subsequent laws have placed regulations and restrictions on the use of draught animals, the use of performing animals, animal transport, animal slaughter, and animal experimentation. There are a number of animal welfare organizations operating in India, some of which also help assisting the population in reporting cruelty cases to the police and helping bring the perpetrator to justice such as the local SPCA, PF, A, and Fosterdopt. Both center and state have the power to legislate on prevention of animal cruelty.

The Breeding of and Experiments on Animals (Control and Supervision) Rules, 1998 sets general requirements for breeding and using animals for research. A 2006 amendment specifies that experimenters must first try to use animals "lowest on the phylogenetic scale", use the minimum number of animals for 95% statistical confidence, and justify not using non-animal alternatives. A 2013 amendment bans the use of live animal experiments in medical education. In 2014 India became the first country in Asia to ban all testing of cosmetics on animals and the import of cosmetics tested on animals.

India has a grade of C out of possible grades A, B, C, D, E, F, G on World Animal Protection's Animal Protection Index.

== Animals used for food ==
=== Legislation ===
The 1960 Prevention of Cruelty to Animals Act is the legal basis of animal protection in India. Provision 11 states that it is illegal for 'any person... [to treat] any animal so as to subject it to unnecessary pain or suffering or causes, or being the owner permits, any animal to be so treated', and that such mistreatment is punishable with fines or prison sentences. However, Kyodo News has reported that the maximum punishments are either a fine of 70 US cents, 3 months imprisonment or both, which is not enough to discourage animal cruelty. The law also states that the punishments do not apply 'to the preparation for destruction of any animal as food for mankind unless such destruction or preparation was accompanied by the infliction of unnecessary pain or suffering'. Moreover, provision 28 states 'Nothing contained in this Act shall render it an offence to kill any animal in a manner required by the religion of any community.' theoretically leaving open the option of unstunned ritual slaughter. On the other hand, stunning is required for animal slaughterhouses according to provision 6 of the Prevention of Cruelty to Animals (Slaughter House) Rules, 2001, and provision 3 states that slaughter is only permitted in recognised or licensed slaughterhouses. The Food Safety and Standards (Licensing and Registration of Food Businesses) Regulation, 2011 provides more precise stipulations surrounding the welfare of animals during the slaughter process, including that 'Animals are slaughtered by being first stunned and then exsanguinated (bled out). (...) Stunning before slaughter should be mandatory.' It further stipulates which three methods are legal (CO_{2} asphyxiation, mechanical concussion (gunshot or captive bolt pistol), and electronarcosis), the conditions in which these should be performed (such as separate spaces out of sight of other animals, with the proper equipment and the requirement that 'all operators involved are well trained and have a positive attitude towards the welfare of animals'), and explains why these are conducive to animal welfare. The regulation does not mention any exceptions or exemptions for religious or ritual slaughter.

In India, it is legal to confine calves in veal crates, pigs in gestation crates, hens in battery cages, and to remove farm animals' body parts without anesthesia.

=== Practice ===
According to The Times of India in 2012, most abbatoirs in India employed electronarcosis at 70 volts to render animals unconscious before slaughter. For unstunned ritual slaughter, scientific, religious and popular opinion remains divided on the question whether the dhabihah method (generally preferred by Muslims) or the jhatka method (generally Animal sacrifice preferred by Hindus and Sikhs) leads to less pain and stress and a quicker death for the animal in question. Indian Muslim scholars also disagree whether meat from animals that are stunned prior to ritual slaughter is to be considered halal, with some saying it is, and others saying it is not.

A major problem in India is that there is an insufficient number of legal slaughterhouses to meet consumer demand, and the federal and state governments sometimes appear unable to provide or stimulate the establishment of abbatoirs that are in compliance with the law, and unable to shut down the illegal abbatoirs. For example, as of February 2020, the state of Uttarakhand (10 million inhabitants) had no legal slaughterhouses at all. Animal Equality studied 5 chicken farms and 3 markets all in Maharashtra, Delhi, and Haryana on 2017 and reported that stunning to render the birds unconscious was not practised in any of the locations. The chickens would be thrown into drain bins after having their throat slit, where they would reportedly take several minutes to die.

Although dog meat is outlawed in India, the trade is still carried out in some Northeastern states, particularly Mizoram, Nagaland, and Manipur, as the meat is considered by some to have high nutritional and medicinal value. Indian animal activists and others have launched a campaign to end the trade in Nagaland, which sees more than 30,000 stray and stolen dogs reportedly beaten to death with clubs each year.

=== Cattle ===
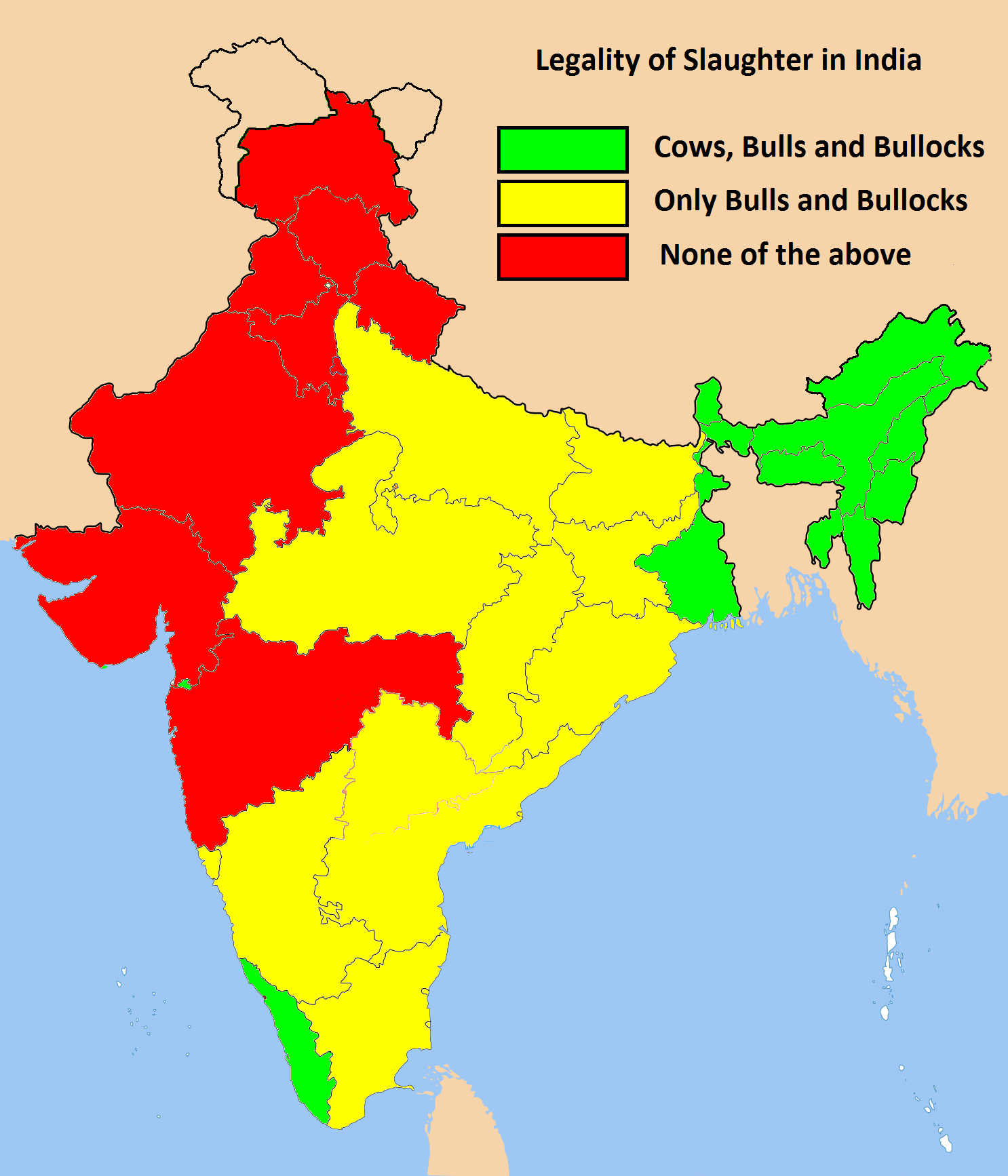
Indian state laws on cattle slaughter

The focus of animal welfare and rights debates in India has been on the treatment of cattle, since cows, unlike other animals, are considered to have a certain sacred status according to the majority of millions of Hindus (79.8%), Sikhs (1.7%), Buddhists (0.7%) and Jains (0.4%) living in India. However, cattle are generally not considered to be 'sacred' by others, such as followers of Abrahamic religions including Muslims (14.2%) and Christians (2.3%), as well as non-religious people (0.3%). Moreover, there is widespread disagreement among followers of Indian religions themselves on the level of protection and care that should be afforded to cows. In the post-independence era, a legal situation has evolved in which a number of states, mostly bordering on or relatively close to Pakistan, have completely banned all slaughter of cows, bullocks and bulls, while most in north, central and south India have only prohibited slaughtering bullocks and bulls, and finally some states far away from Pakistan (Kerala, West Bengal and the Northeast Indian states) have not enacted such restrictions on the slaughter of these animals at all. As far back as the 19th century, the legal prohibition of cattle slaughter has been part of Hindu nationalist agendas, and cow protection has been used as a means to distinguish Muslim and Hindu behaviour and identities. As of 2022, cow slaughter is illegal in 18 states in India.

=== Sale and consumption ===
Despite restrictions on killing and eating cows throughout most of the country, India became the world's largest exporter of beef in 2012. According to a 2012 FAO report, India also had the world's largest population of dairy cows (43.6 million) and was the second-largest producer of milk (50.3 million tons per year). In 2011, India was the third largest producer of eggs (behind China and the United States) and the sixth largest producer of chicken meat. India is the second largest fish producer in the world after China, and the industry has substantial room for growth.

A 2007 report by the Food and Agriculture Organization (FAO) of the United Nations found that Indians had the lowest rate of meat consumption of any country. Roughly one-third of Indians are vegetarian (the largest percentage of vegetarians in the world), but few are vegan. Despite having the highest rate of vegetarianism in the world, Indian consumption of dairy, eggs, and meat - especially chicken - was increasing rapidly as of 2013.

== Animals used for clothing ==
=== Fur ===
In 2012, Indian consumers purchased approximately Rs8.6 billion (approximately 129 million U.S. dollars) worth of fur products; this figure is projected to grow to Rs13 billion (approximately 195 million U.S. dollars) by 2018. Most of these products are supplied by domestic producers. Due to growing concern for animal welfare, in 2017 India banned the importation of certain animal furs and skins, including chinchilla, mink, fox, and reptiles.

=== Leather ===
Although cattle slaughter is illegal in all but two Indian states, poor enforcement of cattle protection laws has allowed a thriving leather industry. A 2014 report on the Indian leather industry states that India is the ninth largest exporter of leather and leather products, and the second largest producer of footwear and leather garments, with significant room for growth. The Indian government supports the industry by allowing 100% foreign direct investment and duty-free imports, funding manufacturing units, and implementing industrial development programs.

== Animals used in scientific research and cosmetics tests ==
India's 1960 anti-cruelty law created the Committee for the Purpose of Control and Supervision of Experiments on Animals (CPCSEA) to regulate animal experimentation. A 2003 report by Animal Defenders International and the U.K. National Anti-Vivisection Society based on evidence gathered by the CPCSEA during inspections of 467 Indian laboratories finds "a deplorable standard of animal care in the majority of facilities inspected". The report lists many instances of abuse, neglect, and failure to use available non-animal methods.

== Animals used in religion and entertainment ==
The Islamic festival of Eid Al Adha marks a global slaughter of animals every year. In recent times PETA has made appeals to muslims to do away with animal slaughter, however Islamist clerics in India have insisted that there is no alternative to animal slaughter and that it must take place. In 2013 India made it illegal to use captive dolphins for public entertainment. In 2014, the Supreme Court of India banned the traditional bullfighting sport Jallikattu, which was mainly practiced in the state of Tamil Nadu. This led to widespread controversy, and the 2017 pro-jallikattu protests. Under this pressure, the government of Tamil Nadu adopted a law that reintroduced the sport on state level, likely leading to a renewed ban by the Supreme Court. The sport remains a controversial issue.

== Strays ==
=== Dogs ===
There are many institutions and localities throughout the country where the stray dogs have been vaccinated and sterilised by local people and NGOs and often municipalities in accordance to Animal Birth Control (ABC) act 2001, where people care for, medicate and bond with these ‘community animals’. Netherlands and Bhutan have achieved respectively almost nil stray dogs population and hundred percent sterilised and vaccinated dog population by following similar birth control programmes, which has largely failed in India due to mismanagement and misuse of funds granted for the programme.

Due to the collapse of vulture populations in India, which formerly consumed large quantities of dead animal carcasses, the urban street dog population has increased and become a problem, especially in urban areas. With 30 million stray dogs in India estimated in 2015, conflicts have arisen in regions such as Bengaluru and Kerala on dealing with dog bites and the threat of rabies. Incidents of stray dogs chasing, attacking and biting school children, aged persons, pedestrians, morning walkers, or two-wheeler riders have led to panic and violent action from a handful of locals.

Animal cruelty is unconstitutional in India yet there is very low implementation of the existing laws paving way for cruelty to animals as there is no fear of repercussion among people including minors and children, and low repercussion for crimes relating to animal cruelty with existing laws such as PCA rule limiting maximum fine to Rs. 50 which has not been revised for more than two decades. Criminalization of animal cruelty before 2023 fell under section 428 and 429 of Indian Penal Code (IPC) which described animal cruelty for 'animals of value' only and did not cover stray animals. Cases relating to such incidents had to be registered under broad interpretation of laws. Heinous killings of stray animals are reported every month. Many cases have been reported where a group of minors or children have caught dogs to torture and have beaten them to death for fun. Naresh Kadyan, Master Trainer of the Animal Welfare Board of India said in 2017 that cases of dogs being bludgeoned with iron bars or burnt alive had taken place almost every month. It is noted that many of the attacks by dogs was caused by cruelty towards them both by adults and children. But once a bite happens it is rarely investigated why it happened and mostly the animal is held responsible and sometimes brutally killed by people or local authorities.

On 11 August 2025, the Supreme Court of India ordered removal of all stray dogs in Delhi NCR region and transferring them to shelters after an apex court took suo motu cognisance of news report of rabies impact on children. According to Indian Council of Medical Research (ICMR), in January 2025, 5,726 rabies deaths occur annually in India. On 22 August 2025, a special bench of judges set aside the orders and asked the states for disclosure of Animal Birth Control act 2001 compliance, however, subsequent inadequate report of ABC compliance by the states was asked to be revised and removal of all dogs living in 'institutional premise' was ordered to proceed.

=== Cattle ===
India has over 5 million stray cattle according to the livestock census data released in January 2020. Cows after reaching their fourth lactation have to be replaced by younger stock but due to anti-slaughter laws they are either set loose as strays, sent to Gaushalas which are shelters to protect cows, or smuggled across state borders to jurisdictions permitting slaughter, which is sometimes apprehended by cow-vigilantes resulting in violence. While stray cattle are a nuisance to traffic in urban areas and public well-being, the problem of solid waste pollution, especially plastic pollution and garbage dumped at public places, poses risk to stray cattle which feed on garbage. Many states advocating for anti-slaughter laws are investing in infrastructure for cow shelters and its maintenance as an alternative for aging cows, however, the inability of funds and infrastructure to cater to the task has been criticized.

== See also ==
- Timeline of animal welfare and rights
- List of animal rights advocates
