= Federation of Indian Animal Protection Organisations =

- Established: 25 November 2010
- Address: A-86, East of Kailash, New Delhi- 110065
- Location: East of Kailash, New Delhi, Delhi, India
- Website: www.fiapo.org

The Federation of Indian Animal Protection Organisations (FIAPO) is the collective voice of the animal protection movement in India. It is a building bridge between activists, organisations and volunteers working together to stand up to liberate all non-human animals to a life free from exploitation and suffering. FIAPO is the catalyst that protects the rights and interests of animals at local and national levels. It is the only federation with more than 190 member organisations, and 1800+ activists active in more than 110 cities in India. Created by the movement, for the movement! FIAPO was registered on 25 November 2010 under the Indian Trusts Act, 1882.

== Values ==
It promotes Five Basic Freedoms specifically for animals and generally for all living beings. FIAPO promotes peace as an alternative solution to the notion held by any culture, custom or religion that animals are property of humanity which can be used by humanity as commodities, labourers or as natural, harvest-able resources.

- Freedom from Hunger and Thirst: by Providing access to fresh water and a diet to maintain full health and vigour.
- Freedom from Discomfort: by providing an appropriate shelter and resting area.
- Freedom from Pain, Injury or Disease: by prevention or rapid diagnosis and treatment.
- Freedom to Express Normal Behaviour: by providing sufficient space, proper facilities and company of the animal's own kind.
- Freedom from Fear and Distress: by ensuring conditions and treatment which avoid mental suffering.

== Wildlife Protection Amendment bill ==
In 2022, a Wildlife Protection Amendment Bill was introduced in parliament on the last session of the Winter session which was held on 23 December 2021 to legalise trade in elephants. A petition was filed by FIAPO calling for the dilution of Section 43 of the Wildlife Protection Amendment Act.

== See also ==
- Animal welfare and rights in India
- Awarded by Bhagwan Mahaveer Award in Non Violence & Vegetarianism in 2021.
