= Madras Flying Club =

Madras Flying Club MFC
- Active: 19 November 1929–present
- Country: India
- Type: Training
- Role: Commercial flying training
- Garrison/HQ: Chennai International Airport 1929–2019; Tiruchirappalli International Airport 2019–present
- Nickname(s): MFC

Madras Flying Club is an aviation academy in Tiruchi, India. It offers courses on pilot training, aircraft maintenance, and cabin crew management, among others. It is one of the oldest aviation academies in the country.

== Location ==
Originally based in Chennai, the Madras Flying Club has been based at Gate No. 1 at Tiruchirappalli International Airport in Tiruchi since 2019.

== History ==
The Madras Flying Club was established in Madras in October 1929 as a private club, long before passenger traffic commenced at the city's airport. It was established by a pilot named G. Vlasto. It commenced on 19 November 1929 with a meeting at the Madras Guards Institute on Poonamallee High Road. In the meeting, which was presided over by Chitty, W/Cdr. A. Cooper, the then Secretary of the Aero Club of India, addressed the gathering announcing the formation of a new flying club at Madras with the financial grant from the Director of Civil Aviation. The flying club was incorporated on 4 March 1930, and, with the subsidy for commencing flying programs granted in April 1930, the flying club was formally inaugurated on 20 August 1930 by Sir George Frederick Stanley, the then Governor of Madras, who was also the first patron of the flying club. With Flt. Lt. H. N. Hawker as the first pilot instructor and M. W. Hulcoop as the first flight engineer, the first instructional flight took place on 21 July 1930. The first two aircraft, VCT-ABH and VT-ABI, were named by Lady Beatrix Stanley as "Garuda" and "Pushpak", respectively. Mohammed Ismail Khan became the first Indian instructor, who served with the Club from 1942. The Club's chief flying instructor, Tyndale-Biscoe, flew the first international flight from Madras to Colombo in 1935.

First members of the club include three Nattukkottai Chettiars, namely Avadaiappan, S. A. A. Annamalai and Solaiappan. In 1931, Avadaiappa Chettiar became the fifth person and the first Indian to get a private pilot's licence. Soon after, also in 1931, Annamalai Chettiar became the sixth person and the second Indian on the list. Solaiappan became the 21st person on the list. All the three owned aircraft and started a flying club in the village of Kanadukathan in their homeland, 250 miles south of Madras.

After Independence, under the president-ship of Jawaharlal Nehru, the flying club celebrated its silver jubilee in October 1955. On 12 September 2009, the flying club celebrated its 80th anniversary. In November 2018, the flying club announced shifting its operations from the Chennai International Airport to the Tiruchi International Airport.

== The flying club ==
Beginning with the initial fleet of the Puss Moths, Tiger Moths, and Chipmunks, and then to Pushpak, the modern fleet of the flying club include the glass-cockpit Cessna 172 R. The flying club has a total fleet strength of 6 aircraft, including three Cessna 152A, two Hansa 3, and one Cessna 172 R. Recently, the flying club acquired an Iskara jet engine from the Indian Air Force for education and exhibit purpose.

The flying club has an aviation library, three air-conditioned, computer-aided smart class rooms and conference hall with audio and visual equipment. The flying club also has plans to collaborate with a foreign aviation organization to enhance the training quality. The flying club is registered under the Tamil Nadu Societies Registration Act 1975 and is recognised by the Directorate General of Civil Aviation, New Delhi. In its first 90 years of operations, the flying club has produced more than 1,500 pilots. The Tamil Nadu government has allotted two acres of land adjoining the Tiruchi airport for the development of the flying club's infrastructure.

In 2020, the flying club collaborated with Bishop Heber College in Tiruchi to offer aviation-related degree and diploma courses to be awarded by the Bharathidasan University. An aero lab equipped with aero engines and other aviation-related equipment is being set up in Bishop Heber College. Courses offered include three-year bachelor of science degrees separately in aviation and aircraft maintenance, a six-month pilot-training course, post-graduate diploma in airline operations, air hostesses and airport ground handling, a one-year diploma courses for assistant flight dispatchers, and a six-month certificate course for customer service agents.

== See also ==
- Flight training school
