= Prevention of Cruelty to Animals Act, 1960 =

Act of the Parliament of India

Parliament of India
- Long title: An Act to consolidate and amend the law relating to Prevention of Cruelty to Animals
- Citation: THE PREVENTION OF CRUELTY TO ANIMALS ACT, 1960 (Note: Exception for the erstwhile State of Jammu and Kashmir omitted by Jammu and Kashmir Reorganisation Act, 2019)
- Territorial extent: India
- Commenced: 1 April 1974

Related legislation
- Wildlife Protection Act, 1972
- Status: In force (amended)

The Prevention of Cruelty to Animals Act, 1960, is an Act of the Parliament of India enacted in 1960 to prevent the infliction of unnecessary pain or suffering on animals and to amend the laws relating to the prevention of cruelty to animals. The act defines "animal" as 'any living creature other than a human being'.

Chapter II of the Act details the establishment of a governing body to promote and enforce the Act. As per the provisions of the law, in 1962, the government of India formed the Animal Welfare Board of India and appointed noted humanitarian and acclaimed dancer Rukmani Devi Arundale as steward.

Chapter III of the Act lists different forms of cruelty that are banned by the Act, including those related to work animals, captivity, ownership, abuse, mutilation or killing.

Chapter IV of the Act deals with experimentation on animals. While it does not make it unlawful to perform experiments on animals for the advancement of knowledge, it does allow the Board to advise the Central Government to create a committee for the "purpose of controlling and supervising experiments on animals". The formed committee can then be authorized to inspect any institution or place that is suspected of violating the rules set out under chapter 17 of the Act, and subject to penalties detailed in section 20 upwards to the amount of 200 rps (approx. $2.46).

Chapter V outlines the restrictions, procedures for registration, offences to and exemptions for performing animals. It does not expressly prohibit any animal from exhibition or training, but allows the Central Government to deem an animal prohibited through the notification in the Official Gazette. However, in individual cases, a court or magistrate can prohibit a person from these activities, if it has proven that "the training or exhibition of any performing animal has been accompanied by unnecessary pain or suffering". Penalties for offences of chapter V are a maximum of 500 rps (approx. $6.14) fine or up to three months imprisonment. Exemptions are made for the use of trained animals by the military and police and animals kept in zoos or on display for other educational and scientific purposes.

The act however makes a provision under heading [Chapter VI, Heading 28]: "Saving as respects manner of killing prescribed by religion: Nothing contained in this Act shall render it an offence to kill any animal in a manner required by the religion of any community." Chapter VI also includes regulations on the seizing of animals from owners, treatment and care of those seized animals, the limits of prosecution and the delegation of powers of the Central Government to enforce this Act.

== Proposed amendments ==
According to the draft amendments to Indian animal welfare act, 2011 proposed by AWBI, cruelty to animals is an offense and is punishable with a fine which shall not be less than ten thousand Rupees, which may extend to twenty-five thousand rupees or with imprisonment up to two years or both in the case of a first offense. In the case of a second or subsequent offense, with a fine which shall not be less than fifty thousand Rupees, but may extend to one lakh Rupees and with imprisonment with a term which shall not be less than one year but may extend to three years. The Supreme Court of India instructed Parliament to update the law to 'make proper amendment of the PCA Act to provide an effective deterrent to achieve the object and purpose of the Act', in the case of Animal Welfare Board of India (AWBI) vs A Nagaraja & Ors (2014) whose recommendations were incorporated in a new draft proposed in 2014, which has not been passed in parliament. The new draft proposed up to 2 years imprisonment and Rs. 10,000-5,00,000 fine for first offense and 1-3 years imprisonment and/or Rs. 75,000-10,00,000 fine for repeat offense of animal cruelty. The bill also imposed restriction on breeding, sale and experimentation of animals and ban on all entertainment events that inflict harm on animals.

Since 2016, there have been two private member bills requiring stricter laws regarding animal cruelty and a public interest litigation. In the following years, and after numerous high-profile animal cruelty cases in the media, animal welfare organisations and political leaders called for the law to be amended, including Kishanganj MP Mohammed Jawed in 2020, Kendrapara MP Anubhav Mohanty in 2021, and in 2020 'a group of MPs cutting across party lines wrote to then Animal Husbandry Minister Giriraj Singh, urging that the punishment in the 1960 Act be increased'.

In late 2022, the Ministry of Fisheries, Animal Husbandry and Dairying, submitted a draft Prevention of Cruelty to Animals (Amendment) Bill 2022 for public comment. The draft includes 61 amendments that aim to further clarify the law and make punishments more stringent. The amendment includes 'bestiality' as crime, under the new category of 'gruesome cruelty', while increasing the penalties for violation from the current (first time) fines of Rs 10 - 50 (approx $0.12 - $0.61), to Rs 50,000 - 75,000 ($614.00 - $921.50), 'or the cost of the animal, whichever is more or with the imprisonment of one year to 3 years or with both'. The draft Bill also allows for many offences to be made cognizable, which allows for arrests without an arrest warrant and in cases of killing an animal, a maximum punishment of up to five years in jail. Also included is an outline of the five freedoms guaranteed to animals: freedom from thirst, hunger and malnutrition; freedom from discomfort due to environment; freedom from pain, injury and diseases; freedom to express normal behavior for the species; freedom from fear and distress.

Public comments were collected until 7 December 2022, and once the bill is final, it could be brought to the Parliament in either their Winter Session or Budget Session. In response to a parliamentary question answered on 3 February 2026, the ministry still considers the proposed bill as 'under examination' despite not being tabled in the parliament yet.

== Additional resources ==
Naresh Kadyan, Chief National Commissioner along with Mrs. Sukanya Berwal, Commissioner on Education, Scouts & Guides for Animals & Birds, introduced two legal books, related to PCA Act, 1960 in Hindi along with mobile app: Scouts & Guides for Animals & Birds. Abhishek Kadyan, along with Mrs. Suman Kadyan, also contributed from Canada.
