= Animal Welfare Board of India =

Government body

The Animal Welfare Board of India (AWBI), headquartered at Ballabhgarh in Haryana state, is a statutory advisory body advising the Government of India's Ministry of Fisheries, Animal Husbandry and Dairying (Department of Animal Husbandry and Dairying). The AWBI headquarters were previously situated in Chennai.

== History ==
The Animal Welfare Board of India was established in 1962 under Section 4 of The Prevention of Cruelty to Animals Act, 1960. Well-known humanitarian Rukmini Devi Arundale participated in setting up the board and was its first chair. The Board consists of 28 Members, who serve for a period of 3 years. Its headquarters were in Chennai, and moved to Ballabhgarh in Faridabad district of Haryana in early 2018.

The board was initially within the jurisdiction of the Government of India's Ministry of Food and Agriculture. In 1990, the subject of prevention of cruelty to animals was transferred to the Ministry of Environment, Forests, and Climate Change, where it is now managed by the Ministry of Fisheries, Animal Husbandry, and Dairying. R.M. Kharb was the first veterinarian to have been appointed as AWBI chairperson in the five-decade history of the board.

=== Lab animals ===
Concerned about the abuse of animals in research, in the board's early history, it recommended that the government create the Committee for the Purpose of Control and Supervision of Experiments on Animals (CPCSEA). The committee was created, and the board's representative Dr. S. Chinny Krishna deposed twice before the Committee about "the dismal state of laboratories in India."

A number of years passed before the subject was "taken up effectively by the Government." In 2001, the government passed rules covering the breeding and experimentation on animals.

=== Animals in entertainment ===
Another early concern of the board was the cruelty involved when animals were used in entertainment. In 1964, the board published the booklet, "Circuses - Amusement for the Uncivilised". In 2001, the government passed the Performing Animals Rules, which were amended in 2005. In 2012, the Board reported that the Rules were being implemented.

== Functions ==
Some of the functions of the board include:

=== Recognition of Animal Welfare Organisations ===
The board oversees Animal Welfare Organisations (AWOs) by granting recognition to them if they meet its guidelines. The organisation must submit the necessary paperwork; agree to nominate a representative of the Animal Welfare Board of India on its executive committee; and agree to regular inspections. After meeting the requirements and going through an inspection, the organisation is considered for the grant of recognition. The AWBI also appoints people to the positions of (Hon) Animal Welfare Officers, who serve as a point of contact between the people, the government, and law enforcement agencies.

=== Financial assistance ===
The board provides financial assistance to recognized Animal Welfare Organisations (AWOs), who submit applications to the Board. Categories of grants include Regular Grant, Cattle Rescue Grant, Provision of Shelter House for Looking After the Animals, Animal Birth Control (ABC) Programme, Provision of Ambulance for the Animals in Distress and Natural Calamity Grant.

=== Animal welfare laws and rules ===
The board suggests changes to laws and rules about animal welfare issues. In 2011, a new draft Animal Welfare Act was published for comment. Guidance is also offered to organisations and officials such as police to help them interpret and apply the laws.

=== Raising awareness ===
==== Publications ====
The board issues publications to raise awareness of various animal welfare issues.

==== Education ====
The Board's Education Team gives talks on animal welfare subjects, and trains members of the community to be Board Certified Animal Welfare Educators.

==== Events ====
The Animal Welfare Board of India planned Cow Hug Day in February 2023.

== Activism ==
=== Legal rights of animals ===
Animal Welfare Board of India filed a case in the court against "Nagaraja" in 2014 to ask for the rights of animals, Naresh Kadyan, chairman of PFA Haryana was also petitioner with AWBI. In that case, the court mandated that the animals are also entitled to the fundamental right to freedom enshrined in the Article 21 of Constitution of India i.e. right to life, personal liberty and the right to die with dignity (passive euthanasia).

== See also ==
- Animal welfare and rights in India
- Conservation in India
- Environmental policy of India
- National Human Rights Commission of India
