= Saptur =

- village
- Location in Tamil Nadu, India Saptur (India)
- Coordinates: 9.69°N 77.59°E
- Country: India
- State: Tamil Nadu
- District: Madurai

Languages
  - Official: Tamil
- Time zone: UTC+5:30 (IST)
- PIN: 625705
- Telephone code: 04552

Saptur is a village in Madurai district, Tamil Nadu, India.

== History ==
Saptur, traditionally recognised as one of the 72 palaiyams of Madura, was situated about 15 km from T.Kallupatti. It was part of Tirunelveli and was transferred in 1859 to Madura District (present day Madurai district).

Saptur is derived from two Telugu words, sapa (mat) and oota (spring).

== Geography ==
Saptur is located on the foothills of the Western Ghats and is in Peraiyur taluk.

== Demographics ==
At the 2011 Census of India, Saptur was the largest village in Madurai district by area, being 20,901 ha (51,650 acres). It then had a population of 7170.
