= Kupalantham Poigai malai Jain Cave Temple =

Jain cave temple in Tamil Nadu

- சமணக் குகைக் கோவில் குப்பல்நத்தம், பொய்கைமலை
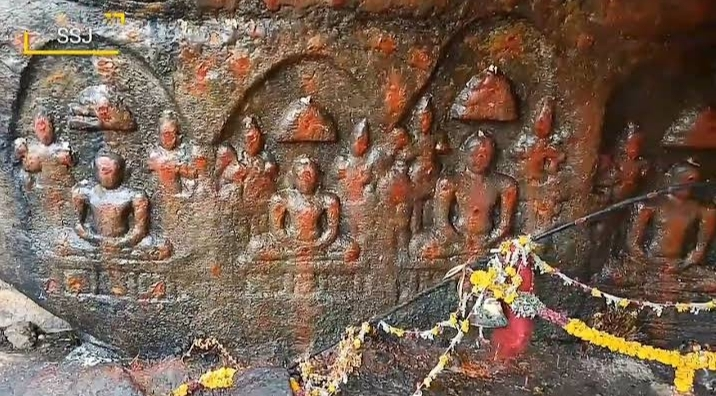
- Kuppalnatham Poigai malai Jain temple

- Location within Tamil Nadu

Religion
- Affiliation: Jainism
- Sect: Digambara
- Deity: Tirthankara
- Festivals: Mahavir Jayanti, Chithirai thiruvilla

Location
- Location: Kuppalnatham, Madurai, Tamil Nadu
- Interactive map of Kupalantham Poigai malai Jain Cave Temple
- Coordinates: 9°49′18″N 77°48′32″E

Architecture
- Established: 9th century
- Temple: 1
- Inscriptions: 1

Kuppalnatham Poigai malai Jain cave is located on the Poigai malai hill on Kuppalnatham village, K paramanpatti, Peraiyur taluk of Madurai district in the state of Tamil Nadu. The temple is located on the traditional trade route. Kuppalnatham Jain temple was built during the 9th-10th century A.D. near the river. This temple is one of the important eighteen Jain Sites of Madurai District.

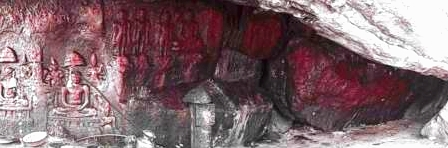
Kuppalnatham

A mutilated cursive inscription is found under the Tirthankar figures. Five of the Tirthankaras here have performed five Thirumenis. The inscription mentions that one of them was a female servant are founded on Jain cave, which is well protected by the local village people. On the day chithra pournami the Sri Vengdajalpathi Perumal Temple Kuppalnatham kallalgar Chithirai thiruvilla festival was celebrated near the river of Jain temple like madurai and it also called Chithirai thiruvilla. The Many villages like kuppalnatham, chinnakkatlai, Sedapatti, senampatti etc villages they gathered and celebrate the festival.

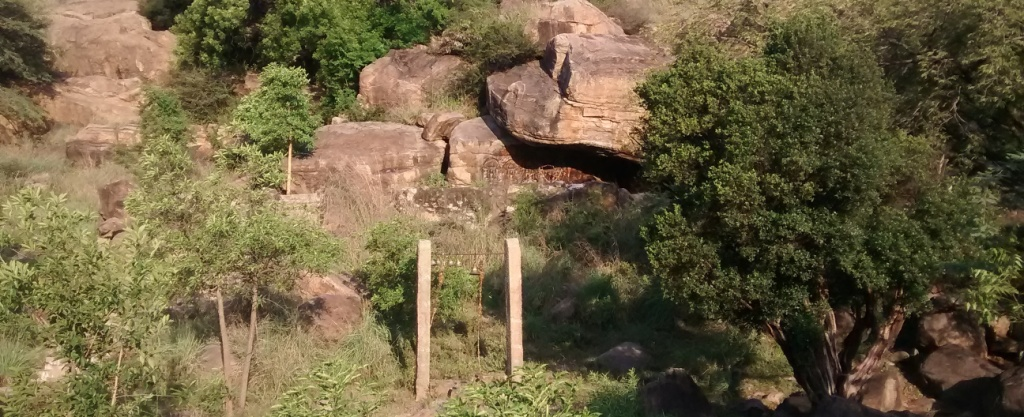
Kuppalnatham

Kuppalnatham jain cave temple was 100 feet from ground and the temple was on west side of Poigai malai hill near gounda nathi river.

== Heritage Movement on kuppalnatham jain cave temple ==
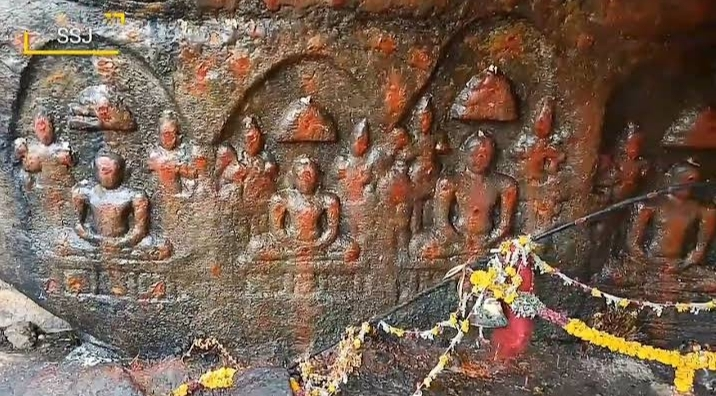
Kuppalnatham jain cave temple located on kuppalnatham Poigai K Paramanpatti village near gounda nathi river.

The DHAN Foundation organized a Heritage Walk in 2018 in collaboration with INTACH Madurai Chapter, Madurai Travel club with the support of Host Communities and Vayalagam Federations of Gundar Upper Region. More than 100 people participated. Dr. V. Vedachalam Archaeologist gave technical support. A brochure on Kuppalnatham Jain Monuments was released to the host communities and local youths.
