= Samanar Hills =

Hills in Tamil Nadu, India

Samanar Malai
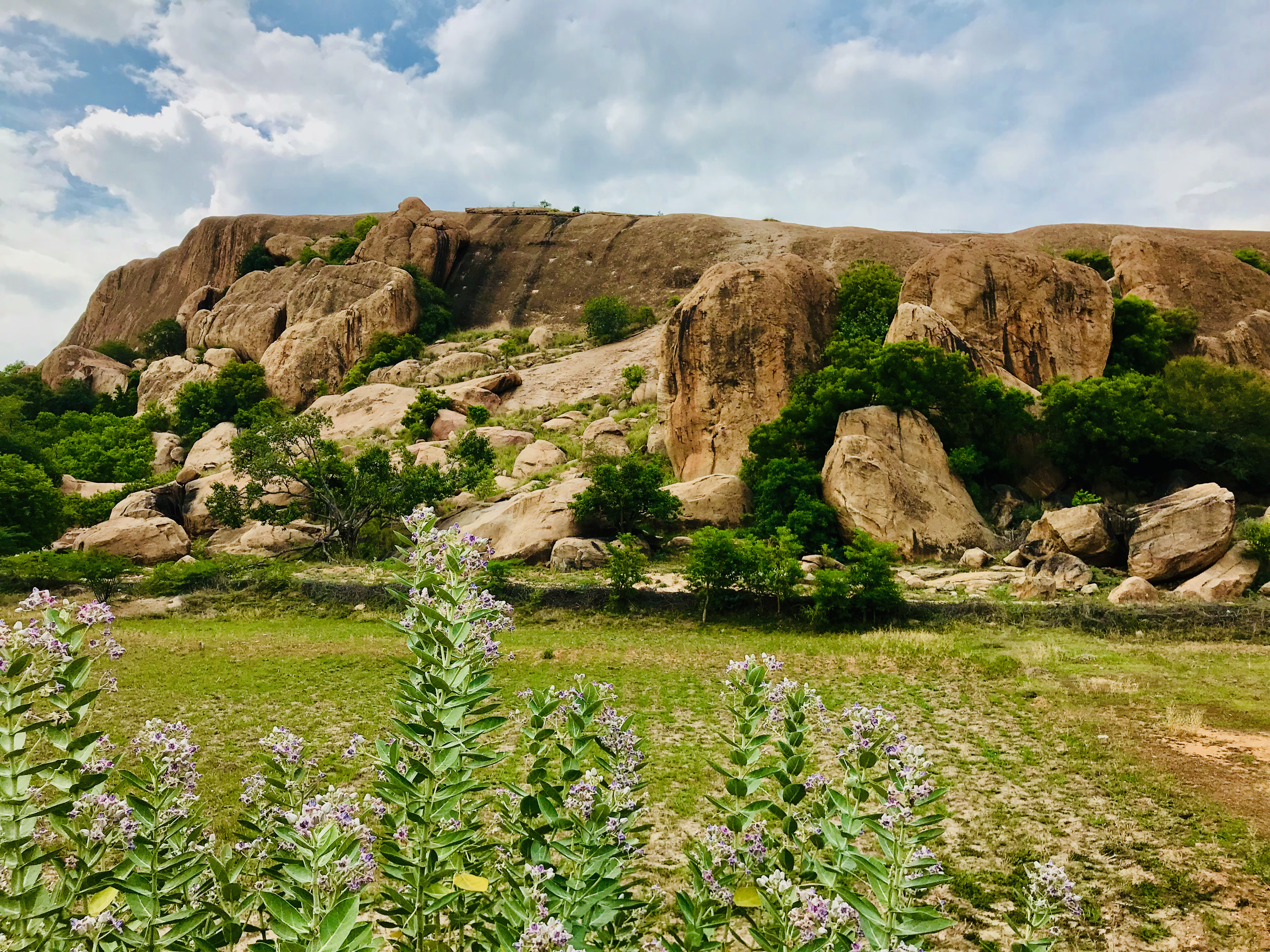
- Samanar Hills

Religion
- Affiliation: Jainism, Hinduism

Location
- Location: Vadivelkari Village, Tamil Nadu
- Interactive map of Samanar Malai

Architecture
- Established: 2000 years old
- Completed: 9th century CE

Samanar Hills, also known as Samanar Malai or Amanarmalai or Melmalai, is a rocky stretch of hills located near Vadivelkari village, 10 kilometres (6.2 mi) west of Madurai city, Tamil Nadu, India. They stretch east–west over 3 kilometers towards Muthupatti village. These rocky hillocks are home to many Jain and Hindu monuments. The hill has been declared as a protected monument by the Archaeological Survey of India.

== Location and history ==
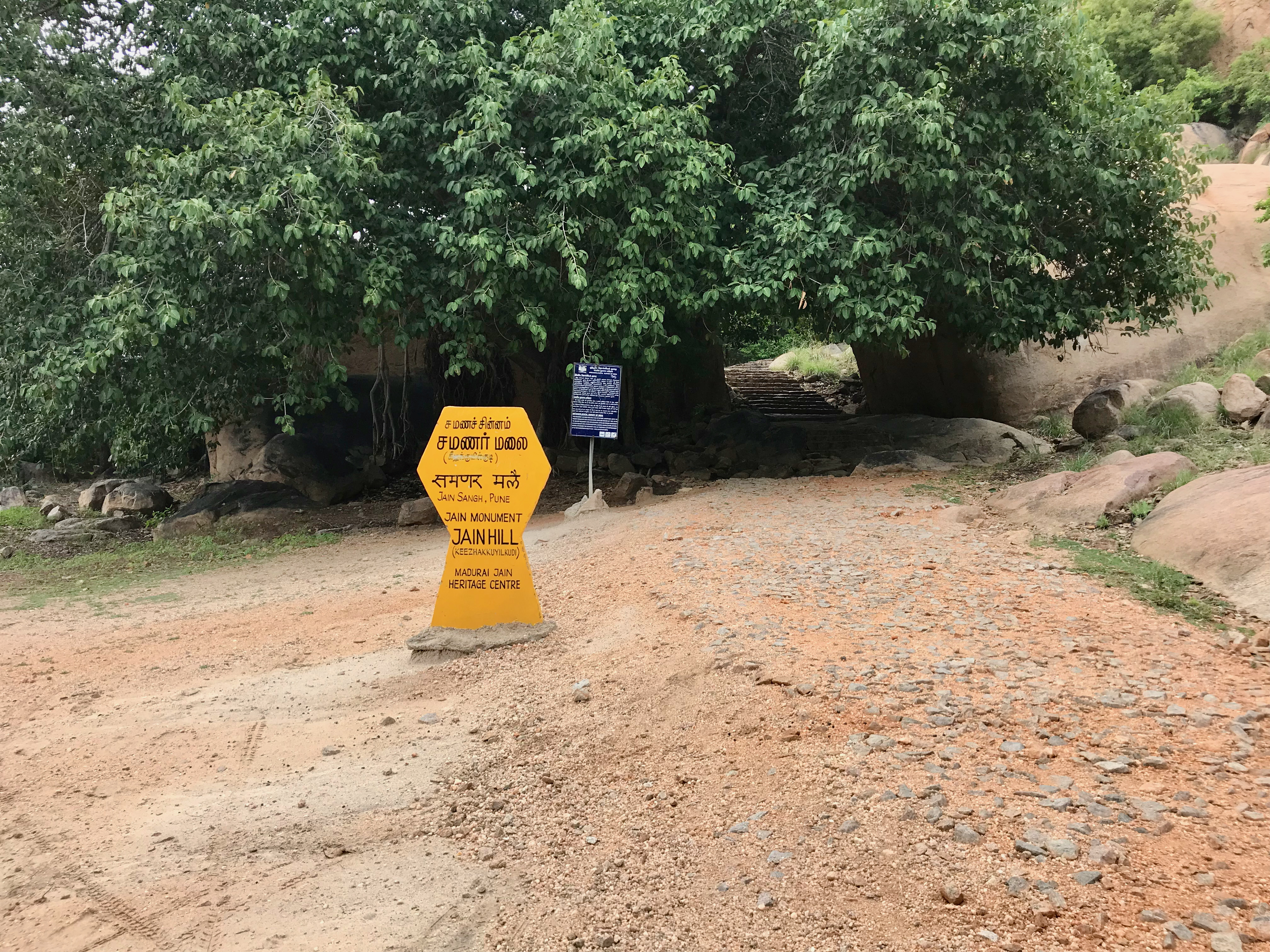
The entrance to the lower Samanar hills Samanar monuments.

The Samanar Hills are located west of Madurai, near the junction of Indian highways NH44 and NH85. The rocky hills begin around the village Kilkuyilkudi and stretch in an easterly direction towards south Madurai. Different parts of these rocky hills are called by different names and are home to a range of monuments dating between 2nd-century BCE and 12th-century CE. The south side of the extreme western end of this rocky hillocks is called the Samanar hills, and these containing a number of Samanar and Hindu monuments. The eastern parts of the same rocky hillocks include other important sites such as the Kanjamalai with the Thiruparankundram Jain cave and Hindu monuments (Umai Andar), the major rock cut Subramaniya Swamy temple (Kandan) and the 17th to 18th-century Islamic dargah for Sikandar Shah – the last Sultan of the Madurai Sultanate (1372–1377 CE). The Samanar hills contain many Jain and some Hindu monuments and inscriptions at several levels.

Samanar is derived from Sanskrit word Sramana, colloquially denoting any ascetic tradition. In contemporary Tamil Nadu, the word is equated with the Jain tradition. In Tamil language, malai means 'hill'. Thus Samanar malai denotes a "Jain hill". The hill was also known as Melmalai (hills to the west), Amanarmalai (derived from Samanarmalai). In some Tamil texts, a Jain site named Thiruvuruvakam is mentioned, which scholars suggest is same as Samanar Hills.

According to Mahajan, it was the 8th-century Jain scholar Akalanka who founded Samanar Hills and nearby Madurai Jain basadis (settlements) after vanquishing the Buddhist scholars at Kanchipuram. This led to Jains flourishing here between the 9th and 12-century, along with the establishment of a monastery.

The Samanar hills have two significant collection of Jain monuments. On the southwestern slope tip is the Settipodavu with a 10th-century Jain cave (povadu from pudai, means cave). Settipodavu is a short climb up from the base. On the southeastern slope is the Pechchipallam site at a higher level. The Pechchipallam is on the other side of the hills than Settipodavu, and they too contain Jaina reliefs and inscriptions. The Pechchipallam carvings and inscriptions are mostly from the 10th century, a few from the late 9th century and a few after the 10th century. A few Tamil-Brahmi inscriptions have also been found at the top of the Samanar hills, but their translation is a secular language, and does not imply a definite connection with Buddhism, Jainism or Hinduism. Near the base and at the top of the Samanar hills are the damaged and then restored Karuppu Sami temple and a ruined Koyil dedicated to Vishnu whose jagati (base platform) only survives. These were probably one of the many victims of the religious demolitions and wars in the Thiruparankundram area in the 14th-century, given Thiruparankundram-Madurai were among sites targeted for raids and looting by the Delhi Sultanate, and thereafter served as the capital of Madurai Sultanate.

== Description ==
The Settipodavu site on the Samanar hills is more easily accessible and oft visited. It is a small cave on the southwestern tip of these hillocks, on the western slope. The cave is a natural one. As one walks towards the cave, into the view comes a large seated Tirthankara relief. A closer look below his asana affirms the lion emblem, suggesting that the image is of Mahavira. Below him is a 10th-century Tamil inscription in a rounded script (Vatteluttu), whose shape and style helps date the image. Inside the cave are three Tirthankaras in the middle. To the left is the Jaina goddess Ambika Devi depicted as a female warrior riding a lion with a drawn bow and arrow in her hands. To the right of the three Tirthankaras is a seated and larger Padmavati Devi. Smaller characters accompany Ambika Devi on elephant and foot. Below these reliefs are three inscriptions, all in Tamil language, Vatteluttu script and all from the 10th century.

Settipodavu
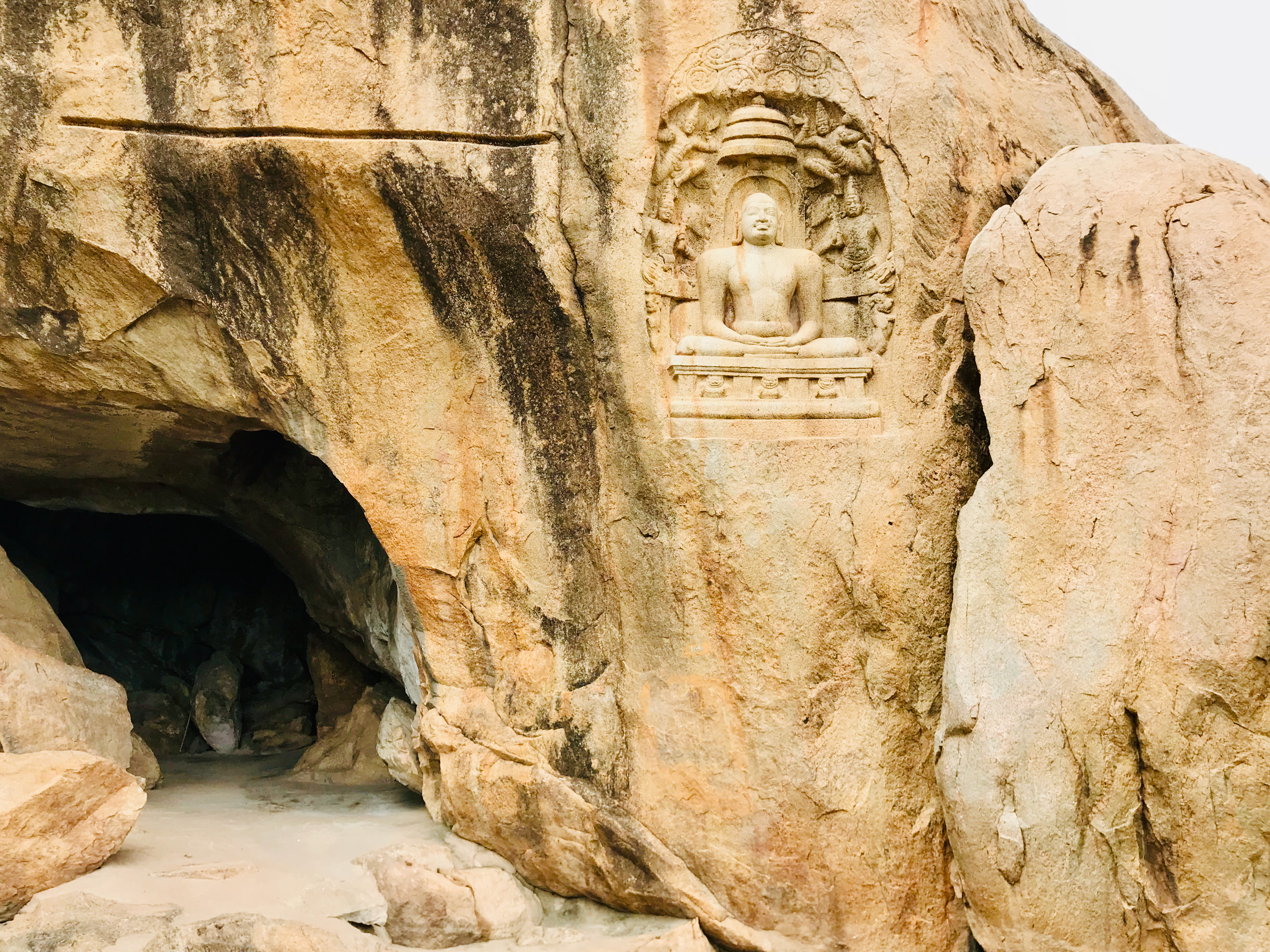
Approaching Settipodavu, Mahavira

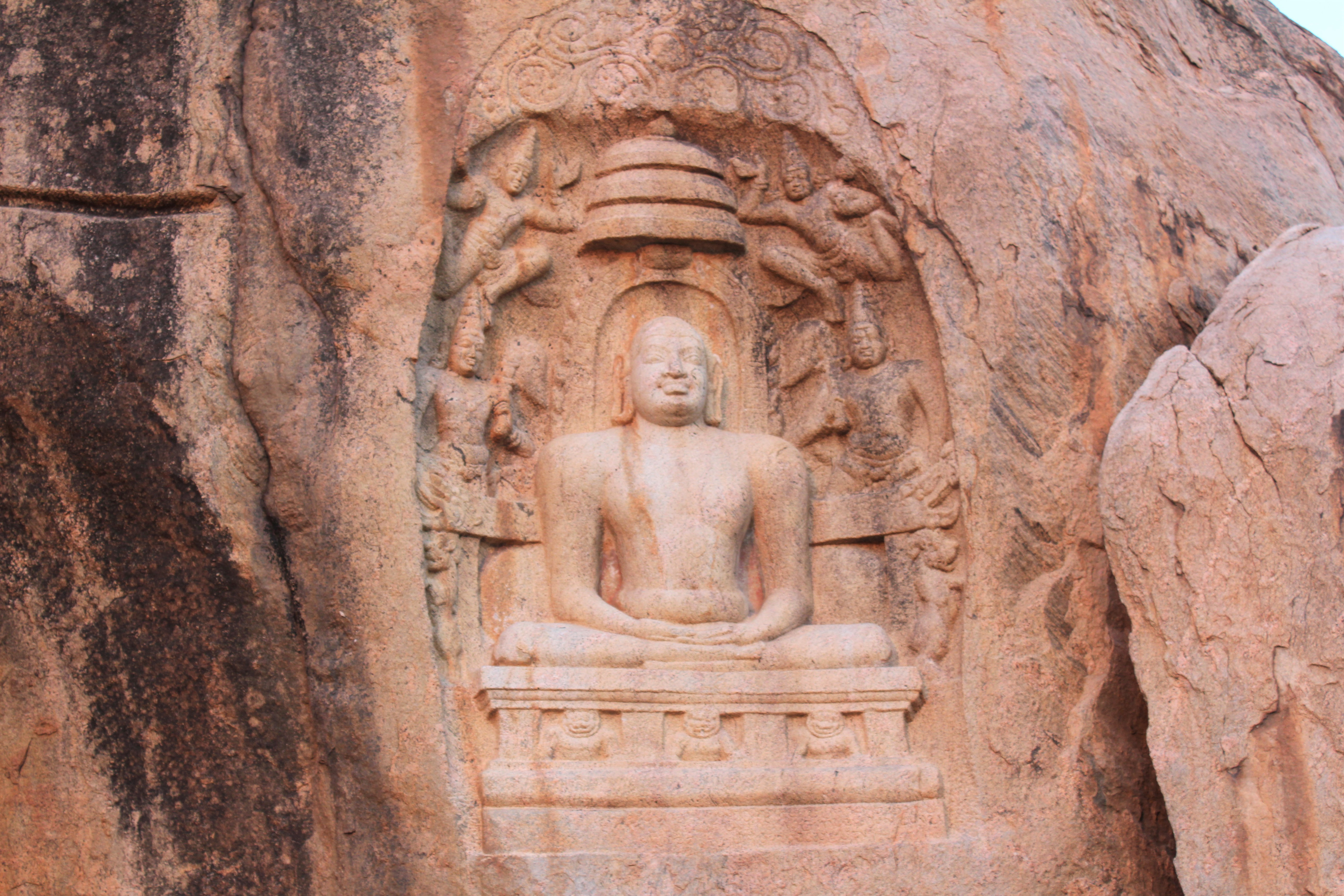
Mahavira closeup

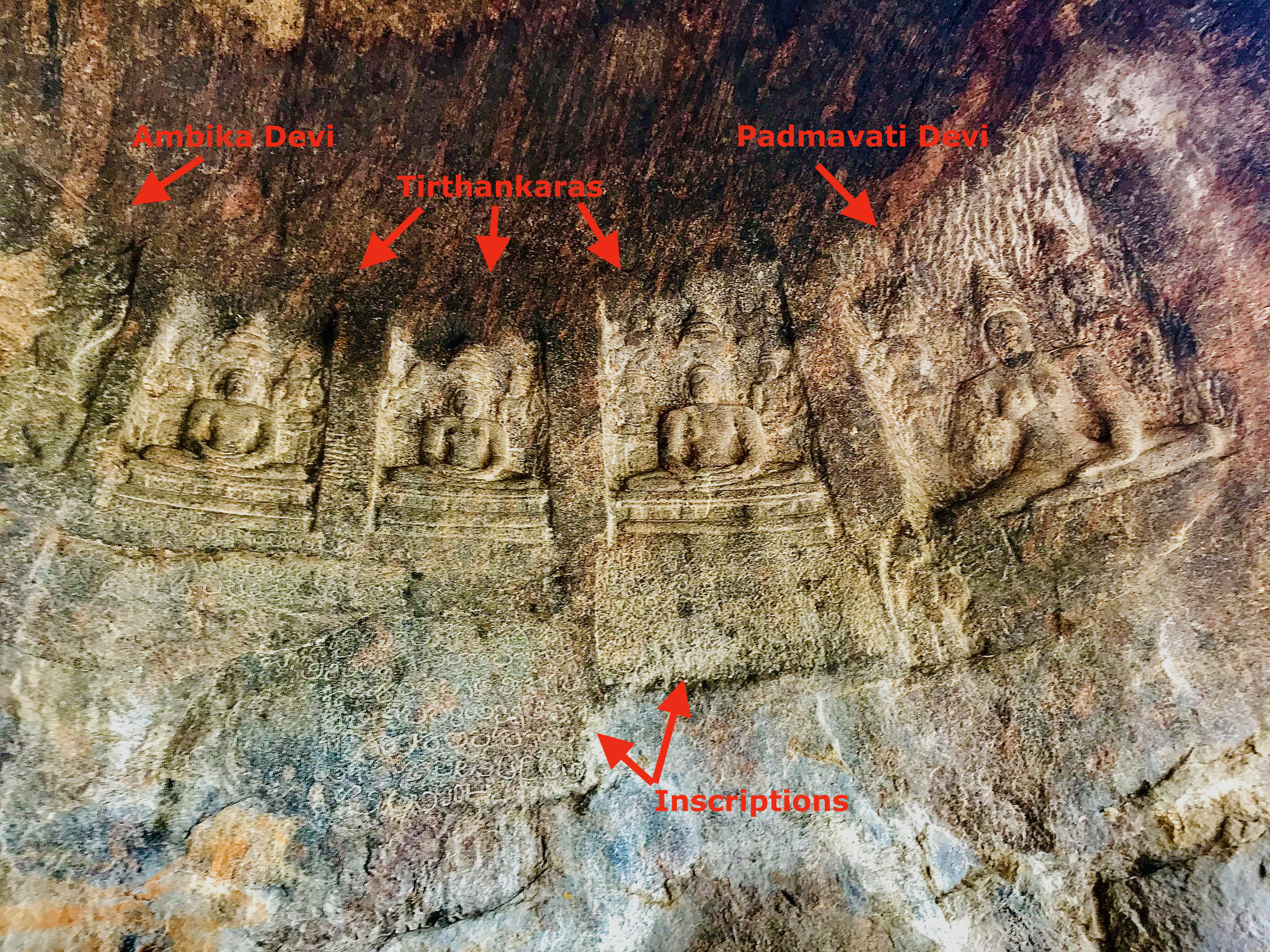
Reliefs in the Jain cave

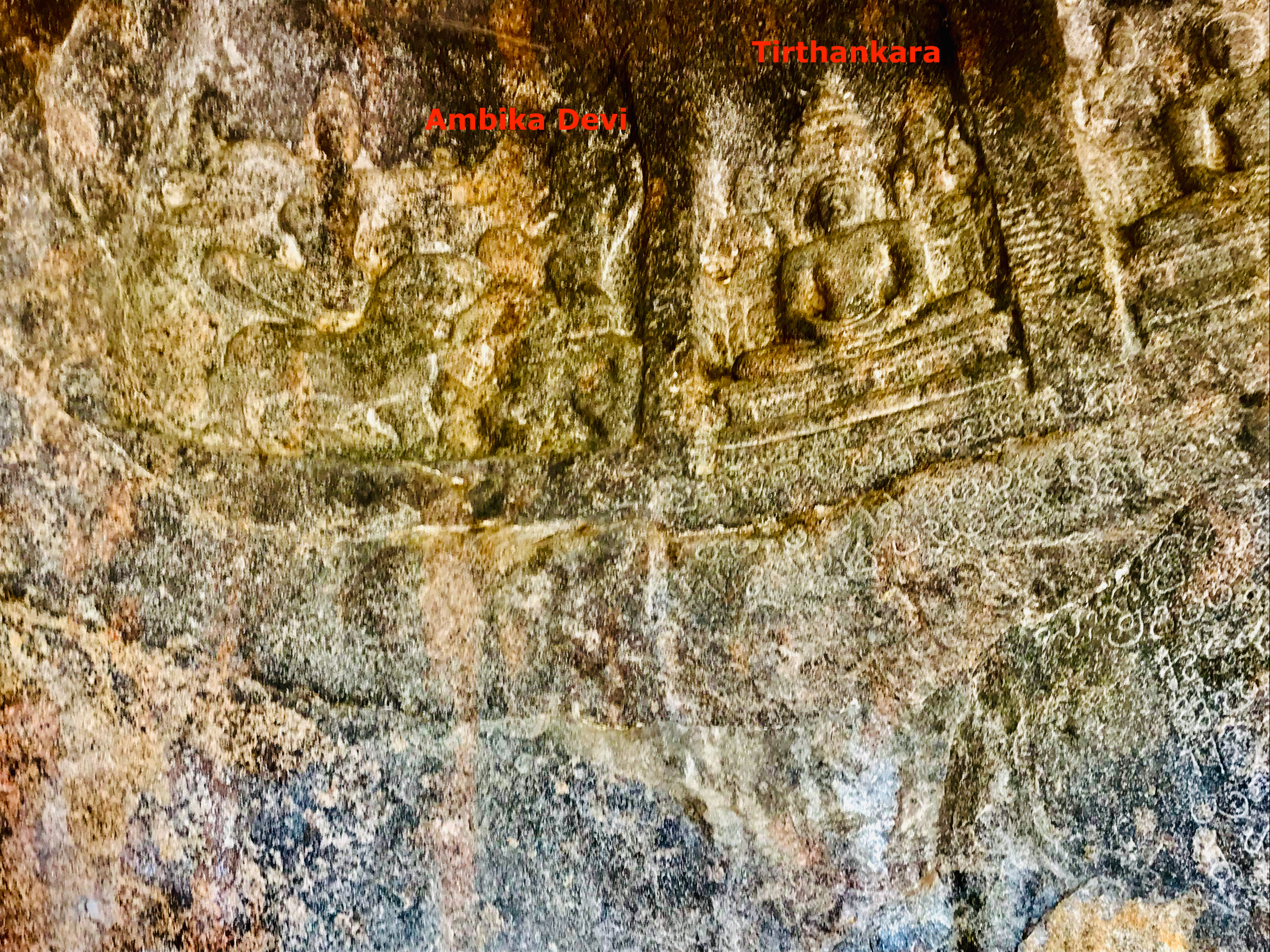
Close up of Ambika Devi in Durga-like warrior posture

The Pechchipallam site is on the eastern slope, the other side of the Samanar hills yet relatively close to Settipodavu. As one approaches the Pechchipallam site, a row of eight Jaina reliefs come into view. Four are of Parsvanatha with serpent hood, one is of Bahubali, and remaining three of other Tirthankaras. In one of these, the Jain yaksha Dharanendra is notable for its relatively rare iconography. He is shown as half snake and half human as he holds the chamaras above the head of Parvanatha. A similar iconography is found near Kalugumalai Jain Beds.

Below these eight reliefs at the Pechchipallam site are six Tamil inscriptions in Vatteluttu script from donors. These help date them between the 9th and 10th century, with two possibly from the late 8th century CE. Thus, the Pechchipallam site had become popular to wealthy patrons supporting Jaina ascetics by about the 9th century. Further up from the Pechchippalam reliefs is a temple site whose jagati has survived. There is a 10th-century inscription there. At the top of the Samanar hills is a solitary stone lamp post. Not too far from the foot this post is an 11th-century or more likely 12th-century predominantly Kannada inscription with one line in Tamil. This is also a Jaina inscription. Taken together with many more 11th- to 13th-century Jaina inscriptions found in Madurai area, other regions of Tamil Nadu and Karnataka, this Kannada inscription at Samanar hills top confirms a thriving Jaina tradition in Madurai area through the 14th century and an active interaction between Digambara Jain sites in Karnataka and those in Tamil Nadu.

Pechchipallam
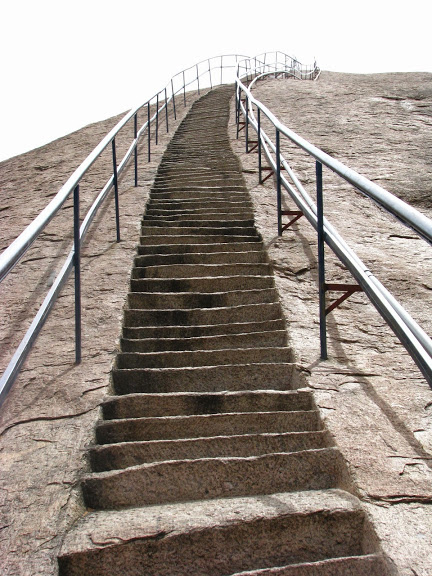
Stairs to the site

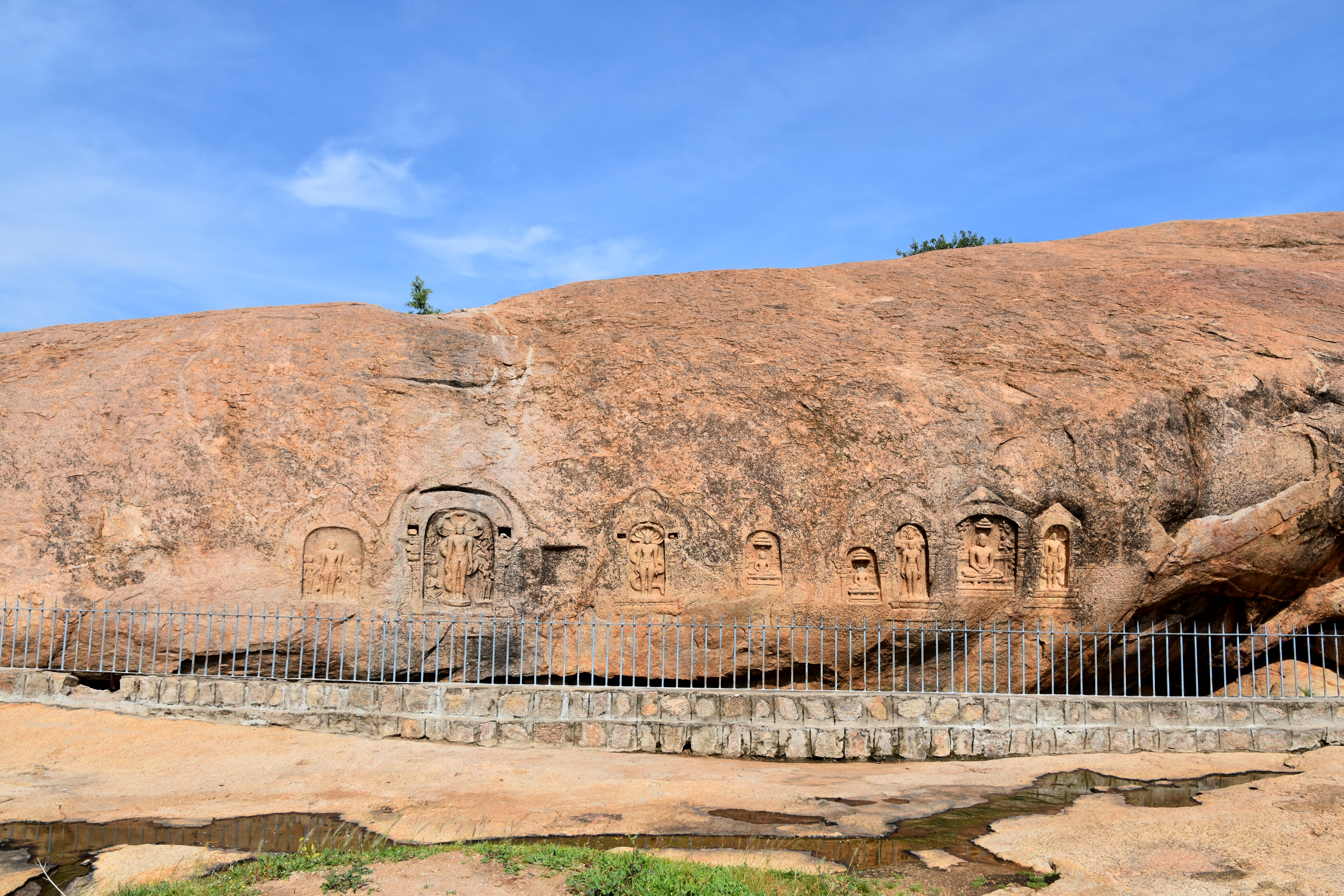
Approaching Pechchipallam

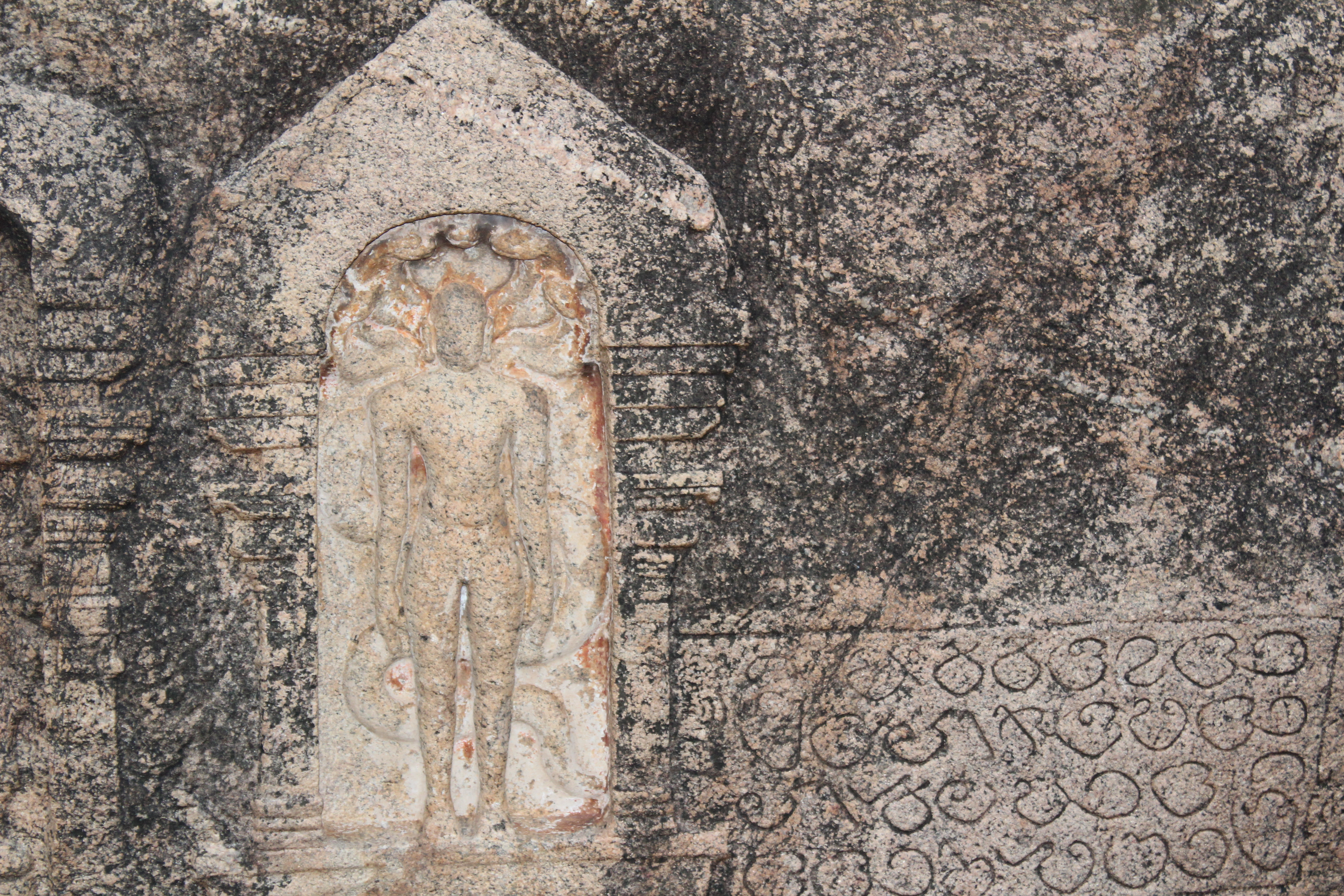
Parsvanatha with serpent hood, inscription on the right

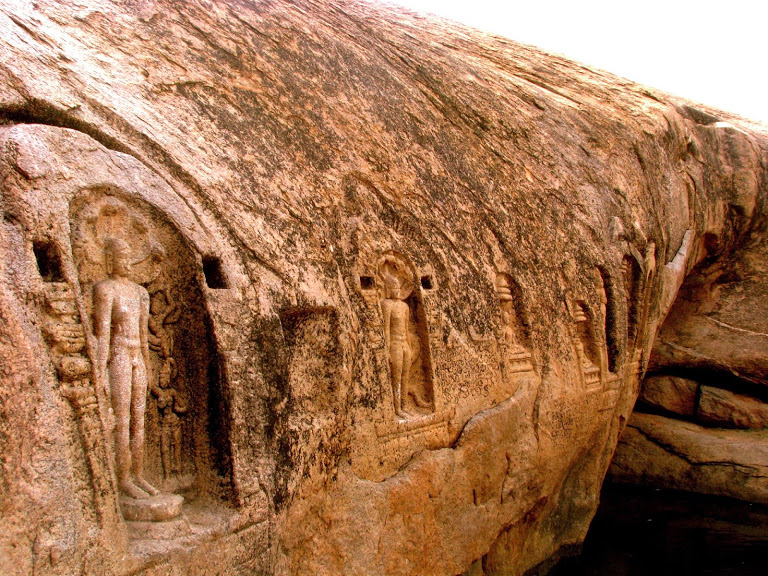
Reliefs of Tirthankaras

The Samanar hills also had 12 stone beds, used by the monks to take rest. However, these were damaged when nearby quarrying for rocks and rains caused a collapse of the covering stone of the cavern.

In the foothills, there is an Ayyanar Karuppanasamy temple and a lotus pond. The temple is dedicated to a rural folk deity – Karuppu Sami. Tamil texts mention a Maadevi Perumpalli, a monastery here. The kings from the Pandyan Dynasty, who ruled Madurai, visited this monastery.

=== Inscriptions ===
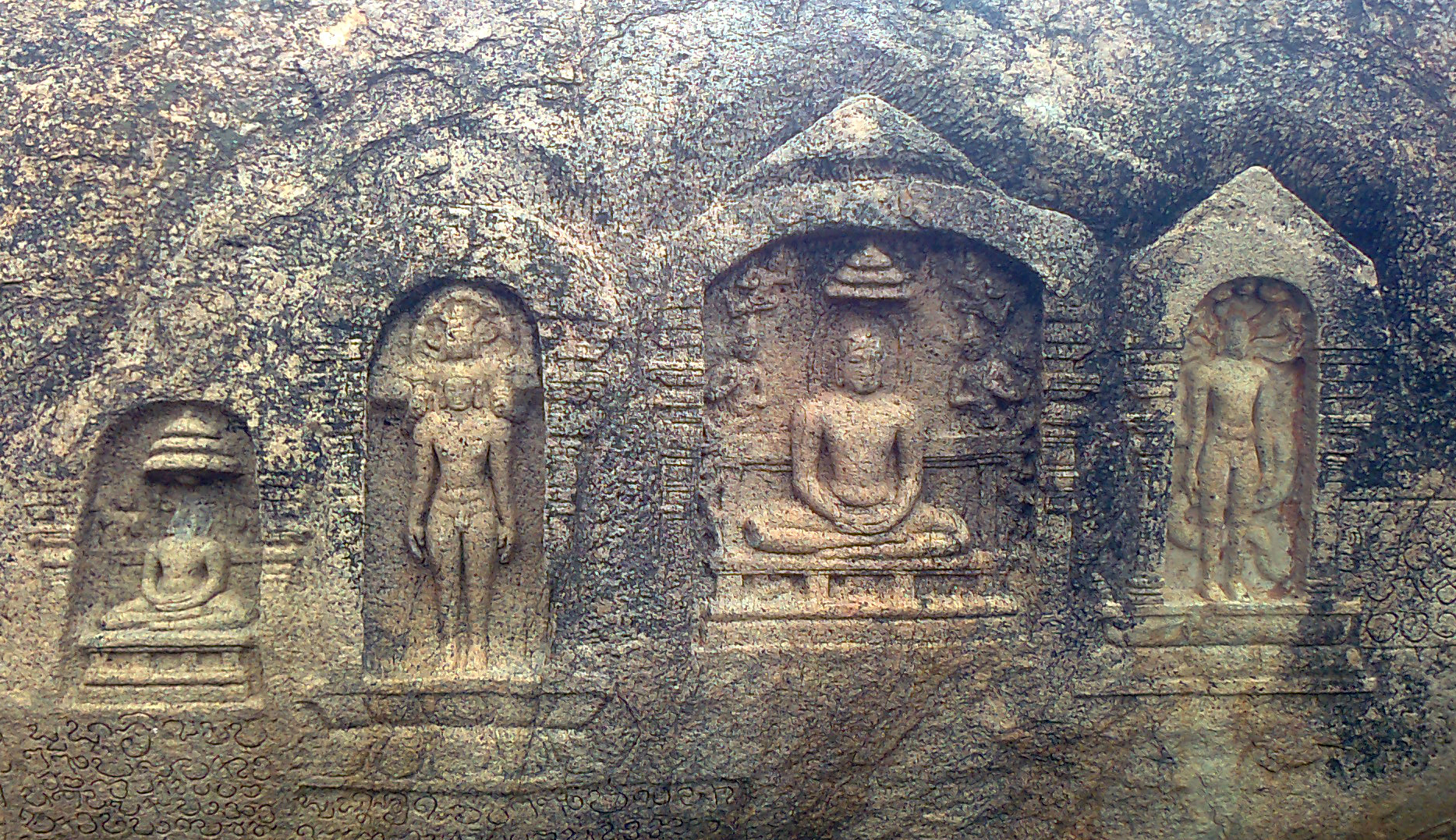
Reliefs of Tirthankaras, Pecchippallam

Samanar Malai has several very old Tamil-Brahmi inscriptions, likely the early centuries of the common era.

Several of the inscriptions in the cave at Settipodavu site, all from the 10th-century, mention that a disciple of Gunasena Deva "caused this holy image to be made" and that Gunasena Deva was the head of "this palli" (monastery), or in the honor of their mentor who in turn was the disciple of Gunasena Deva. Thus these records imply the significance of Gunasena Deva around 10th-century, and that a Jain monastery existed near the contemporary Keelakuyilkudi village. The donor names include Vardhamana Panditar, Deyvabaladeva and Andalaiyan. On the other side at the Pechchipallam site, again Gunasena Deva and the monastery he runs are mentioned. Additionally, a mother and relatives of Jain ascetics are the donors, as they declare their relationships in the inscription. One of the inscriptions call the Tirthankara image as "Devar". Other tentative Jaina ascetics mentioned in the interpolated versions of the inscriptions at Samanar hills are Chandraprabha, Balachandradeva, Nemideva, Ajitasenadeva and Govardhanadeva.

The inscription above the Pechipallam Jain reliefs on the foundation of a lost temple are mostly damaged. The remaining characters mention a "protection of Sri parama" and otherwise show no persuasive Jaina connection.

The inscription at the top of the Samanar hill that is predominantly in Kannada is partly eroded and difficult to read, but the characters that have survived and best interpolations suggest that a Jain monk, likely from a Mula sangha died here. That may be an allusion to historic sallekhana ('fast unto death') ritual of the Jains.

== Related sites ==
The tradition of calling historic ascetic sites, particularly of Jaina tradition with the prefix Samanar is common in many parts of Tamil Nadu. However, these are different sites. For example, another site near the Narthamalai group of rocky hillocks about 18 kilometers north of Pudukkottai is also called "Samanar malai". It is also a historic Jain site, and it too had a Jaina monastery near Bommamalai (Bommadimalai), but that Samanar-malai is a very different site than the one west of Madurai city. About 50 kilometres (31 mi) southwest of Madurai,

Kupalantham Poigaimalai Jain Cave Temple;

there is the Jain site at Poigai malai in the village of Kuppalnatham, temple was locally called in the name of sammanar kovil. The temple is important Jain site of madurai district . It is also a cave with eight Jina bas-reliefs and an inscription, much mentioned in early studies on Jainism in Tamil Nadu.

== Gallery ==
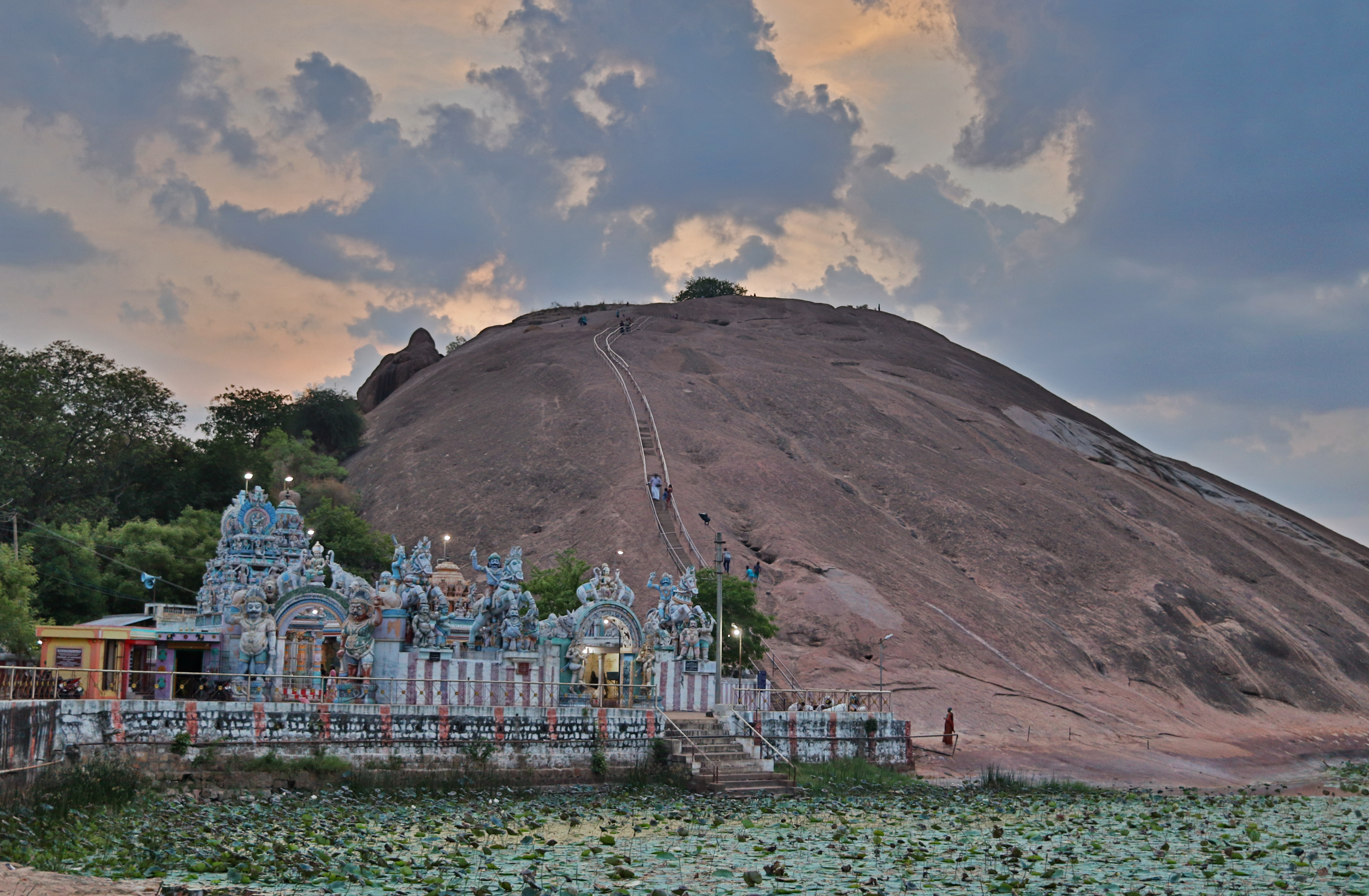
Karuppanasamy temple and lotus pond at the foothills of Samanar Hills

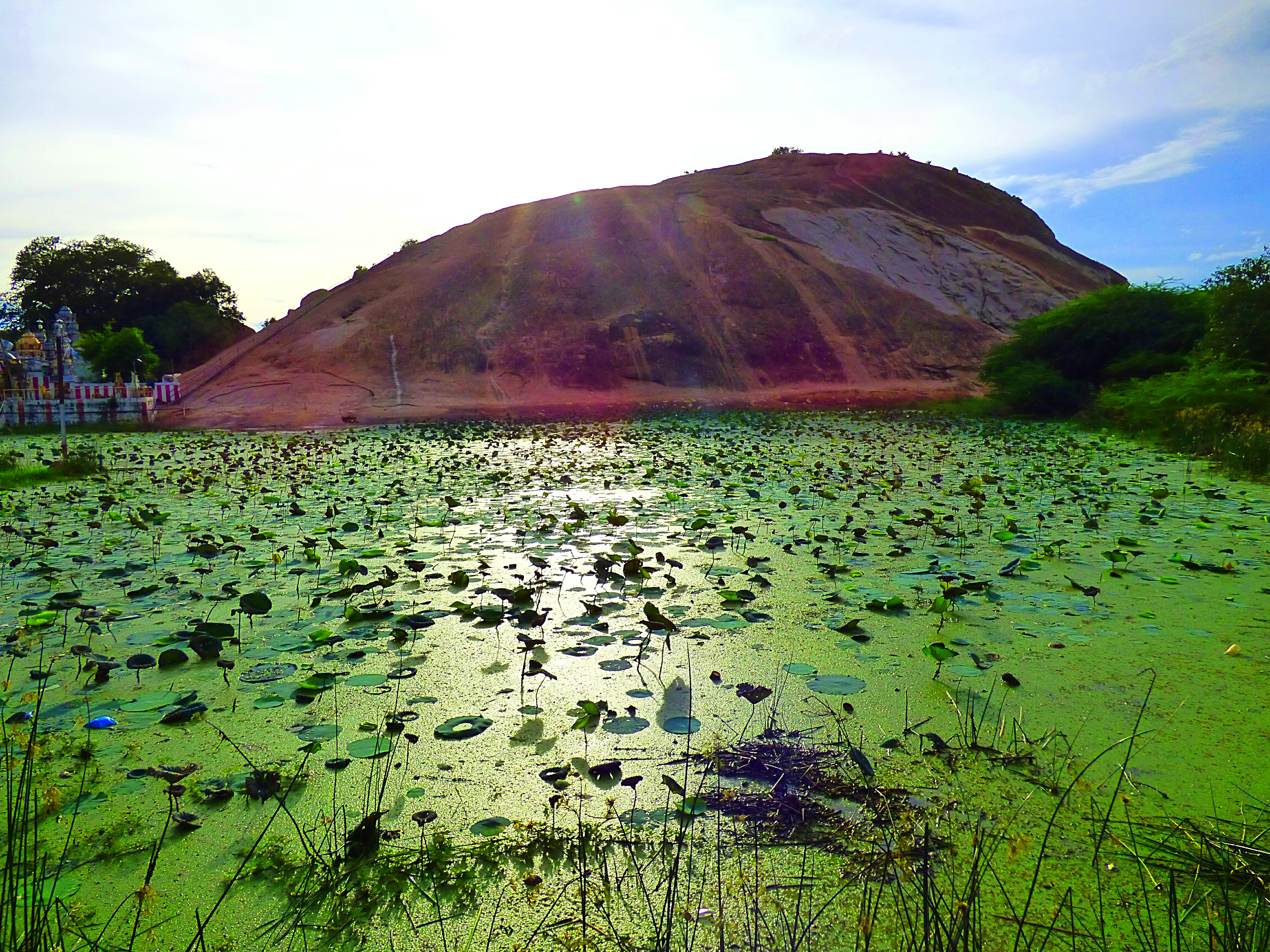
View of lotus pond below from Samanar Hills top
