= Arumbanur =

- town
- Location in Tamil Nadu, India
- Coordinates: 10°00′41″N 78°11′57″E
- Country: India
- State: Tamil Nadu
- District: Madurai
- Taluka: Madurai North

Population (2011)
  - Total: 6,173

Languages
  - Official: Tamil
- Time zone: UTC+5:30 (IST)

Arumbanur is a census town in Madurai-North, Madurai district in the state of Tamil Nadu, India. It is 4.5 by road northeast of the village of Kadachanendal.

== Demographics ==
At the 2001 India census, Arumbanur had a population of 1,506. Males, 767, constituted 51% of the population and females, 739, constituted 49%.

In the 2011 census the population of Arumbanur was 6,173.

== Politics ==
It is part of the Madurai (Lok Sabha constituency). S. Venkatesan also known as Su. Venkatesan from CPI(M) is the Member of Parliament, Lok Sabha, after his election in the 2019 Indian general election.
