= Devankuruchi =

Devankurichi
- Neighbourhood
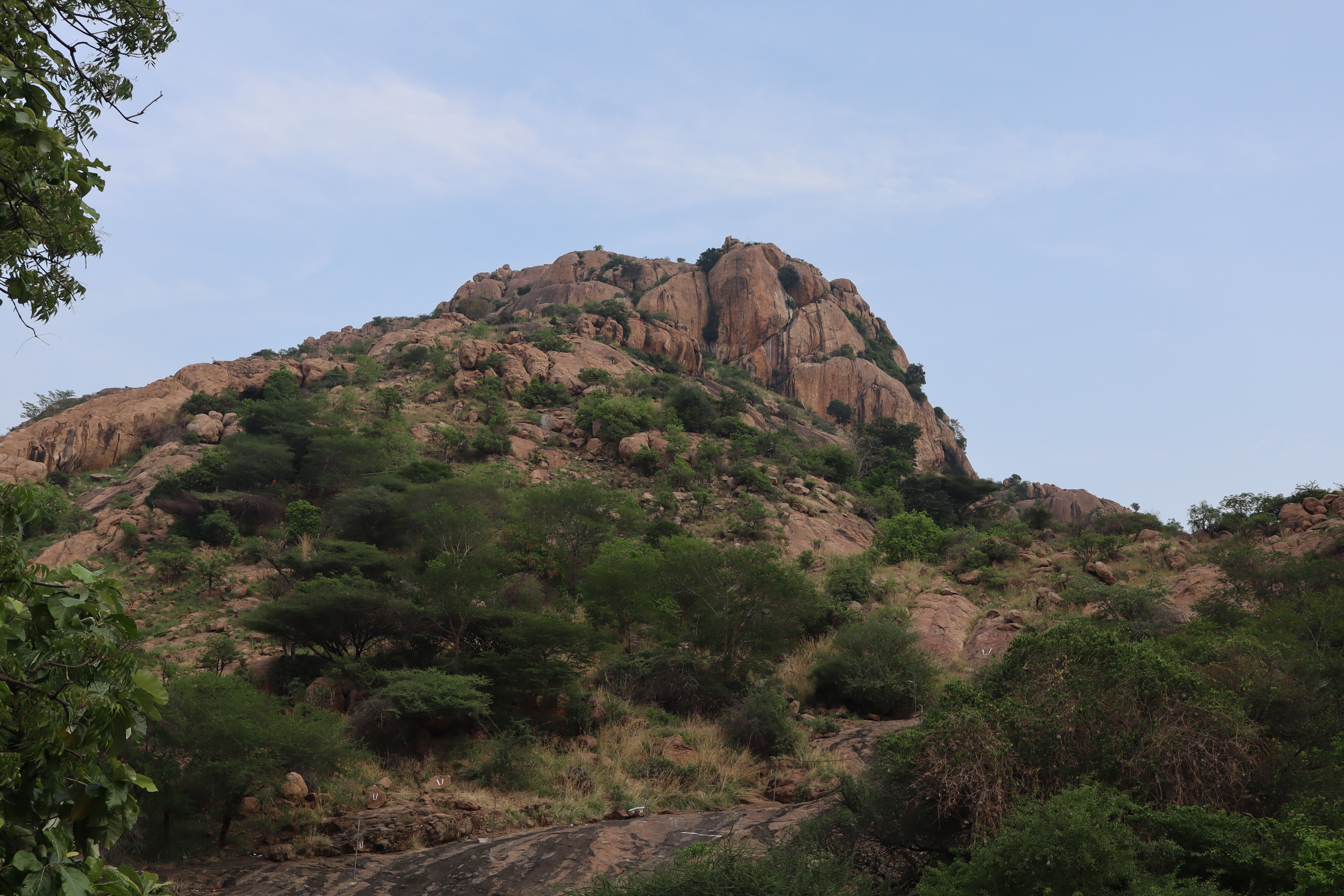
- Peak of Devankuruchi Hill

- Devankurichi, Madurai district, Tamil Nadu
- Coordinates: 9.7262°N 77.8382°E
- Country: India
- State: Tamil Nadu
- District: Madurai
- Elevation: 258.16 m (847.0 ft)

Languages
  - Official: Tamil
  - Speech: Tamil
- Time zone: UTC+5:30 (IST)
- PIN: 625702
- Other Neighbourhoods: T. Kallupatti, Kilangulam

Devankurichi is an archaeology site located near to T.Kallupatti and 40 km far from Madurai, Tamil Nadu, India. Devankurichi is a small village on the road towards Peraiyur. The Devankurichi hill is a symbol of spirituality as one can see it while driving closer to T.Kallupatti. Many people throng the Agneeswaran Temple of Devankurichi for doing the last rites of those who are dead and so its equated to Kasi.

== Archaeological excavation ==
An archaeological excavation in 1976–77, revealed that Devankuruchi was a human habitation even 6,000 years ago. 2,000-year-old black and red wares, stone beads, bangles made of conch shells and burial urns were unearthed during the excavation which prove the existence of megalithic culture. Iron and Chalcolithic age evidences were also found during the excavation. The site continued to be occupied in the early historical period, as attested to by the presence of some copper coins and russet coated white painted ware.

Analysing the habitation site, it was understood that both Jainism and Saivism flourished in the area. ‘Sri Agnieswarar, Gomathi Amman Temple’, the present Siva temple, was constructed during the later Pandya period (12 – 13 CE). Later, it was fully renovated and reconstructed during the Nayak period. Tamil inscriptions belonging to Maravarman Sundara Pandyan (1216 CE -1238 CE) has details about donations made to the temple. Though the Jain temple as ruined, Jain sculptures found around the temple reinstates its presence. At the foothills of Devankuruchi, a Nayak period hero stone was established in remembrance of a hero who was killed while fighting a tiger.
