= V. Ammapatti =

V. Ammapatti is a panchayat village in Madurai district in Tamil Nadu, South India. V stands for vairavi the community people who lived 1000 years ago. It is located between the cities of Thirumangalam and Rajapalayam (Exactly 40 km from Madurai and 20 km from Thirumangalam and 30 km from Rajapalayam. Its nearest town is T.Kallupatti. This village is located on the NH 208 which is connects Madurai to Kollam via Courtalam

== Geography and climate ==
V.Ammapatti is located on Madurai district. The Boundary lines the village of Kottanipatti(East), M.subbulapuram (South), kadaneri (West) and T.Kallupatti (North).

The maximum temperature is approximately 36 °C during April - May months and minimum temperature approximately 22.8 °C during December - January Months.

== Occupation and culture ==
The main occupation of the people is Agriculture. Rice, cotton are the main field crops and coconut, and banana are the important tree crops. The V.Ammapatti Reservoir is the main water source.
