= Madurai South =

Madurai South may refer to:

- Madurai-South taluk
- Madurai South (state assembly constituency)
