= Madurai West =

Madurai West may refer to:

- Madurai West block
- Madurai West (state assembly constituency)
