= Karaikeni =

- Village
- Location in Tamil Nadu, India Karaikeni (India)
- Coordinates: 9.743889°N 77.841389°E
- Country: India
- State: Tamil Nadu
- District: Madurai district

Population (2001)
  - Total: 2,500

Languages
  - Official: Tamil
- Time zone: UTC+5:30 (IST)

Karaikeni is a Gram panchayat in Madurai district in the Indian state of Tamil Nadu.

== Location ==
Karaikeni is situated 2 km from T.Kallupatti. It comprises two villages Karaikeni and Theppathupatti.

== Culture ==
Karaikeni Padukalam (padukalam means "war") is celebrated where many villages come together to have different war like activities. The history goes back 500 years when Karaikeni ruler Arasuthevar decided to resolve a dispute between two other small rulers. The decision was to contest a war to decide the winner. One of the rulers and his army was destroyed but one warrior escapes. His descendants come together every two years to celebrate this festival. Now the festival involves a fight between the groups in typical Tamil tradition involving Silambu. Some of the other temples are Maasana Muthammal (Sleeping Goddess), Amman Temple, Vinayakar Temple, Kochadai Muthiah/ Karupasamy temple.

== Rural development ==
The village has only Hindus and a majority belong to Thevar community. The village is a revenue village and has protected water supply and electricity to all households. Primary health care and high school are available in the village. Major revenue comes from agriculture. More frequent religious festivals contribute to the revenue of locals. The village is linked by Gram Sadak Yojana and is linked with nearby villages and to T. Kallupatti town.

== Politics ==
All India Anna Dravida Munnetra Kazhagam was the favoured political party till Sedapatti Muthiah was in AIADMK as his wife and relatives belong to this village. There is a split support between AIADMK and DMK post his joining hands with DMK.
