= Kannadendal =

- Census town
- Location in Tamil Nadu, India
- Coordinates: 9°59′39″N 78°12′27″E
- Country: India
- State: Tamil Nadu
- District: Madurai

Population (2001)
  - Total: 15,987

Languages
  - Official: Tamil
- Time zone: UTC+5:30 (IST)

Kannadendal is a census town in Madurai district in the Indian state of Tamil Nadu.

== Demographics ==
As of 2001 India census, Kannadendal had a population of 15,987. Males constitute 51% of the population and females 49%. Kannadendal has an average literacy rate of 86%, higher than the national average of 59.5%: male literacy is 90%, and female literacy is 83%. In Kannadendal, 8% of the population is under 6 years of age.

== Politics ==
It is part of the Madurai (Lok Sabha constituency). S. Venkatesan also known as Su. Venkatesan from CPI(M) is the Member of Parliament, Lok Sabha, after his election in the 2019 Indian general election.
