= T. Kallupatti =

- Panchayat town
- Location in Tamil Nadu, India
- Coordinates: 9.75°N 77.89°E
- Country: India
- State: Tamil Nadu
- District: Madurai

Government
  - Chairman: vacant

Population (2011)
  - Total: 10,762

Languages
  - Official: Tamil
- Time zone: UTC+5:30 (IST)
- PIN: 625 702
- Telephone code: 04549
- Sex ratio: 1000-1001 ♂/♀

T. Kallupatti is a panchayat town in the Madurai district in the Indian state of Tamil Nadu.

== Etymology ==
The town has an initial similar to that of a person. Initials in the name, is a common feature of towns in Southern Tamil Nadu. The initial for Kallupatti comes from the name of the mother village from which it derives its existence. The form is similar to that between a mother and her children, a convention which was a feature of the original Tamil culture for years. T. Kallupatti's mother village is Devankuruchi (spelled as Thevankurichi), a small village on the road towards Peraiyur. The Devankurichi hill is a symbol of spirituality, one which is visible while driving near to T. Kallupatti. Many people throng to the Agneeswaran Temple of Devankurichi in order to perform the last rites of those who are dead and so it is equated to Kasi.

== History ==
Archaeological excavations conducted in 1977 by the Archaeological Survey of India in the Upper Gundar Basin discovered Iron Age historical remains in T.Kallupatti. The early history of the region can be dated back to the fifth century A.D. T.Kallupatti and Chinnakattalai are among the few places in South India with Iron Age historical remains of copper and gold. The findings of the investigation were reported by the Journal for South Asian Studies. The region also features in the book Distinctive Beads in Ancient India.

== Geography ==
T.Kallupatti is at the crossroads of the highways connecting Madurai to Rajapalayam, and Virudhunagar to Theni. Due to this, it is considered a rural hub. The Western Ghats reach to the western, northeastern and southwestern sides of the town. Due to its proximity to the Western Ghats, the town has a cooler average temperature than that of the city of Madurai and other eastern areas.

== Demographics ==
According to the 2011 Indian census, T.Kallupatti had a population of 10,762. Males constituted 51% of population and females 49%. Then, T.Kallupatti had an average literacy rate of 70%, higher than the national average of 59.5%. Male literacy was 75% and female literacy was 64%. By 2019, the literacy rate had increased to 86.5%. In T.Kallupatti, 11% of the population was under six years of age in 2011. At 25,000, the floating population is high for a rural town.

=== Languages ===
- Tamil

Tamil is spoken commonly everywhere here.

== Politics ==
T.Kallupati comes under the Tirumangalam (State Assembly Constituency) (Madurai). The parliamentary constituency is that of the Virudhunagar (Lok Sabha constituency). T.Kallupatti also has Seva Groups for each community. These include Perarasar Perumbidugu Mutharaiyar Sangam, Ambalakarar Peravai, Karana Maravar Seva Sangam, All Telugu Sangam and branches of AITUC.

Current Representations:

- TN Legislative Assembly - R.B. Udhayakumar of the All India Anna Dravida Munnetra Kazhagam - Thirumangalam Constituency.
- Member of Parliament - B.Manickam Tagore Congress - Virudhunagar (Lok Sabha constituency).

== Public administration ==
The T.Kallupatti Block comprises about 42 Villages and is one of the more effectively administered rural blocks of the state. There is 100% electricity coverage in all villages. Protected Water Supply is available in all villages under the Block. The Male to Female Ratio is 1000–1001, which shows a major shift from Usilampatti Block (just 20 km away) where female infanticide is high. Forty-four per cent of women are employed, which constitutes a diverse workforce. Sixty-five per cent depend on agriculture. MicroFinance and illegal money lending are uncommon in the Block as there are 15 Agriculture Cooperative Banks. All 42 Villages are Panchayats and 39 of the 42 are Revenue Villages. There are 88 Child Welfare Centres with most of them concentrated in the town of T.Kallupatti and these are well connected by village roads. Although Peraiyur is the Taluk, the Central Location of T.Kallupatti and its being on the NH 208 provided it with an advantage in development and so Peraiyur comes under the T.Kallupatti block as a revenue firka.

=== T.Kallupatti Block ===
Density of population per km^{2}	319
Percentage of urban population to total Population	22.69
Number of females per 1000 males	1001
Percentage of workers to total population	51.12
Percentage of female workers to total workers	44.24
Percentage of agricultural workers to total workers	67.46
Percentage of gross cropped area to net area sown	99.54
Bovine population per km^{2}	50.23
Percentage of villages electrified	100%
Percentage of villages covered by prot. water supply	100%
No. of police stations	3
No. of noon meal centres	88

=== Police station ===
T.Kallupatti police stations are present in mother villages and in hamlets under each mother village. There are 15 mother villages.

== Facilities ==
Town Panchayat community center

=== Healthcare ===
There are many private hospitals at Kallupatti along with a Government primary health centre. The major hospitals are the Semanthi Clinic run by (Dr. J.Mahendra Varman), Srinivas clinic (run by Dr R.Muthukrishnan), the Sugam clinic run by Dr Thanga Ram, the Seva clinic, the Jeyam nursing home, the Lakshmi clinic, the Vanaraj clinic and the Suga Nivas clinic of Kallikudi road run by Dr Geetha. An NGO called the Nagar Nala Committee operates in the town, providing a Free Eye Camp on the last Saturday of every month in association with Aravindh Eye Hospital Madurai. This is organised by its secretary, Thiru. N. Rajagopal Ayya. By 2016, the organisation had completed more than 200 camps.

=== Electricity ===
T.Kallupatti has a substation of TNEB which supplies electricity to the town and nearby villages. The capacity of this plant was upgraded in 2010.

=== Sustainable development ===
At T. Kallupatti, 35 street lights, seven sodium vapour lamps at a bus stand, and a motor pumpset of 7.5 horsepower used for an overhead tank are powered by a biomass gasifier unit. The unit of 12 KVA (kilovolt ampere) generates 220 units a day at a mere Rs.500. The bus stand and a nearby park are lit up round the clock, even in times of load shedding.

==== Biomass power generation method ====
The unit is fuelled completely by Julia Flora, a plant known as Seemakaruvellai (Thorny tree). A feasibility study for the project showed that the plant was available in abundance in the locality. This was critical to ensure the long-term sustainability of the project. Self-help groups supply the wood, which is dried in the sun for 10 days and then chopped into pieces. The progress of the unit is closely monitored. The advantages of biomass power generation method include:

- Reduction in the emission of carbon and in soil erosion.
- Provision of a means of restoring degraded land.
- Reuse of residues from the raw materials of wood, bagasse, rice husk and other agricultural materials. These can be used to generate heat and electricity for agricultural and industrial processes.
- Short-rotation of wood species, including casuarina, which is used to fuel the biomass units.

By harvesting crop in rotation, a standing plantation of 250 hectares will grow 10,000 tonnes of casuarina, which is sufficient to generate 1 megawatt. A 2,500-hectare casuarina energy plantation could support a plant of 10-12 MW.

== Economy ==
Agriculture is the highest grossing industry in and around T.Kallupatti. Cucumber cultivation yields the most revenue along with other seasonal crops. Cucumber sales can be seen when vehicles cross the town and stop near the Bus Station.

Cotton is a major crop here due to the presence of extensive black cotton soil. This has contributed to the rise of more textile industries in the area. Rice is cultivated in the western side of the town and the block. Due to the presence of black soil there is also a high level of Groundnut cultivation.

=== The Institute for Village Industries ===
The Dr. J.C. Kumarappa Institute of Rural Technology and Development at T. Kallupatti (an institutional training centre of the Khadi and Village Industries Commission (KVIC)), provided training in a variety of skills. It offer: six-months training in footwear and leather goods manufacturing; five-months training in tailoring and embroidery; four-months training in the servicing of electronics and electrical appliances; three-months training in welding and fabrication, fancy leather and resin-goods making, motor winding, cutting and tailoring; two-months training in exercise book manufacturing, toilet and laundry soap making, handmade paper conversion (notebooks, file, cover, carry bag, etc.) and fruit and vegetable processing; one-month training in spices and masala making, detergent cake making; two-week training in screen printing; week-long training in cleaning powder making, detergent powder, fruit jam, squash and pickle-making, and four-day training in bio manure and vermin-compost. From 2011, this institute was closed by the administration of the Gandhi Niketan ashram.

=== Recent industrialisation ===
T.Kallupatti is at the centre of the Madurai-Rajapalayam belt of textile industries. These textile mills arose because of the extremely rich black soil deposits in and around Kallupatti, which favours cotton cultivation in large volumes. Textile industries (weaving mills, spinning mills, dyeing units), handlooms, handicrafts and factories have grown around T.Kallupatti, leading to a large number of jobs for men and women. This is due to the cheap labour around the town. Textile mills from Rajapalayam have opened their units in the vicinity. The subsequent availability of jobs for women accounts for more than 40% jobs for women, with the Chennai-based ROPE Enterprises pvt ltd company providing handicrafts and handloom products training and job opportunities for women. Rope created huge potential in women employment.

Major employers include:

- Vee Bee Textile Mills
- Small-Scale Industrial units in Gandhi Niketan, including leather factories.
- Khadi Units.
- M/s. Rope Enterprises (p) Ltd.
- M/s. Rope Artisans and crafts foundation.

=== Banking ===
- Indian Overseas Bank: the T.Kallupatti branch covers most of the customers and nearby villages.
- State Bank of India: a T.Kallupatti branch
- Canara Bank: a T.Kallupatti branch

- 15 Primary Agricultural Co-operative Banks.
- 2 Scheduled Banks
- 5 Nationalised Banks

=== Rural industrial service centre ===
The Khadi and Village Industries Commission has a rural industrial service centre here. There are only three centres like this. The other two centres are in Chennai and Madurai. The cells guide budding entrepreneurs to set up industries in rural areas. This free service gives a boost to the rural employment-generation programme of the KVIC .

== Culture ==
Karaikeni is a small village where the Padukalam is celebrated by many villages coming together to have different war-like activities. The history of this practice goes back over five hundred years to when the Karaikeni ruler Arasuthevar decided to resolve a dispute between two other small rulers. His decision was that there should be a military contest to decide the winner. One of the rulers and his army was destroyed but one warrior escaped. His descendants come together every two years to celebrate this festival. Now the festival involves a fight between groups dressed in typical, traditional Tamil garb, which includes the Silambu.

=== Landmarks ===
Notable locations within this historical place include Eazhoor (seven villages); the Muthalamman Temple; the Devankurichi Temple; the Gandhi Niketan Ashram; the Rural Extension Training Centre (RETC) and the District Institutions of Education and Training (called the teacher-training school), along with government hospitals, etc.

== Transport ==
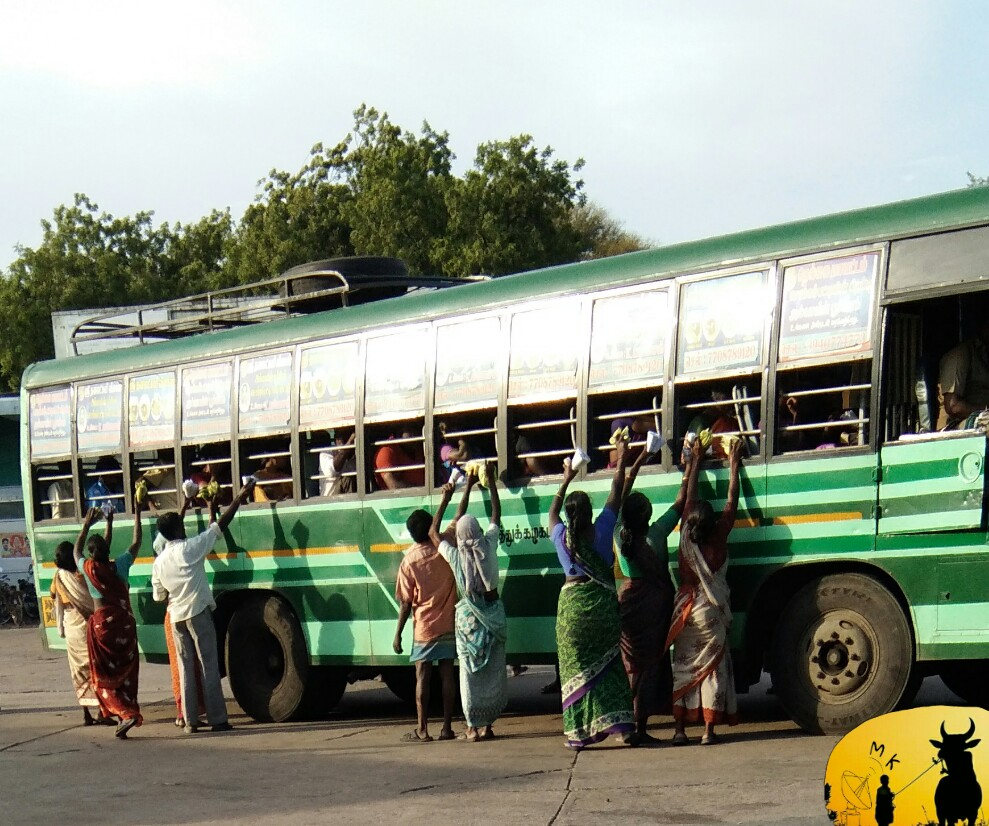

=== By road ===
The town is well connected by National Highway 208 (India) as far as Thirumangalam where it joins with National Highway 7 (India) to Madurai in the North. The NH208 runs via Rajapalayam until it reaches Kollam (Kerala) in the south. All buses to Rajapalayam and Tenkasi run through the town and it is the route for Srivilliputhur, Courtallam, Ayyappa Temple in Pamba and southern Kerala Towns including Trivandrum via Shencottah.

=== By rail ===
The nearest Railway Stations are Kalligudi (13.64 km&8.48 mile), Thirumangalam (18 km) and Virudhunagar (27 km).

== Education ==
T. Kallupatti comes under the Usilampatti Educational District.

== Education ==
Kallupatti has a high literacy rate. There are a number of villages surrounding Kallupatti and every village has a government primary school or high school or higher-secondary school. Most of the teachers working in these villages are resident at Kallupatti. Kallupatti is well connected to all these villages by good roads. The government provides a regular bus service from Kallupatti for the schools, so it is easy for the teaching population to go to the village schools in the morning and reach home in the evening.

=== Higher secondary schools ===
- Gandhi Niketan Higher Secondary School. Students wear the traditional Khadi dress and the institution educates almost 80% of the students in the union and villages. The school is part of the ECO CLUB and is evaluated as part of the National Green Corps.
- Govt. Higher Secondary School.
- M.S.R. Matriculation Higher Secondary School, run by Dr.R.Muthukrishnan.
- Lord Venkateshwara Matriculation Higher Secondary School

=== Primary and middle schools ===
- Jaya Nursery English School, started in 1990

=== Colleges ===
- DIET Government Teacher Training College
- MSR Teacher Training Centre
- Sri Nagalakshmi Ammal College of sciences

=== Gandhiniketan Ashram ===
Gandhi Niketan Ashram is one of the few surviving Gandhian Institutions in India, teaching Gandhian thoughts and ideals. It is spread over 40 acres of land.

==== History ====
Gandhi Niketan Ashram, is the brain-child of Freedom fighter G. Venkatachalapathy ("The Architect of Rural Development and Panchayati Raj Movement in Tamil Nadu") and was started in 1940 to help create an independent India and reconstruct the type of rural India envisioned by Mohandas K. Gandhi.

After India attained independence in 1947, the Gandhi Niketan Ashram was involved in areas like community development, panchayati raj, and khadi and village industries. Development officials and activists from all over India were trained here to work at a grassroots level. The Ashram also played a key role in the Bhoodan movement spearheaded by Acharya Vinoba Bhave.

Martin Luther King Jr., the American Nobel Peace Prize laureate and civil rights movement leader, visited the founder of the Madras twice and obtained a first-hand account of the experiences of Venkatachalapathy in organizing Satyagraha and constructive programmes. E. F. Schumacher, one of the founders of the Green Movement in the west and renowned author of the book Small is Beautiful visited the Ashram in 1962 and obtained valuable insights into the areas of appropriate technology for the benefit of the rural poor. Schumacher was later seen as an adviser for the Indian planning commission in the early 1970s.

==== e-Learning ====
An ambitious programme to introduce computer-aided learning and interactive curriculum support in 1,000 rural schools in the country was launched here in 2008. The e-learning/digital content programme was launched by former President A P J Abdul Kalam at the Gandhi Niketan Ashram School. The initiative helps students clarify their doubts while sitting in their class. Schools are given the infrastructure required for IT-based education which includes animation and interactive tools for various projects at the high/higher secondary school level.

== Notable people ==
A prominent leader from this region is R. Muthiah. From 1991 to 1996, R. Muthiah was the Former Tamil Nadu Assembly Speaker while part of the All India Anna Dravida Munnetra Kazhagam (AIADMK). He was also the Union Minister for Surface Transport in the NDA Government led by A.B. Vajpayee. He later joined Dravida Munnetra Kazhagam (DMK). Mr. Muthiah was elected for Sedappatti as a Member of Legislative Assembly for five terms.
