= Peraiyur taluk =

Peraiyur taluk is a taluk of Madurai district of the Indian state of Tamil Nadu. The headquarters of the taluk is the town of Peraiyur. It's included villages like Sedapatti, chinnakatlai, kuppalnatham, athigaripatti etc.

== Demographics ==
According to the 2011 census, the taluk of Peraiyur had a population of 200,599 with 100,508 males and 100,091 females. There were 996 women for every 1,000 men. The taluk had a literacy rate of 35.47%. Child population in the age group below 6 years were 9,406 Males and 8,727 Females.
