= Sri Vengdajalpathi Perumal Temple Kuppalnatham =

Temple in India

Sri vengdajalpathi perumal Kovil kuppalnatham
- குப்பல்நத்தம் ஸ்ரீ வெங்கடாஜலபதி பெருமாள் கோவில்
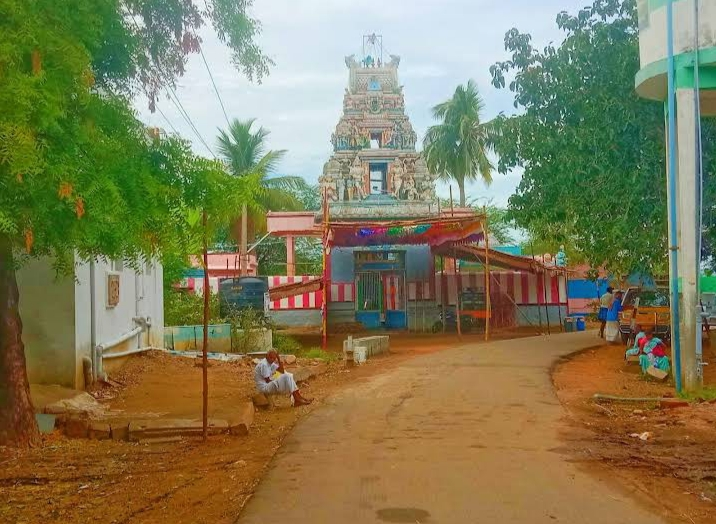

Religion
- Affiliation: Hinduism
- District: Madurai
- Province: Peraiyur
- Deity: vengdajalpathi perumal (visnu)
- Festivals: Chithirai thiruvilla, vaikuta ekathesi
- Governing body: Hindu Religious and Charitable Endowments Department
- Features: Tower: Dravidian architecture; Temple tank: Perumal Kovil lake (ஊரணி)

Location
- Location: Kuppalnatham
- State: Tamil Nadu
- Country: India

Architecture
- Type: Dravidian architecture
- Creator: Madurai Nayak Dynasty
- Established: 400 years ago

Specifications
- Direction of façade: North
- Inscriptions: 2
- Materials: Stone

Sri Vengdajalpathi Perumal Temple is located in Kuppalnatham Village, Peraiyur taluk, Madurai District, Tamil Nadu, India. The temple is 400 years old and was built in the period of Madurai Nayak Dynasty. It houses the shrines of Vengdajalpathi, Arulmigu Sridevi and Bhudevi.

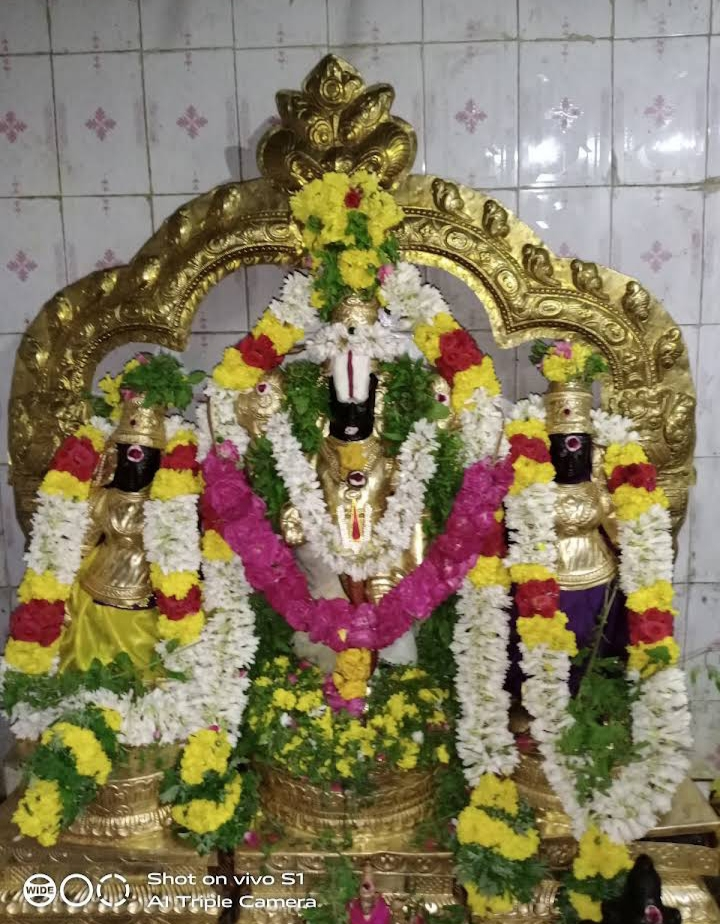
Kuppalnatham Sri vengdajalpathi perumal temple

The temple is classified as a principal temple under the control of the Hindu Charities Department. Proceedings are administered by the Administrator pending litigation.

== Festival ==
kuppalnatham Chithirai thiruvilla:

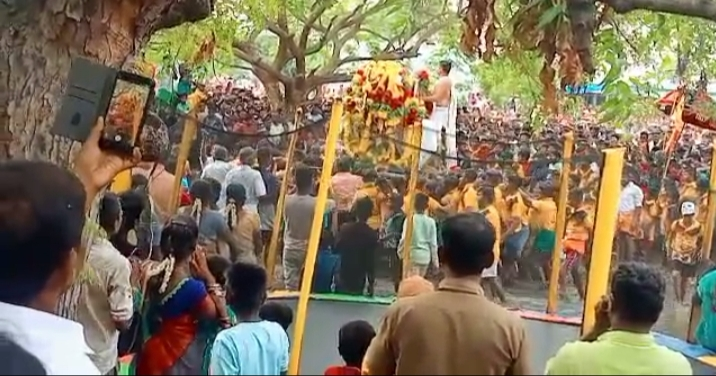
Kuppalnatham Chithirai thiruvilla festival 2023

Sri Venkatajalapathi Perumal, who resided in this temple, descends on the Chitra Poornami day in a white horse vehicle in the Srikallagar Thirukolam. On k. Paramanpatti village near Poigai malai river sri kallagar Chithirai thiruvilla was grandly celebrated, on the day of thefestival more than 18 villages gathered in the river to celebrate the festival.

The festival is celebrated in Kupalnatham k. Andipatti, k. Paramanpatti villages and three more mandapadis namely Thantraiyar (Kuppalnatham Thantrayaan Temple Hall) Sedapatti (Sedapattiyar Mandapam). Malayapar (Mountain Perumal Temple Hall) Samanar Temple Hall, Mettanur Kallupatti (Kallupatiyar Mandapam). Chinnakattalai (Commander Hall) S. Chennampatti, (Chennampattiyar Mandapam). The festival that unites the people of different villages.

== History of the temple ==
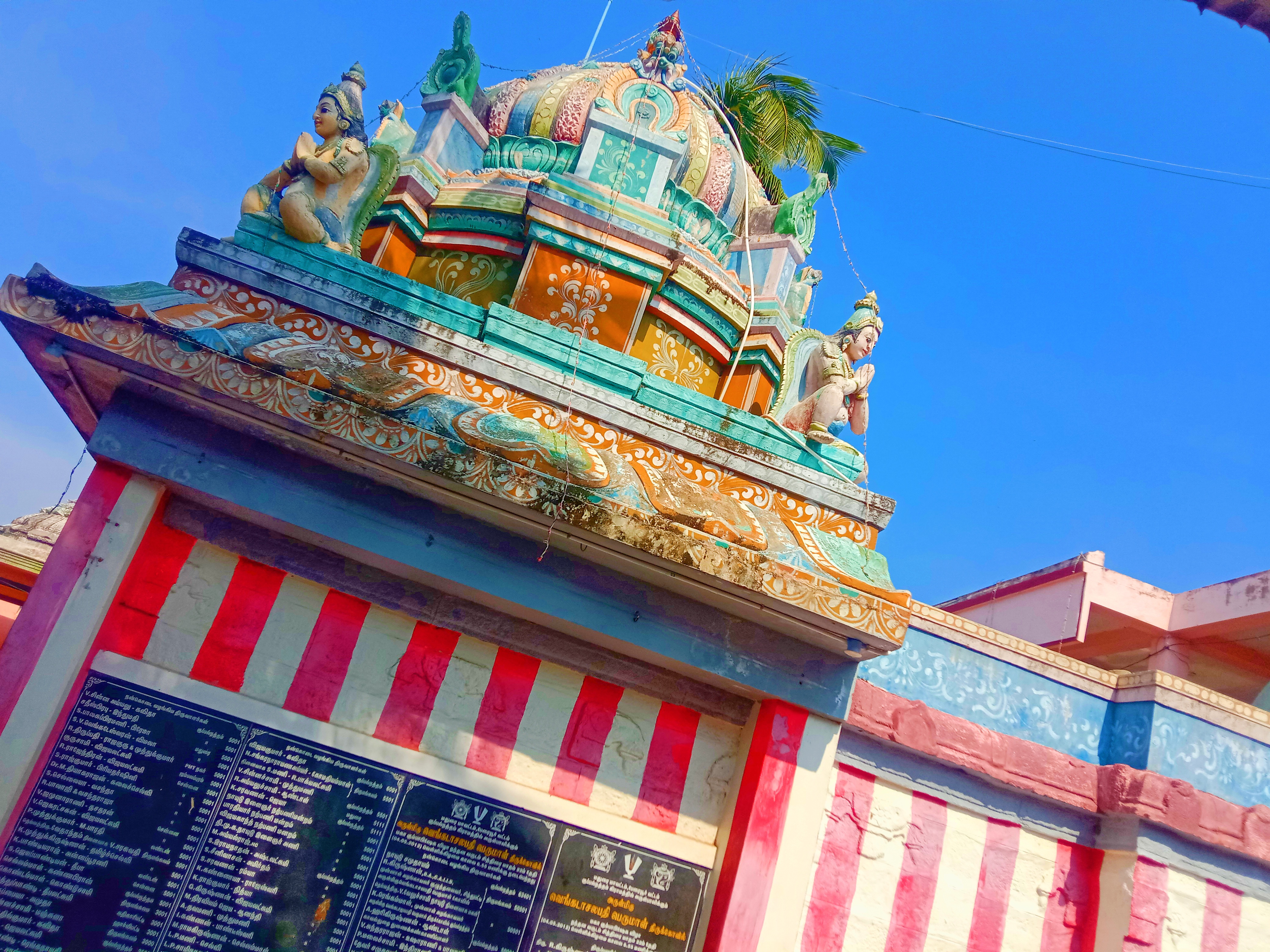
Sri vengdajalpathi perumal temple kuppalnatham

Sri vengdajalpathi perumal temple was built in the period of thirumalai nayakar on kuppalnatham village near the small lake and the temple was 400 years old.

== Sanathi in the temple ==
Excluding Moolavar and Urchavar, there are anjunayar sanathi, Navagraha sanathi, vinayagar sanathi and ammal sanathi is located there.
