= Madurai East block =

Coordinates: 9°55′41″N 77°58′29″E

Madurai East block is a revenue block in the Madurai district of Tamil Nadu, India. It has a total of 39 panchayat villages.
