= Madurai West block =

Revenue block in Tamil Nadu, India

Madurai West block is a revenue block in the Madurai district of Tamil Nadu, India. It has a total of 32 panchayat villages.
