= Sedapatti =

- Village
- Sedapatti, Madurai district, Tamil Nadu
- Coordinates: 9.8118°N 77.7937°E
- Country: India
- State: Tamil Nadu
- District: Madurai

Government
  - Type: TN government

Sedapatti is a neighbourhood in Madurai district in the Indian State of Tamil Nadu.

== Location ==
The coordinates of Sedapatti are: 9°49'19"N77°47'53"E. It is a village near Usilampatti which is a part of Madurai District in Tamil Nadu. Sedapatti (State Assembly Constituency) is based on this village.

== Revenue Blocks ==
This village is a part of one of the Revenue Blocks (Taluk) of Madurai District, which contains the following panchayat villages under it.

- Athankaraipatti
- Athikaripatti
- Athipatti
- Chinnakattalai
- E. Kottaipatty
- Kalappanpatti
- Kethuvarpatti
- Kudicheri
- Kudipatty
- Kuppalnatham
- Mallapuram
- Melathirumanickam
- Muthunagaiapuram
- Palaiyur
- Pappinaickanpatty
- Peraiyampatty
- Periakattalai
- Perungamanallur
- Poosalpuram
- Saptoor Sedapatty
- Seelnaickanpatty
- Sembarani
- Soolapuram
- Thadaiyampatty
- Thirumanickam
- Thullukuttinaickanur
- Uthappuram
- Vandapuli
- Vandari
- Veppampatty

== Notable personalities ==
Notable personalities connected to this place are,

- Sedapatti Muthiah
- S. S. Rajendran
