= Madurai-South taluk =

Coordinates: 9°52′41″N 78°02′20″E

Madurai-South taluk is a Thiruparankundram taluk of Madurai district of the Indian state of Tamil Nadu.

== Demographics ==
According to the 2011 census, the taluk of Madurai-South had a population of 1,389,379 with 696,879 males and 692,500 females. There were 994 women for every 1,000 men. The taluk had a literacy rate of 81.26%. Child population in the age group below 6 years were 66,225 Males and 63,397 Females.
