= Madurai-North taluk =

Coordinates: 9°56′07″N 78°05′17″E

Madurai-North taluk is a taluk of Madurai district of the Indian state of Tamil Nadu.

== Demographics ==
According to the census taken in 2011, the taluk of Madurai North had a population of 493,838 with 248,437 males and 245,401 females. There were 988 women for every 1,000 men. The taluk had a literacy rate of 78.17%. the population of children aged below 6 years were 24,459 males and 23,016 females.
