= Kuppalnatham =

- Village
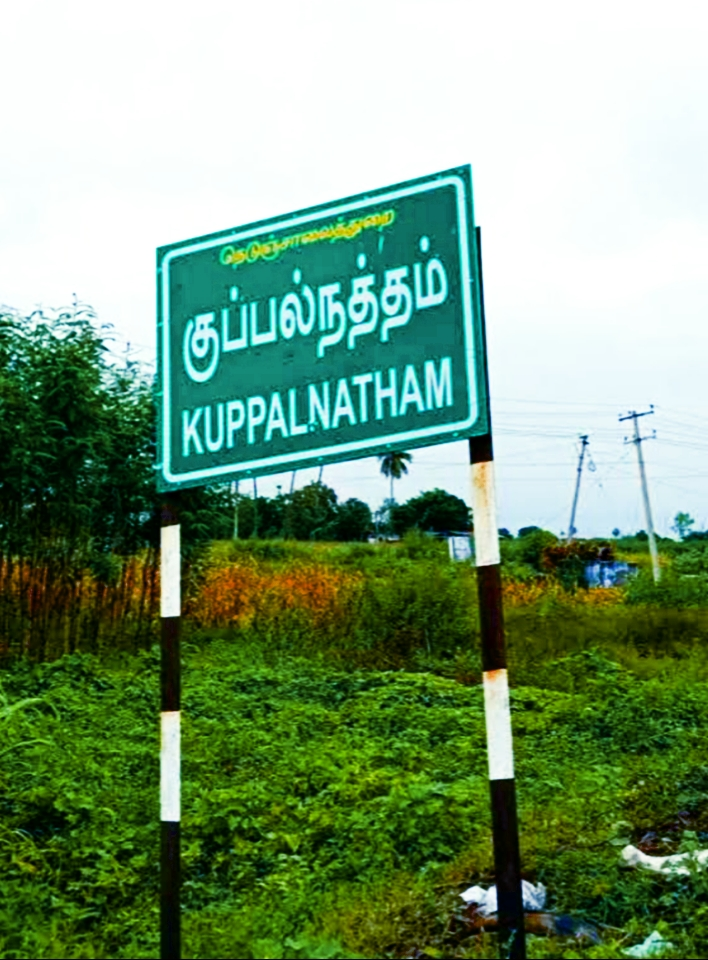
- Country: India
- district: Madurai
- Block: Sedapati
- taluka: Peraiyur
- Founder: By madurai nayakas
- Seat: Tamil Nadu government (தமிழ்நாடு அரசு )

Government
  - President (கிராமத் தலைவர் ): P.murugan (DMK)

Area
  - Total: 2.84 km^{2} (1.10 sq mi)

Population
  - Total: 1,958 (2,011 cense)
  - Density: 241.35/km^{2} (625.1/sq mi)
- Demonym: (குப்பல்நத்தம் மக்கள்)
- Time zone: Indian standard Time
  - Summer (DST): IND
- PIN: 625527
- STD: 0452

Kuppalnatham (குப்பல்நத்தம்) is a village in Sedapatti Panchayat Union in Madurai district of Tamil Nadu, India. This municipality falls under Usilampatti Legislative Assembly constituency and Theni People's Assembly constituency. It has a total of 7 panchayat constituencies. 7 Panchayat Council members are elected from these. According to the census, the total population is 2071 . Among them there are 1010 females and 1061 males. The size of the area is about 2.84 square kilometres.

== Classification of people ==
As per available data from the year 2009, 1925 persons live in 551 households in the village Kuppalnatham. There are 947 female individuals and 978 male individuals in the village. Females constitute 49.19% and males constitute 50.81% of the total population.

There are 225 scheduled castes persons of which 108 are females and 117 are males. Females constitute 48% and males constitute 52% of the scheduled castes population. Scheduled castes constitute 11.69% of the total population.

== Geography ==
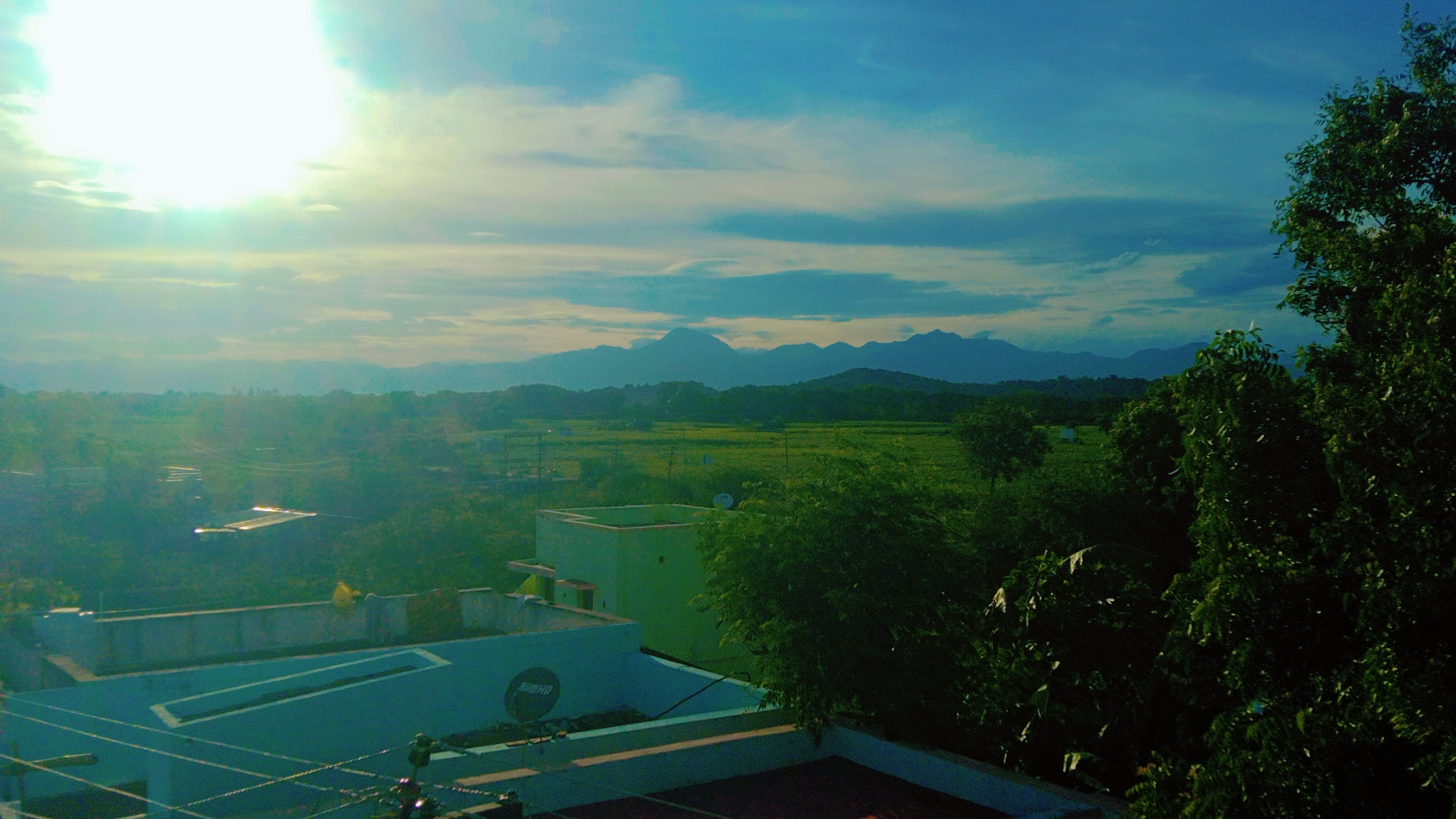
Kuppalnatham

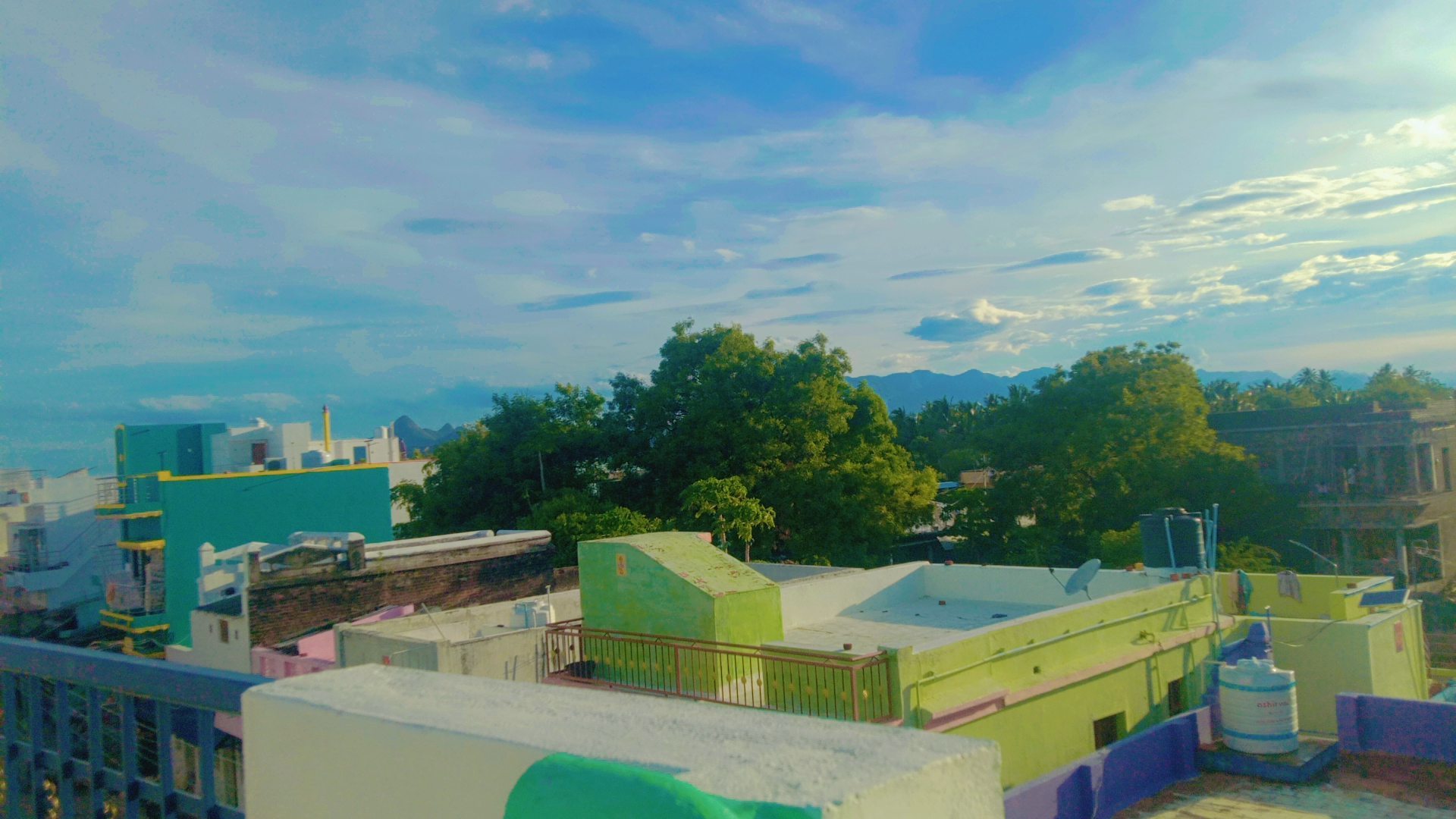
Kuppalnatham

Total area of Kuppalnatham is 797.6 Hectares as per the data available for the year 2009.

Total sown/agricultural area is 267.87 ha. About 38.2 ha is un-irrigated area. About 229.67 ha is irrigated area. About 173.84 ha is irrigated by wells/tube wells. About 55.83 ha is irrigated by tanks/lakes. About 183.5 ha is in non-agricultural use. About 1.67 ha is under miscellaneous tree crops. About 2.01 ha is culturable waste land. About 342.55 ha is lying as fallow land other than current fallows.

== Festivals in kuppalnatham ==
Kuppalnatham chithirai thiruvilla:

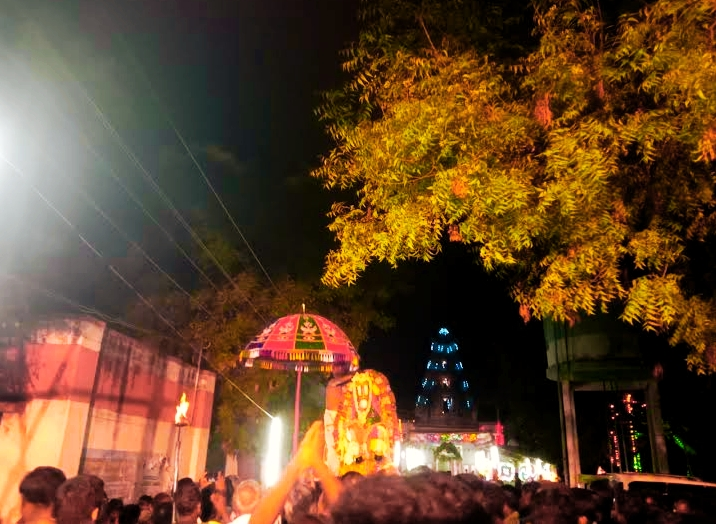
Kuppalnatham chithirai thiruvilla

Sri Venkatajalapathi Perumal, who resided in this temple, descends on the Chitra Poornami day in a white horse vehicle in the Srikallagar Thirukolam. On k. Paramanpatti village near Poigai malai river sri kallagar Chithirai thiruvilla was grandly celebrated, on the day of thefestival more than 18 villages gathered in the river to celebrate the festival.

The festival is celebrated in Kupalnatham k. Andipatti, k. Paramanpatti villages and three more mandapadis namely Thantraiyar (Kuppalnatham Thantrayaan Temple Hall) Sedapatti (Sedapattiyar Mandapam). Malayapar (Mountain Perumal Temple Hall) Samanar Temple Hall, Mettanur Kallupatti (Kallupatiyar Mandapam). Chinnakattalai (Commander Hall) S. Chennampatti, (Chennampattiyar Mandapam). The festival that unites the people of different villages.

Pongal festival

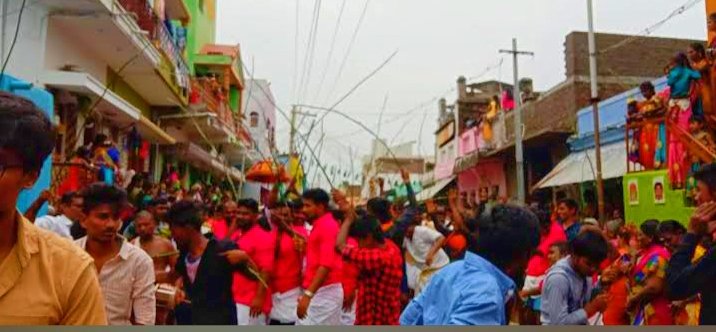
Kuppalnatham

Pongal festival also is important festival for kuppalnatham villagers, which is held 3 days in konnammal temple and kruppaswamy temple. This festival is organised by naidu people grandly.

Kaliamman Kovil thiruvilla or panguni thiruvilla:

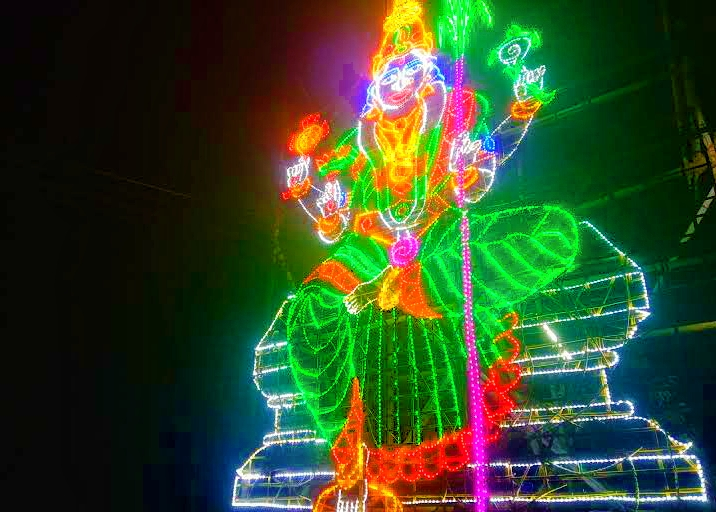
Kuppalnatham

Kaliamman Kovil festival was celebrated before a chithirai thiruvilla in the month of panguni. Women's in kuppalnatham celebrates by taking molaparri for kaliamman and this festival is nearly celebrated one and half days.

Other Small festivals:

1. Manthaiamman Kovil festival
2. Vaigonda ekathesi
3. Muniyandiswamy pujas

== Temples ==
- Sri Vengdajalpathi Perumal Temple Kuppalnatham
- Kuppalnatham Poigai Malai Jain Cave Temple
- Arulmigu Sri Kalliamman Kovil
- Karuppaswamy Kovil
- Muliyandi Swamy Kovil
- Arulmigu Konammal Kovil
