= Peraiyur =

Peraiyur Peraiyur
- Nagar panchayat
- Location in Tamil Nadu, India
- Coordinates: 9.72°N 77.8°E
- Country: India
- State: Tamil Nadu
- District: Madurai
- Taluk: Peraiyur

Government
  - Type: Taluk
  - Body: Nagar panchayat
- Elevation: 150 m (490 ft)

Population (2001)
  - Total: 8,880
- Demonym: Peraiyurar

Languages
  - Official: Tamil
- Time zone: UTC+5:30 (IST)
- PIN: 625703
- Vehicle registration: TN-58Z(Thirumangalam RTO)

Peraiyur is a panchayat town in Madurai district in the Indian state of Tamil Nadu. It is one of the Revenue blocks of Madurai District. Peraiyur is the headquarters of the Peraiyur taluk.

== Location ==
Peraiyur is 42 kilometres (26 mi) southwest of Madurai and 28 kilometres (17 mi) southeast of Virudhunagar. It comes under the Usilampatti Educational District.

Peraiyur is located at 9.72°N 77.8°E. It has an average elevation of 150 metres (492 feet).

== Demographics ==
As of 2001 India census, Peraiyur had a population of 8880. Males constitute 51% of the population and females 49%. Peraiyur has an average literacy rate of 66%, higher than the national average of 59.5%: male literacy is 73%, and female literacy is 59%. In Peraiyur, 11% of the population is under 6 years of age.

== Politics ==
It is part of the Madurai (Lok Sabha constituency). S. Venkatesan also known as Su. Venkatesan from CPI(M) is the Member of Parliament, Lok Sabha, after his election in the 2019 Indian general election.
