= Madurai district =

- District
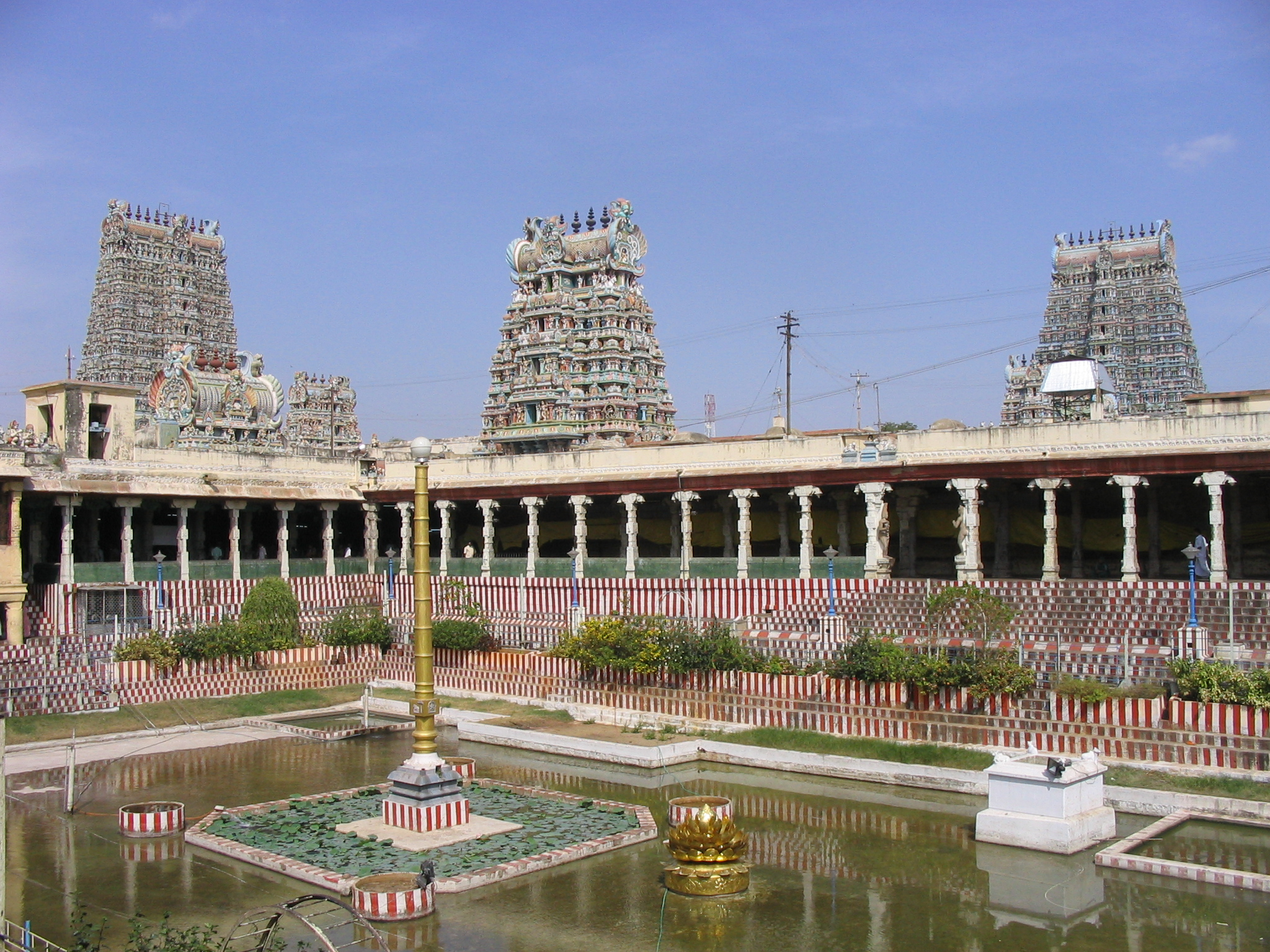
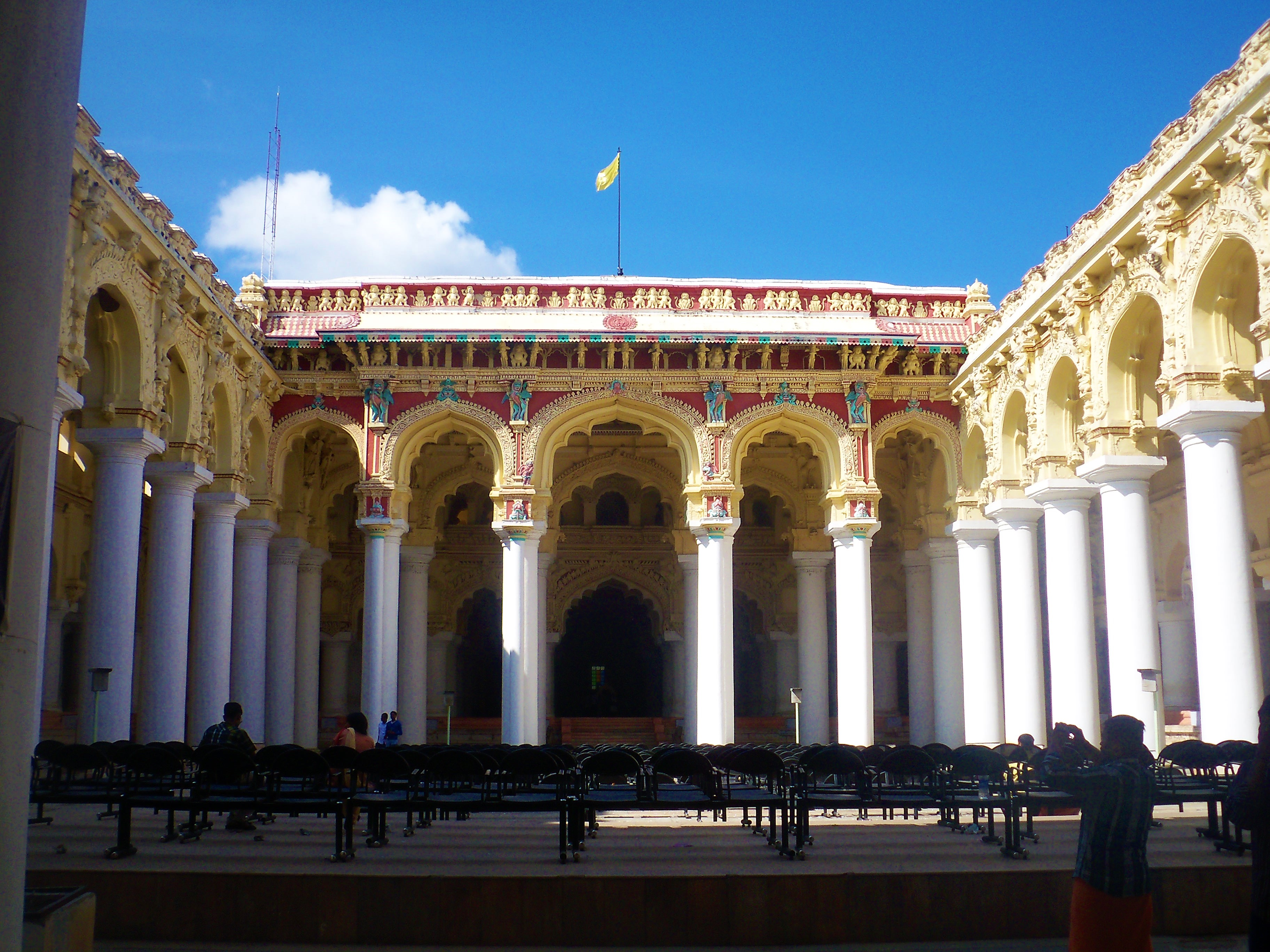
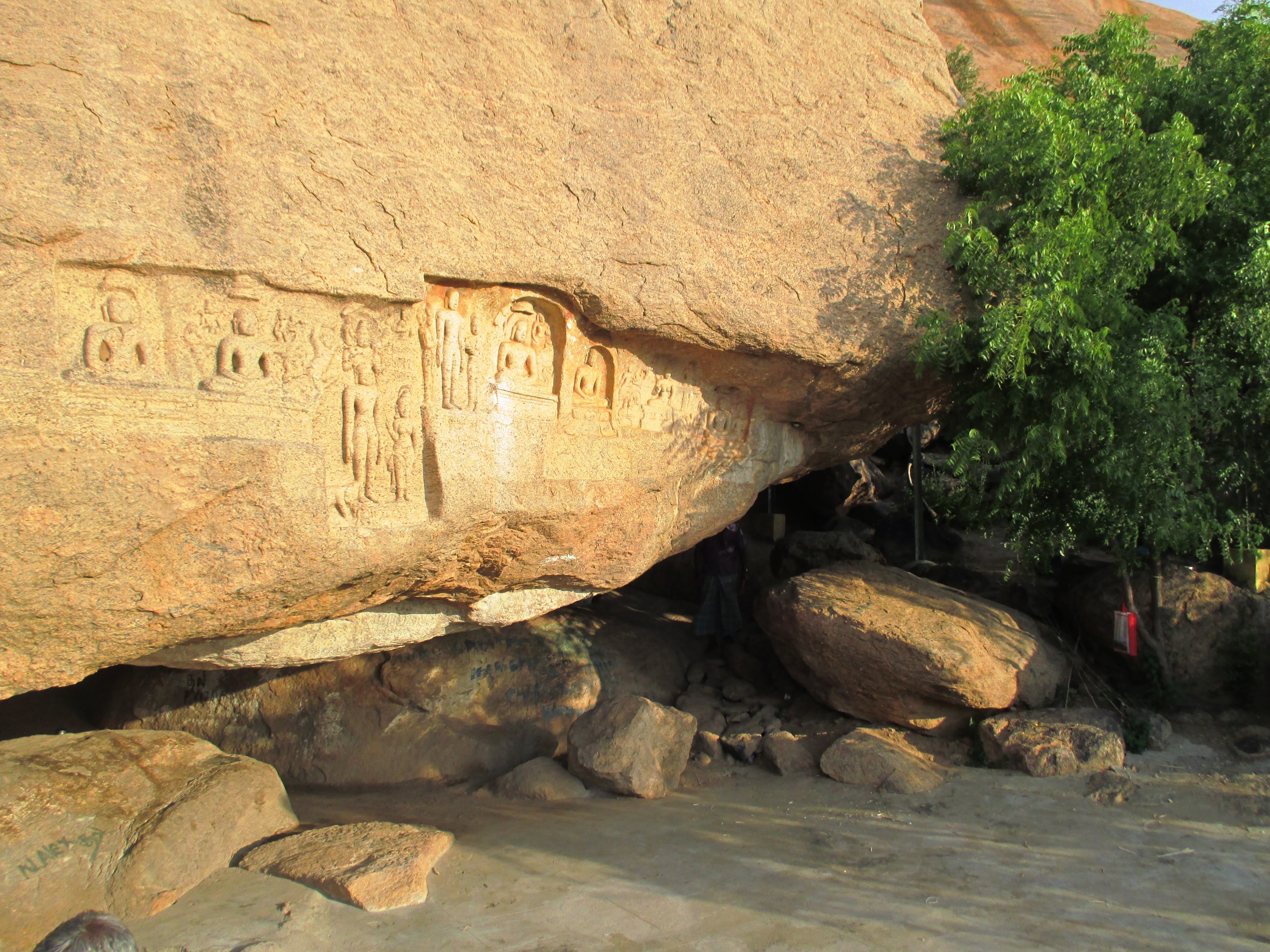
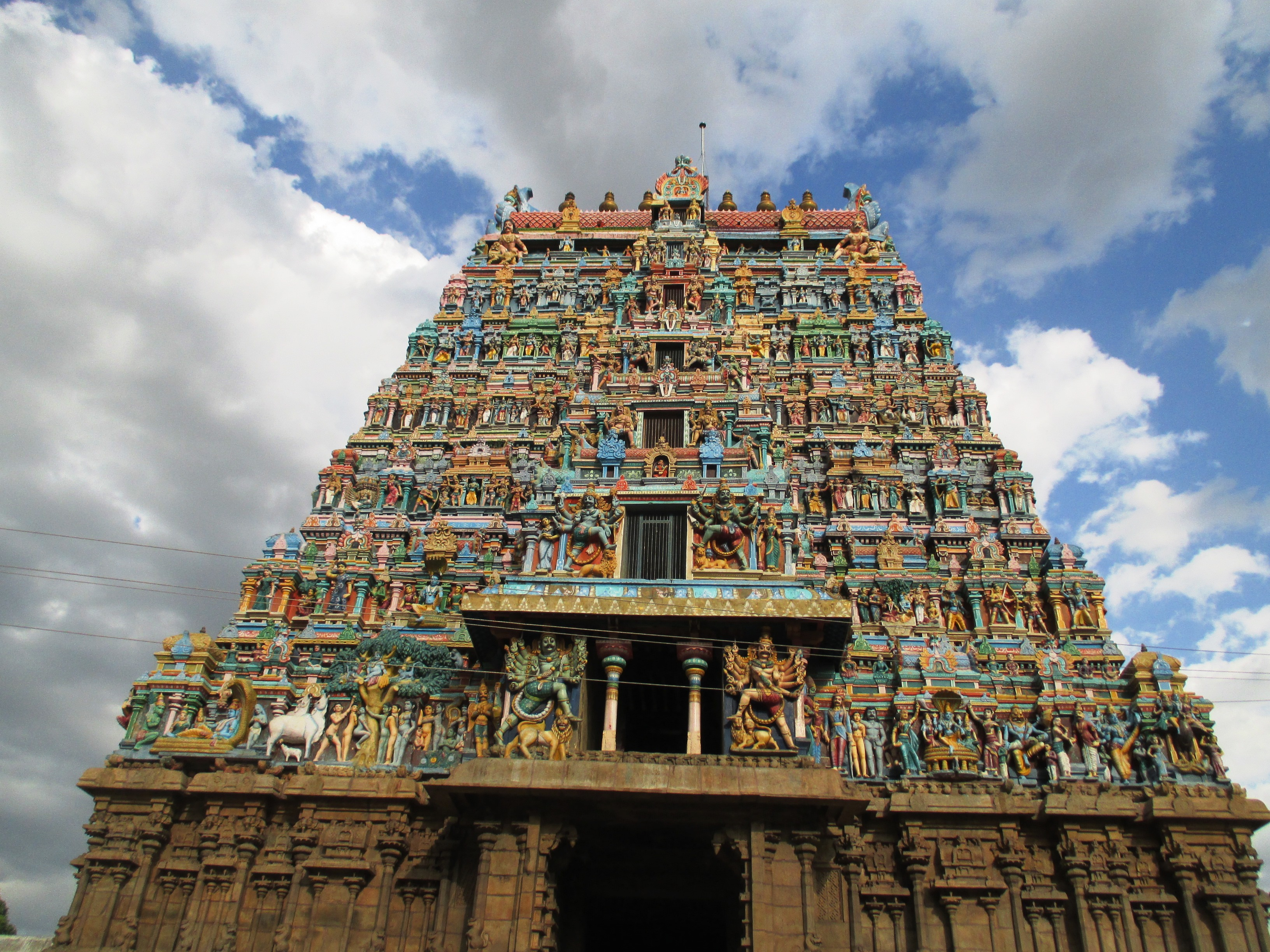
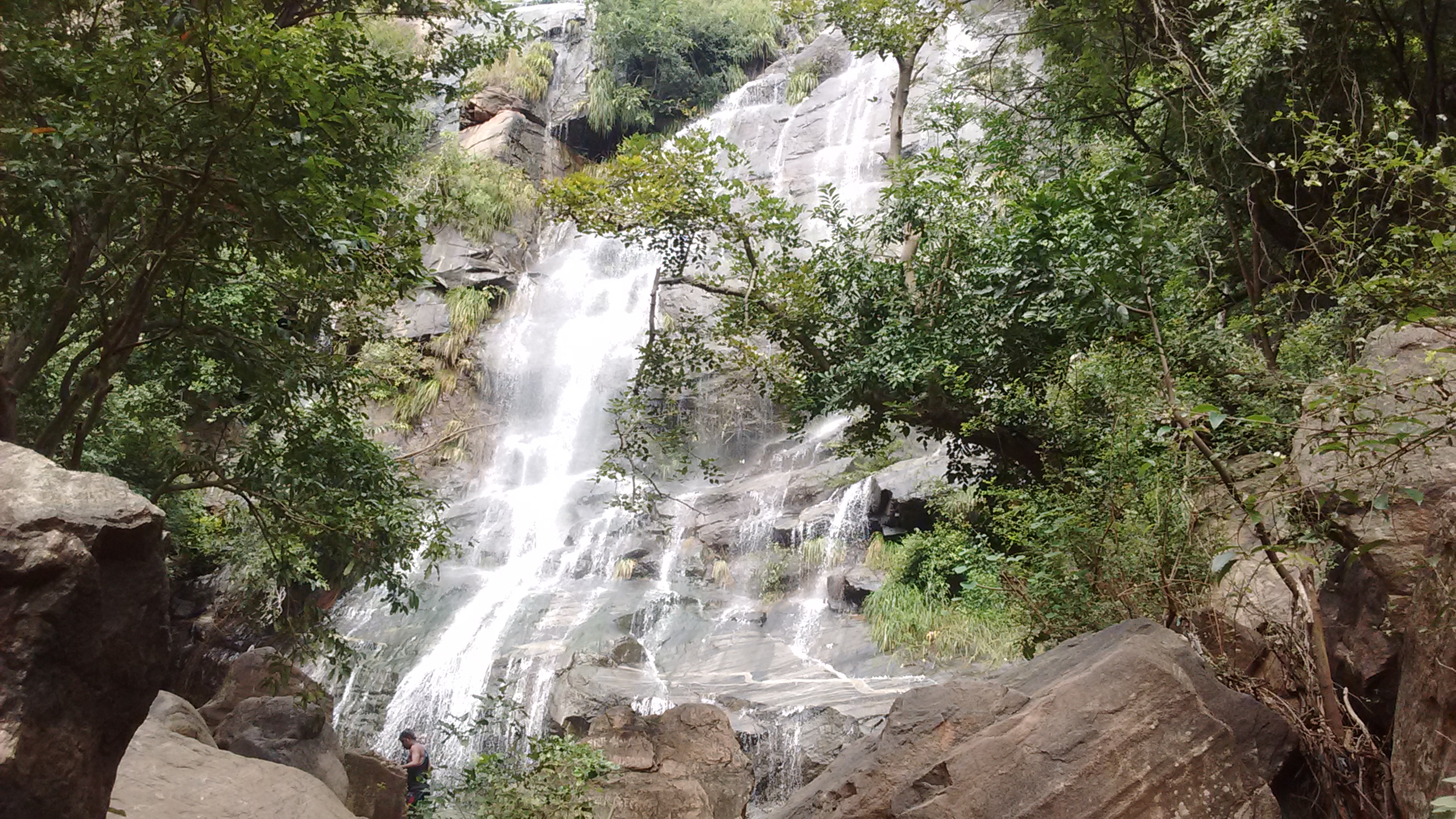
- Clockwise from top-left: Meenakshi Amman Temple, Thirumalai Nayakkar Mahal, Alagar Koyil, Kutladampatti Falls, Jain carvings at Yanamalai Hills
- Interactive map of Madurai district
- Coordinates: 09°50′N 077°50′E
- Country: India
- State: Tamil Nadu
- Region: Pandya Nadu
- Municipal Corporations: Madurai Municipal Corporation
- Headquarters: Madurai
- Taluks: Madurai North, Madurai South, Madurai East, Madurai West, Melur, Peraiyur, Tirumangalam, Thiruparankundram, Usilampatti, Vadipatti, Kalligudi

Government
  - Type: District Administration
  - Body: Madurai District Collectorate
  - District Collector: M. S. Sangeetha, I.A.S.
  - Superintendent of Police: Dongare Pravin Umesh, I.P.S.

Area
  - Total: 3,710 km^{2} (1,430 sq mi)
  - Rank: 16

Population (2011)
  - Total: 3,038,252
  - Rank: 4
  - Density: 812/km^{2} (2,100/sq mi)

Languages
  - Official: Tamil and English
- Time zone: UTC+5:30 (IST)
- PIN: 625xxx
- Telephone code: 0452
- Vehicle registration: TN-58, TN-59, TN-64
- Coastline: 0 kilometres (0 mi)
- Largest city: Madurai
- Sex ratio: ♂-50.5% / ♀-49.5%
- Literacy: 81.5%
- Lok Sabha constituency: 1
- Assembly constituency: 10
- Website: www.madurai.tn.nic.in

Madurai district is one of the 38 districts of the state of Tamil Nadu in southeastern India. The city of Madurai serves as the district headquarters. It houses the famous Arulmigu Meenakshi Sundareshwarar Temple and is situated on the banks of the river Vaigai. Thiruparankundram is one of the major tourist places in the district. As of 2011, the district had a population of 3,038,252 with a sex-ratio of 990 females for every 1,000 males. Aside from the city of Madurai, the larger towns of the district include Melur, Vadipatti, Thirumangalam, Thirupparankundram, Peraiyur, and Usilampatti.

== History ==
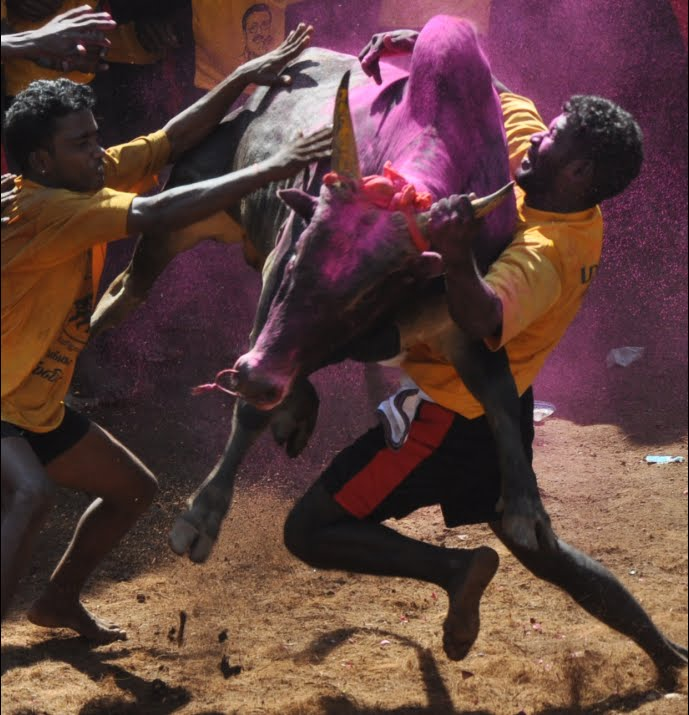
The Jallikattu at Alanganallur

The main kingdoms which ruled Madurai are the Pandyas and the Nayaks.

== Geography ==
The district is bounded by Theni in the west, Sivaganga in the east, Dindigul in the north, Virudhunagar in the south and small parts of Tiruchirappalli in the northeast.

=== Climate ===
Madurai

Climate chart (precipitation, max. and min. temperature)
J	F	M	A	M	J	J	A	S	O	N	D
20 30 20	14 32 21	18 35 23	55 38 25	70 37 26	40 36 26	50 36 25	104 35 25	119 34 24	188 33 24	145 30 23	51 29 21
- █ Average max. and min. temperatures in °C
- █ Precipitation totals in mm
Imperial conversion
J	F	M	A	M	J	J	A	S	O	N	D
0.8 86 68	0.5 90 70	0.7 95 73	2.2 100 77	2.8 99 79	1.6 97 79	1.9 96 77	4.1 95 77	4.7 93 75	7.4 91 75	5.7 86 73	2 84 70
- █ Average max. and min. temperatures in °F
- █ Precipitation totals in inches

The climate has extremes. There are three distinct periods of rainfall:

- advancing monsoon period and south west monsoon from June to September, with strong southwest winds;
- north east monsoon from October to December, with dominant north east winds;
- dry season from January to May.
- Madurai District is the hottest district of Tamil Nadu throughout the year. district receives average rainfall and heavy heat which is prevails from March to September. Madurai recorded 42°C at the time of September month.

== Demographics ==
Historical population
Year	Pop.	±% p.a.
1901	666,940	—
1911	769,360	+1.44%
1921	800,795	+0.40%
1931	896,876	+1.14%
1941	1,014,602	+1.24%
1951	1,223,574	+1.89%
1961	1,378,734	+1.20%
1971	1,730,109	+2.30%
1981	2,042,704	+1.67%
1991	2,400,339	+1.63%
2001	2,578,201	+0.72%
2011	3,038,252	+1.66%

Religions in Madurai district (2011)
Religion	Percent
Hinduism	90.86%
Islam	5.56%
Christianity	3.22%
Other or not stated	0.36%

According to the 2011 census, Madurai district had a population of 3,038,252, up from 2,578,201 in the 2001 census, for a growth rate of 17.95%. It had a sex-ratio of 990 females for every 1,000 males, up from 978 in 2001, and much above the national average of 929. A total of 313,978 were under the age of six, constituting 162,517 males and 151,461 females. Scheduled Castes and Scheduled Tribes accounted for 13.46% and 0.37% of the population, respectively. The average literacy of the district was 74.83%, compared to the national average of 72.99%. 60.78% of the population lives in urban areas.

The district had a total of 794,887 households. There were a total of 1,354,632 workers, comprising 81,352 cultivators, 287,731 main agricultural labourers, 39,753 in house hold industries, 765,066 other workers, 180,730 marginal workers, 11,367 marginal cultivators, 85,097 marginal agricultural labourers, 7,540 marginal workers in household industries and 76,726 other marginal workers.

Languages of Madurai district (2011)
1. Tamil (92.6%)
2. Saurashtra (3.20%)
3. Telugu (2.58%)
4. Others (1.66%)

At the time of the 2011 census, 92.56% of the population spoke Tamil, 3.20% Saurashtra and 2.58% Telugu as their first language.

== Politics ==
District	No.	Constituency	Name	Party	Alliance	Remarks
Madurai	188	Melur	P. Viswanathan	INC	SSJVA	Won as SPA candidate; party switched to TVK+ post-election; Cabinet Minister
Madurai	189	Madurai East	S. Karthikeyan	TVK	SSJVA	
Madurai	190	Sholavandan (SC)	M. V. Karuppiah	TVK	SSJVA	
Madurai	191	Madurai North	A. Kallanai	TVK	SSJVA	
Madurai	192	Madurai South	M. M. Gopison	TVK	SSJVA	
Madurai	193	Madurai Central	Madhar Badhurudeen	TVK	SSJVA	
Madurai	194	Madurai West	S. R. Thangapandi	TVK	SSJVA	
Madurai	195	Thiruparankundram	C. T. R. Nirmal Kumar	TVK	SSJVA	Cabinet Minister
Madurai	196	Thirumangalam	Sedapatti M. Manimaran	DMK	SPA	
Madurai	197	Usilampatti	M. Vijay	TVK	SSJVA	

Madurai district contains the entirety of Madurai Lok Sabha constituency[(state assembly constituency of Madurai North, Madurai South, Madurai East, Madurai West, Madurai Central, and Melur], and parts of Theni Lok Sabha constituency[(Usilampatti and Sholavandan] and Virudhunagar Lok Sabha constituency[(Thiruparankundram and Thirumangalam]] Lok Sabha constituencies.

== Divisions ==
Madurai district comprises 13 talukas and revenue blocks, of the same names and boundaries. Under the gram panchayat system rural administration of the district is done by panchayat villages and the taluka headquarters. The revenue blocks are further sub-divided by firkas. The three taluks, Tiruparankundram, Madurai West and Madurai East, were created in February 2014. The thirteen talukas/blocks are:

- Thiruparankundram—7 firkas
- Peraiyur—3 firkas
- Tirumangalam—3 firkas
- Kalligudi
- Sedapatti
- Usilampatti
- Vadipatti
- Melur
- Alanganallur
- Madurai West
- Madurai East
- Madurai North
- Madurai South

=== 2001 census ===
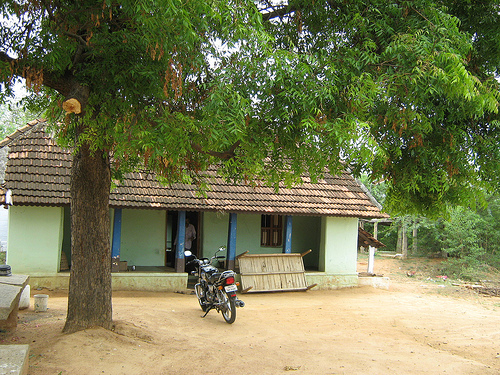
Village house in Melur

In the 2001 census, Madurai district had only seven talukas: Madurai North, Madurai South, Melur, Peraiyur, Thirumangalam, Vadipatti, and Usilampatti.

== Tourist attractions ==
- Madurai Meenakshiamman Temple
- Alagar temple
- Gandhi Memorial Museum, Madurai
- Thirumalai Nayakar Mahal
- Theppakulam
- Madurai Maqbara
- Thirumohoor Kalamegaperumal Temple
- Thirupparamkunram Murugan Temple
- Kuruvithurai Chitra Ratha Vallabha Perumal Temple
- Vaigai Dam
- Kodaikanal
- Suruli Falls
- Kutladampatti Falls
- Kazimar Big Mosque

== Localities ==
- Kannadendal

== See also ==
- List of districts of Tamil Nadu
