= Chellampatti =

Chellampatti may refer to several places in the state of Tamil Nadu, India:

- Chellampatti, Dharmapuri, a village in Harur taluk, Dharmapuri district
- Chellampatti, Erode, a village in Ammapet taluk, Erode district
- Chellampatti, Madurai, a village in Thirumangalam taluk, Madurai district
- Chellampatti, Orathanadu, a sub-village of Vadakkur South, Orathanadu taluk, Thanjavur district
- Chellampatti, Thanjavur, a neighbourhood in Thanjavur City, Thanjavur Taluk, Thanjavur district
