= Thiruvedagam =

- Village
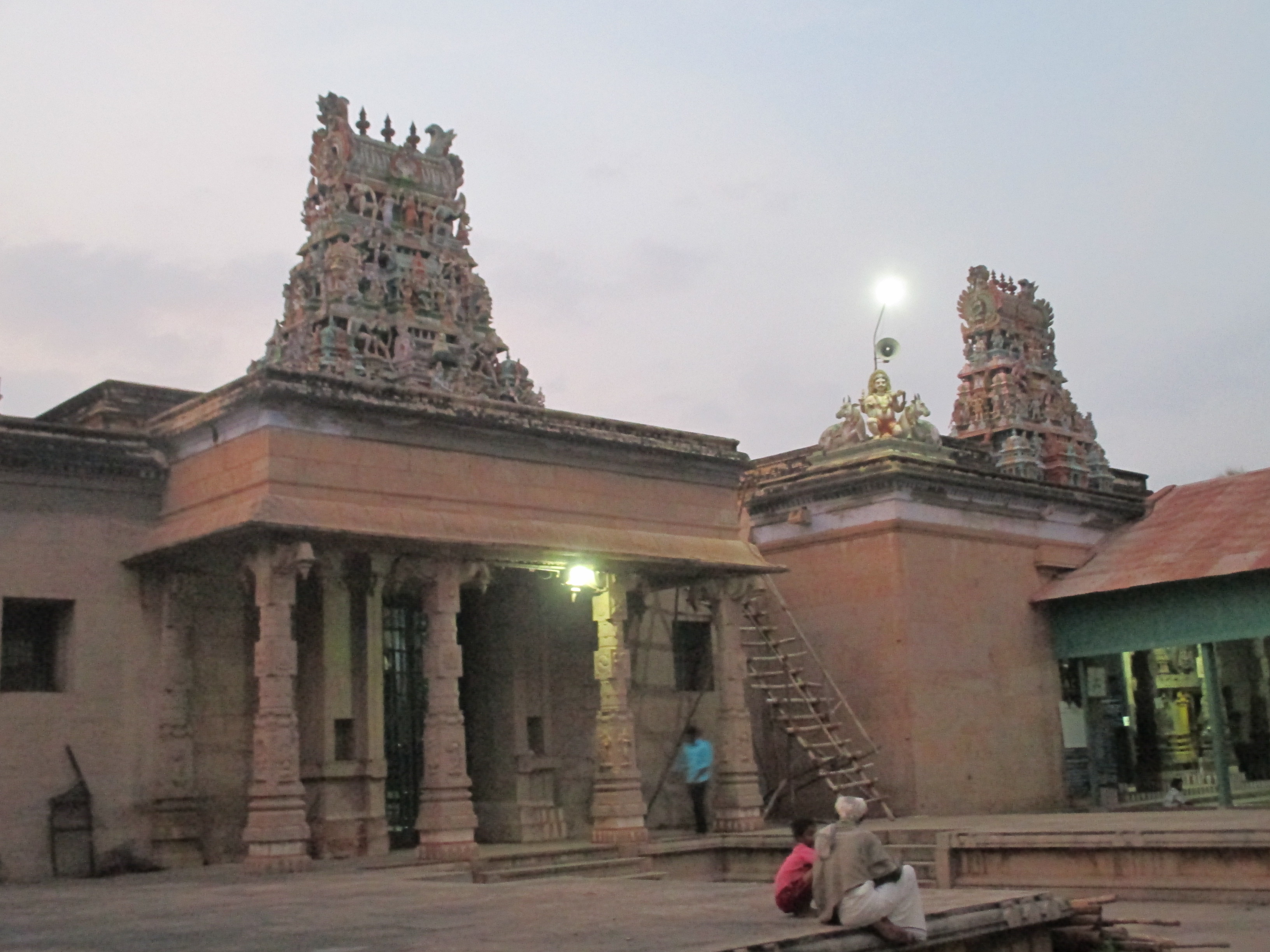

- Location in Tamil Nadu, India Thiruvedagam (India)
- Coordinates: 9.985958°N 77.993102°E
- Country: India
- State: Tamil Nadu
- District: Madurai

Population (2001)
  - Total: 1,253

Languages
  - Official: Tamil
- Time zone: UTC+5:30 (IST)
- PIN: 625234
- Telephone code: (91)04543
- Vehicle registration: TN-59
- Nearest city: Madurai
- Lok Sabha constituency: Dindugul
- Vidhan Sabha constituency: Sholavandan

Thiruvedagam is a village located in between Sholavandan and Madurai. It is 18 kilometres (11 miles) away from Madurai and 3 kilometres (2 miles) away from Sholavandan. It comes under Vadipatti taluk in Madurai district. It is located at the bank of the River Vaigai, which flows in the direction North to South here in Thiruvedagam. Here a famous and historical Shiva temple named Edaganathar temple is located.

== Legendary history of the village ==
Thiruvedagam village which was occupied by the Samanars, changed the course of history. The Pandya King Arikesari Nedumaran who belonged to the Saivaite faith, due to the clever tactics of the Samanar community, underwent a conversion. He deviated from the path of virtue and his subjects also followed their ruler. The Saivaite queen sent an emissary to Gnana Sambandhar and requested him to save the king and the subjects from the Samanar's grip.

Acceding to her request, Sambandhar with the blessings of Appar, paid a visit to Madurai. Stirred and worried by his visit, the Samanars burnt the monastery of Sambandhar and this reflected on the King, who was afflicted with leprosy. Both the Samanars and Sambandhar treated the disease. The Samanars efforts proved futile while the sacred ash given by Sambandhar to the King cured him.

Angered by this, the Samanars challenged Sambandhar to 'anall vaadham' (hot dispute) and 'punall vaadham' (cold dispute). Defeated by Sambandhar in the anall vaadham, they got down to punall vaadham. The Samanars wrote ' Athi Naathi' on a palmyra leaf and floated it down the river Vaigai, while Sambandhar wrote in Tamil:
'வாழ்க அந்தணர் வானவர் ஆனினம்
வீழ்க தண்புனல் வேந்தனும் ஓங்குக
ஆழ்க தீயதெல்லாம் அரன் நாமமே
சூழ்க வையக முந்துயர் தீர்கவே'
and floated it down the Vaigai. The palmyra leaf that Sambandhar floated reached the bank on the other side where there lies an idol of Lord Ganesha who is known as " vaathu venra vinayakar " ..

Sambandhar feeling happy called the place as 'Edu Senranai Tharum Edagam' which came to be known as Thiruvedagam. The palmyra leaf which the Samanars left was swept away by the river and reached 'Thirupasethi'( thiru + pa + serthal) later to be known as thirupachetty.

The Vaigai River flows in the direction North to South here in Thiruvedagam. So it is said to be as good as praying in Kashi. A Shiva temple known as "Edaganathan Temple" is situated in the middle of the village.It is the second most important Lord Shiva temple in madurai district.More than 60% agricultural land of the village owned by temple.

== Dargah of Syed Sha Husain Parhez ==
=== History ===
This dargah continues to exist from 12th century.

=== Anniversary Urs Festival ===
The anniversary urus festival of this dargah happens on 26th of the Islamic month of muharram.

== Education ==
In Thiruvedagam one government middle school and two private schools (Vivekananda nursery and Vivekananda higher secondary school managed by Ramakrisha Tapovanam) are there.

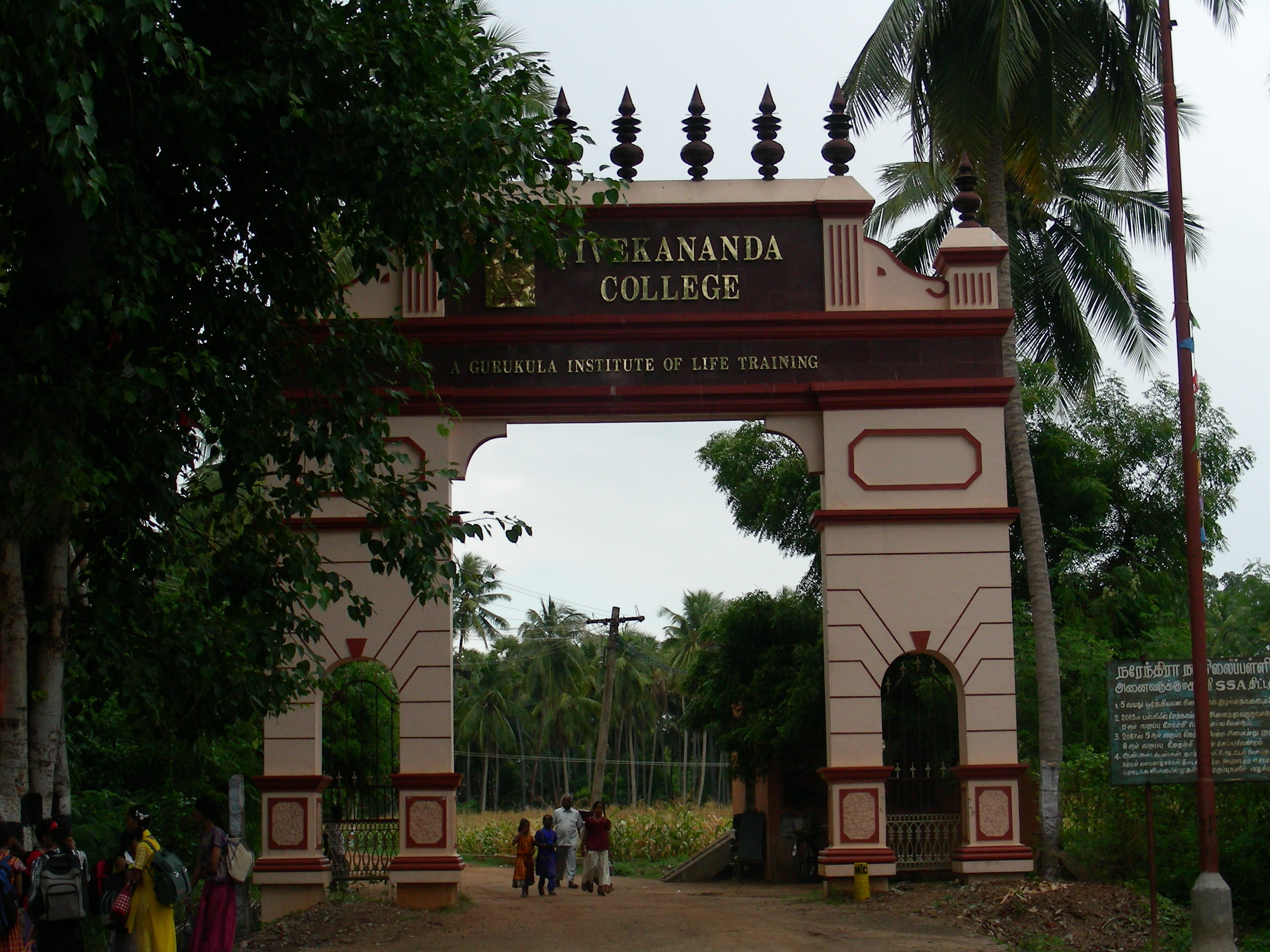
A welcome arch at the entrance to the college

Vivekananda College is an autonomous college of Arts and Sciences in Thiruvedagam in Madurai district. It was founded in 1971 by Swami Chidbhavananda and is managed by Ramakrishna Tapovanam. It is by far the only registered Gurukula institute of Life training in modern India. The National Assessment and Accreditation Council has given the `A' grade for the college when it was reaccredited.

== Transportation ==
By City Bus:

- Bus No. 63, 68, 54, 29A, 29LSS - from Madurai Periyar Bus stand
- Bus No. 28 - from Madurai Anna Bus stand
- Bus No. 93 - from Madurai Matuthavani Bus stand
- Bus No. 4 - from Thirumangalam, Madurai

By Long route Buses: Madurai to Nillakottai (TNSTC). Stop: Thiruvedagam.

By Train: Stop: Sholavandan. Station code: SDN. after which a bus is necessary to reach Thiruvedagam itself.

Express trains do not stop in Sholavandan, except the Nellai Express (Train number: 2631/2632) and Mysore Express (Train number: 6731/6732) which stop at Sholavandan on both directions.
