= Kuruvithurai =

Neighbourhood in Madurai district, Tamil Nadu, India

- Neighbourhood
- Kuruvithurai, Madurai district, Tamil Nadu
- Coordinates: 10.0576°N 77.9068°E
- Country: India
- State: Tamil Nadu
- District: Madurai
- Elevation: 212.22 m (696.3 ft)

Languages
  - Official: Tamil, English
  - Speech: Tamil, English
- Time zone: UTC+5:30 (IST)
- PIN: 625207
- Telephone code: +91452*******
- Other Neighbourhoods: Sholavandan, Samayanallur, Paravai, Mannadimangalam, T. Vadipatti
- LS: Theni
- VS: Sholavandan

Kuruvithurai is neighbourhood in Madurai district, It is a fertile area suitable for agriculture, near Sholavandan.

== Location ==
Kuruvithurai is located with the coordinates of (10.0576°N 77.9068°E) near Samayanallur in Madurai district, of Tamil Nadu state in India.

Kuruvithurai (Tamil Nadu)

== Religion ==
=== Temple ===
A Perumal temple viz., Chitra Ratha Vallabha Perumal Temple which is maintained under the Hindu Religious and Charitable Endowments Department, Government of Tamil Nadu is situated at Kuruvithurai.

== Politics ==
Kuruvithurai neighbourhood falls under the Sholavandan Assembly constituency. Also, this area belongs to Theni Lok Sabha constituency.
