= Kalligudi =

Kalligudi Kalligudi, Chathiram
- Town
- Interactive map of Kalligudi
- Coordinates: 09°41′52.8″N 77°58′19.1″E
- Country: India
- State: Tamil Nadu
- District: Madurai
- Taluk: Kalligudi

Government
  - Body: K. Vellakulam

Languages
  - Official: Tamil
  - speaking: Tamil, Telugu
- Time zone: UTC+5:30 (IST)
- PIN: 625 701
- Telephone code: 04549
- Vehicle registration: TN- 58
- Nearest city: Madurai
- Lok Sabha constituency: Virudhunagar (Lok Sabha constituency)
- Vidhan Sabha constituency: Thirumangalam
- Civic agency: K. Vellakulam
- Climate: Winter, 28-30°C, Summer, 30-32°C

Kalligudi is a small town in Kalligudi (taluk), Madurai district, Tamil Nadu State, India.

Kalligudi Chattram is located on National Highway 7 (Jammu Kashmir to Kanyakumari Highway) from 35 km, south of Madurai and 15 km, south of Tirumangalam. Kalligudi village which was the original habitation is interior located approximately 2 km from the Highway. Over time due to the highway Kalligudi chattram became more populous.

Total population of Kalligudi panchayath is 3560.

== Amenities ==
There is one Govt. Hr. Sec. School and one Govt. Primary School. There are seven temples, two mosques and two churches. There is a police station, fire service, 24 h service Govt. Hospital and a railway station. There are three banks; Canara Bank, Tamil Nadu Mercantile Bank and MDCC Bank.

NGO Sitthar koodam runs a destitute children's homes Numkulandaigal illam.

== Politics ==
It is part of the Virudhunagar (Lok Sabha constituency) and Thirumangalam (State Assembly Constituency).

== Festivals ==
The festival is Puratasi pongal, which is celebrated in the month of October. This festival is celebrated by the people of Agathapatti, Kalligudi, Alangarapuram and Pallapacherry. Another festival is "Muniyandi Swamy Annathana Pooja" which is celebrated at Vadakkampatti village on January.

"Mariyamman, Kaliyamman, Muthalamman kovil Pooja" are other festivals.

== Adjacent communities ==
Vadakkampatti, Alangarapuram, Agathapatti, Lalapuram, Pottalpatti and Pallapacherry are the villages which comes under Kalligudi panchayath.

Surrounding villages are Vellakulam, Solampatti, Vadakampatti, Lalapuram (4 km), Agathapatti (2 km), Odaipatti (2 km), sennampatti (5 km), Karisalkalampatti (5 km), Sengapadai (3 km), Sivarakkottai (7 km), Rayapalayam (4 km), Puliampatty (5 km), T. Pudupatty (6 km) are the nearby villages to Kalligudi.
