= Kilakuyilkudi =

Neighbourhood in Madurai district, Tamil Nadu, India

Keelakuyilkudi
- Neighbourhood
- Keelakuyilkudi, Madurai district, Tamil Nadu
- Coordinates: 9.9120°N 78.0421°E
- Country: India
- State: Tamil Nadu
- District: Madurai
- Elevation: 170.9 m (561 ft)

Population (2011)
  - Total: 2,606

Languages
  - Official: Tamil, English
  - Speech: Tamil, English
- Time zone: UTC+5:30 (IST)
- PIN: 625019
- Telephone code: +91452*******
- Other Neighbourhoods: Nagamalai, Palkalai Nagar, Karadipatti, Virattipathu, Chekkanurani
- LS: Virudhunagar
- VS: Thiruparankundram

Keelakuyilkudi or Kilakuyilkudi is a neighbourhood in Madurai district of Tamil Nadu state in India. The place is notable for its Jaina inscriptions and monuments.

== Location ==
Keellhakkuyilkudi is located in Madurai district at the coordinates (9.9120°N 78.0421°E).

Kilakuyilkudi (Tamil Nadu)

== Population ==
According to the 2011 census of India, Kilakuyilkudi had a population of 2,606, of whom 1,339 were males and 1,257 were females.

== Speciality ==
Samanamalai, a site of rock-cut monuments, is located at Kilakuyilkudi.

== Politics ==
Kilakuyilkudi is part of the Thiruparankundram Assembly constituency and the Virudhunagar Lok Sabha constituency.
