= Sengapadai =

- village
- Location in Tamil Nadu, India Sengapadai (India)
- Coordinates: 9.45°N 77.56°E
- Country: India
- State: Tamil Nadu
- District: Madurai
- Elevation: 12 m (39 ft)

Population (2001)
  - Total: 3,712

Languages
  - Official: Tamil
- Time zone: UTC+5:30 (IST)
- Postal code: 625704

Sengapadai is a village 30 km (19 mi) southwest of Madurai city and 10 km southwest of Thirumangalam. The village was created by Koon Pandiyan, a Pandiya King, created the village as a military base on the banks of Gundar River, a distributary of River Vaigai. During an earlier period, the village was known as Sengol Padai (English: Military of Throne) which later became Sengapadai.

== Geography ==
Sengapadai is located in Tamil Nadu on the banks of Gundar River, a distributary of river Vaigai. The average elevation of Sengapadai is 12 m (39 ft).

This village forms a panchayat and falls under the administrative control of the district of Madurai, the taluk of Thirumangalam, and the panchayat union of Kallikudi, with a postal code of 625704 and an STD code of 04549.

== History ==
Koon Pandiyan established a military base on the banks of Gundar River, and this place was called Sengol Padai. Later, it came to be known as Sengappadai. This is the popular knowledge in the village.

This village is not mentioned in Tamil literature, however, there are two old temples in the village which speak to its history. The temple in the west is Sennakesava Perumal Koil and the one in the east is Sidhi Vinayakar Koil which was constructed in the era of Pandiya kings. The earliest Vinayaka temple, at the centre of the village, was defaced by the Malik Kafur invasion; this temple is known as Mottai Pillaiyar Koil, due to its broken head.

== Demographics ==
As of 2001, Sengapadai had a population of 3,712: 1,859 males and 1.853 females. Sengapadai had an average literacy rate of 65%, higher than the national average of 63.5%. 10% of the population was under 6 years of age. According to the 2011 census, Sengapadai population increased to 3,924 with 1,977 males and 1,947 females. The literacy rate also increased, to 69%.

== Language ==
Tamil is spoken predominantly in Sengapadai.

== Religion ==
At the moment, all residents in this village are Hindus. However, in the past, there were Christian missionaries in the village. Many Hindu Temples are located throughout the village.

== Production ==
=== Agriculture ===
Almost all the lands within Sengapadai's geographical limits are cultivatable. Nearly 60% of families are farmers. Cotton is the main product, but farmers also produce grains, nuts, cattle feed, sun flower seeds and many vegetables. Paddy is not produced as there is no storage pond available, which is necessary for flood irrigation of the paddy crop.

=== Weaving ===
Nearly 5% of families weave cloth, mainly cotton, on handlooms.

=== Service ===
The portion of the population that are not farmers, are engaged in government- or privately owned services.

In 2009–10, under the Anna Marumalarchi Thittam, a state-funded development project, a library was created in a new building and contains thousand of books on history, literature, fiction and other subjects.

Two public bathing cubicles for men were constructed under a panchayat project in the year 2008–09. Bathing rooms for women have not yet been built.

=== Poultry and dairy farms ===
A few poultry farms produce eggs and chickens. Dairy farms supply barely-sufficient milk for local consumption.

=== Industry ===
There are no industries in Sengapadai. The Government of Tamil Nadu plans to establish a SIDCO (Small Industries) Complex. However, this development was heavily opposed by the local farmers in 2008 because it could result in the loss of many trees and agricultural activities.

=== Solar Power ===
Kamuthi Solar Power Project - A 648 MW solar power station was inaugurated in 2016

== Living standards ==
Many villagers are in the middle income group; almost all are above the poverty level. Still there are concepts of Castism among the older generation.

The village has excellent water distribution and a drainage network, but sanitation facilities are poor. Waste management has to be implemented by the Government. Items such as plastic, glass and metals are dumped along with biodegradable wastes in the farming lands. This severely affects the yields from these lands.

The few private clinics are run by Paramedics.

== Postal, telegraphy, telephone and Internet services ==
There is a village post office in Sengapadai, which also serves the nearby villages in collecting and distributing. Families have wired telephone and internet facilities provided by BSNL, and almost all young people own a cell phone.

== Transport ==
=== Road ===
Sengapadai is connected by paved roads in the south (towards Villur), east (towards Karisalkalampatti, Sivarakottai and Kalligudi), west (towards T. Pudupatti) and north (towards Madurai). The primary traffic lies to Thirumangalam and Madurai. State government-operated buses are the main source of transportation for most people. Apart from city buses, three-wheeled, black and yellow auto-rickshaws, referred to as autos, are used to reach this village from Thirumangalam.
