= S. S. Viswanatha Das =

Indian playwright and freedom fighter (1886–1940)

- Born: Dasari; 16 June 1886; Sivakasi, Madras Presidency, British India (now Tamil Nadu, India)
- Died: 31 December 1940 (aged 54); Madras, Madras Province, British India (now Chennai, Tamil Nadu, India)
- Occupations: Playwright, actor
- Known for: advocating for Indian independence through his art
- Political party: Indian National Congress

Viswanatha Das (16 June 1886 – 31 December 1940) was an Indian playwright, actor, and participant in the Indian independence movement. He is noted for incorporating nationalist themes into his theatrical productions and promoting Indian independence through art.

== Life ==
Das was born on 16 June 1886 in Sivakasi as the eldest son of Subramaniam and Jnanambal, who named him Dasari. Raised in Thirumangalam, he developed an early interest in devotional music and acting. His first performance came at the age of eight.

In 1911, after meeting Mahatma Gandhi in Thoothukudi, Das incorporated khadi into his performances, with characters in his productions wearing khadi garments as a symbol of the Swadeshi movement. Das used his theater work as a medium to advocate for Indian independence. One such song sung by Das was "Kokku Parakuthadi Paapa", which referred to the British as cranes that flew all the way from the banks of the Thames to loot India. His plays, which included depictions of figures like Lord Muruga and Harischandra, were infused with messages opposing British rule. For instance, Valli (in Valli Thirumanam) would drive away the flocks of birds that came to feed off the corn, singing: ‘From somewhere, you have come here to exploit India’.

The 1919 Jallianwala Bagh massacre profoundly influenced Das. He wrote and performed the song "Punjab Massacre is the Most Horrible Act on the Earth" (பஞ்சாப் படுகொலை பாரில் கொடியது), which gained prominence in protests and rallies. His activities attracted the attention of British authorities, leading to frequent arrests and legal challenges. Despite these obstacles, Das continued his theatrical and political activism, founding the Shanmuganandam Art Group, which performed in various regions, including Southeast Asia.

Throughout his career Das faced significant personal and financial difficulties due to his involvement in the independence movement. He pledged his home in Thirumangalam to manage legal expenses and rejected offers from British authorities to perform plays supporting their regime in exchange for financial relief.

In 1936 Das traveled with Jawaharlal Nehru to British Ceylon (now Sri Lanka) but was denied entry by British officials, who considered him a security risk. Locally, he contributed to political efforts as a member of the Tirumangalam taluk Congress Committee in the Madurai District.

Das died on 31 December 1940 while performing the play Valli Kalyanam in the now defunct Royal Theatre in Madras (now Chennai). He collapsed on stage during the performance, dressed as Lord Muruga and passed away.

== Memorial ==
In recognition of his contributions, the Government of Tamil Nadu established the 'Thiyagi Viswanatha Das Memorial' in Thirumangalam, Madurai. The memorial features a bust of Das, a library, and an exhibition hall commemorating his work and legacy.
