= Sholavandan railway station =

Railway station in Tamil Nadu, India

General information
- Coordinates: 10.0228°N 77.9654°E

Construction
- Structure type: At grade

Other information
- Station code: SDN

Passengers
- 2022–23: 200,936 (per year); 551 (per day)
Location
- Location within India Location within Tamil Nadu

Sholavandan railway station (station code: SDN) is an NSG–5 category Indian railway station in Madurai railway division of Southern Railway zone. It serves Sholavandan, located in Madurai district of the Indian state of Tamil Nadu.

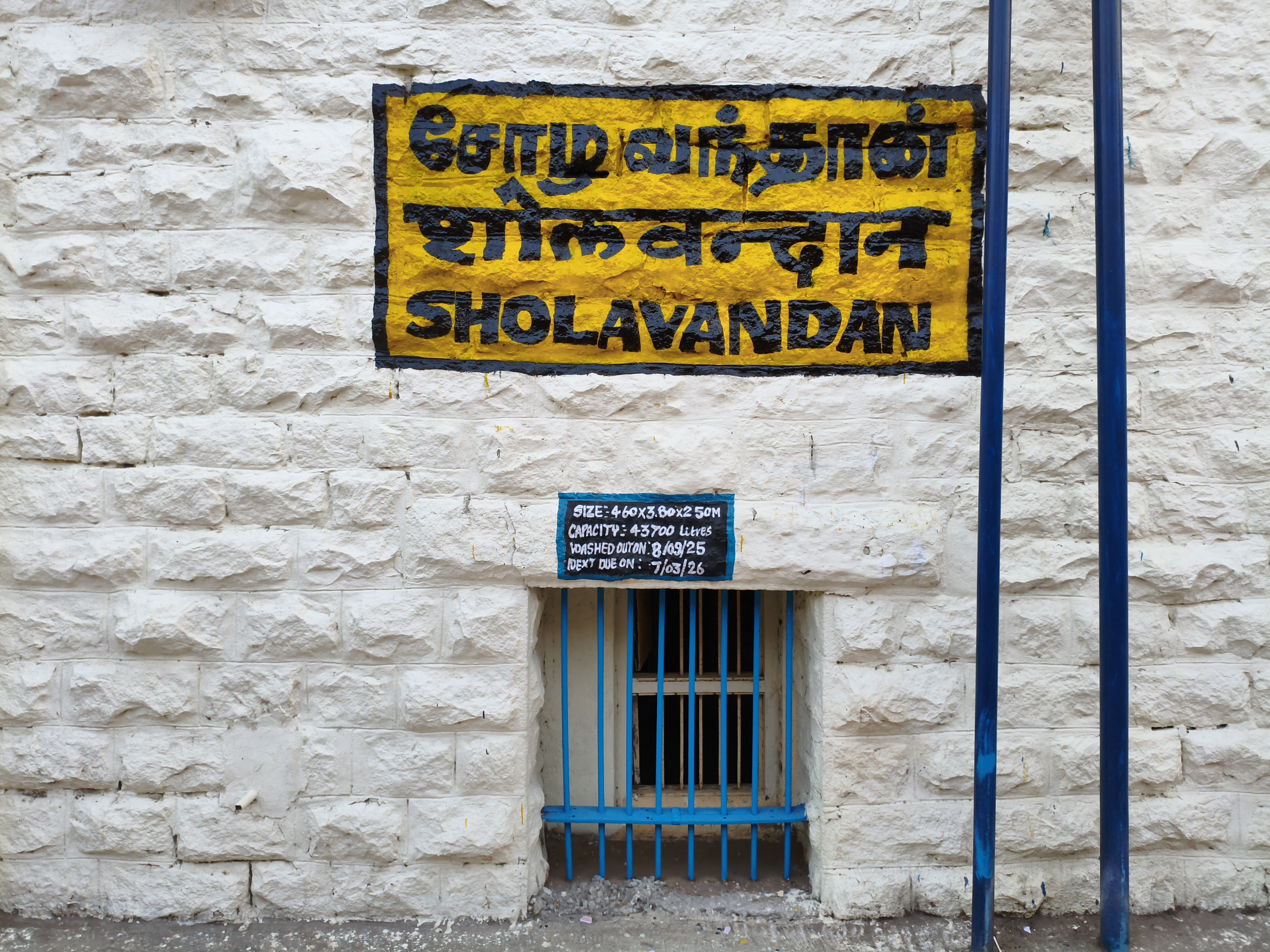
Sholavandan railway station name display

== Location and layout ==
Sholavandan is located on the left bank of the Vaigai River, sixteen miles north-west of Madurai. Sholavandan railway station is a stop for all passenger trains on the Madurai–Bangalore Express and the Nellai Express. It follows Samayanallur station on the route to Dindigul from Madurai.

== Lines ==
The station has two intersecting lines: The BG single line towards the north via Chennai and Bangalore and the BG single line towards the south via Madurai and Kanyakumari.

== Performance and earnings ==
For the FY 2022–23, the annual earnings of the station was ₹11,994,331 (US$120,000) and daily earnings was ₹32,861 (US$340). For the same financial year, the annual passenger count was 200,936 and daily count was 551. While, the footfall per day was recorded as 867.

== Projects and development ==
It is one of the 73 stations in Tamil Nadu to be named for upgradation under Amrit Bharat Station Scheme of Indian Railways.

== See also ==
- List of railway stations in India
