= Vadakampatti =

- village
- Interactive map of Vadakampatti
- Coordinates: 9°42′35″N 77°57′06″E
- Country: India
- State: Tamil Nadu
- District: Madurai

Languages
  - Official: Tamil
- Time zone: UTC+5:30 (IST)
- PIN: 625708

Vadakampatti is a small village near Kalligudi, a small town in Tirumangalam Taluk of Madurai district in the Indian state of Tamil Nadu. It is located 18 km from Tirumangalam.

This village is known for the cult of God Muniyandi, basically known as caretaker of the village and its people. Every year a grand festival is organised by the village origin to worship the Muniyandi. People who are part of this village residing all over Tamil Nadu will come on third week of every January month and they pay their worship and respect to the renowned god Muniyandi. The family business for the people of village and its origin are running a hotel in the name of "Madurai Sri Muniyandi Vilas", a renowned non-vegetarian hotel famous in Tamil Nadu.
