= Edaganathar temple =

Edaganathar Temple
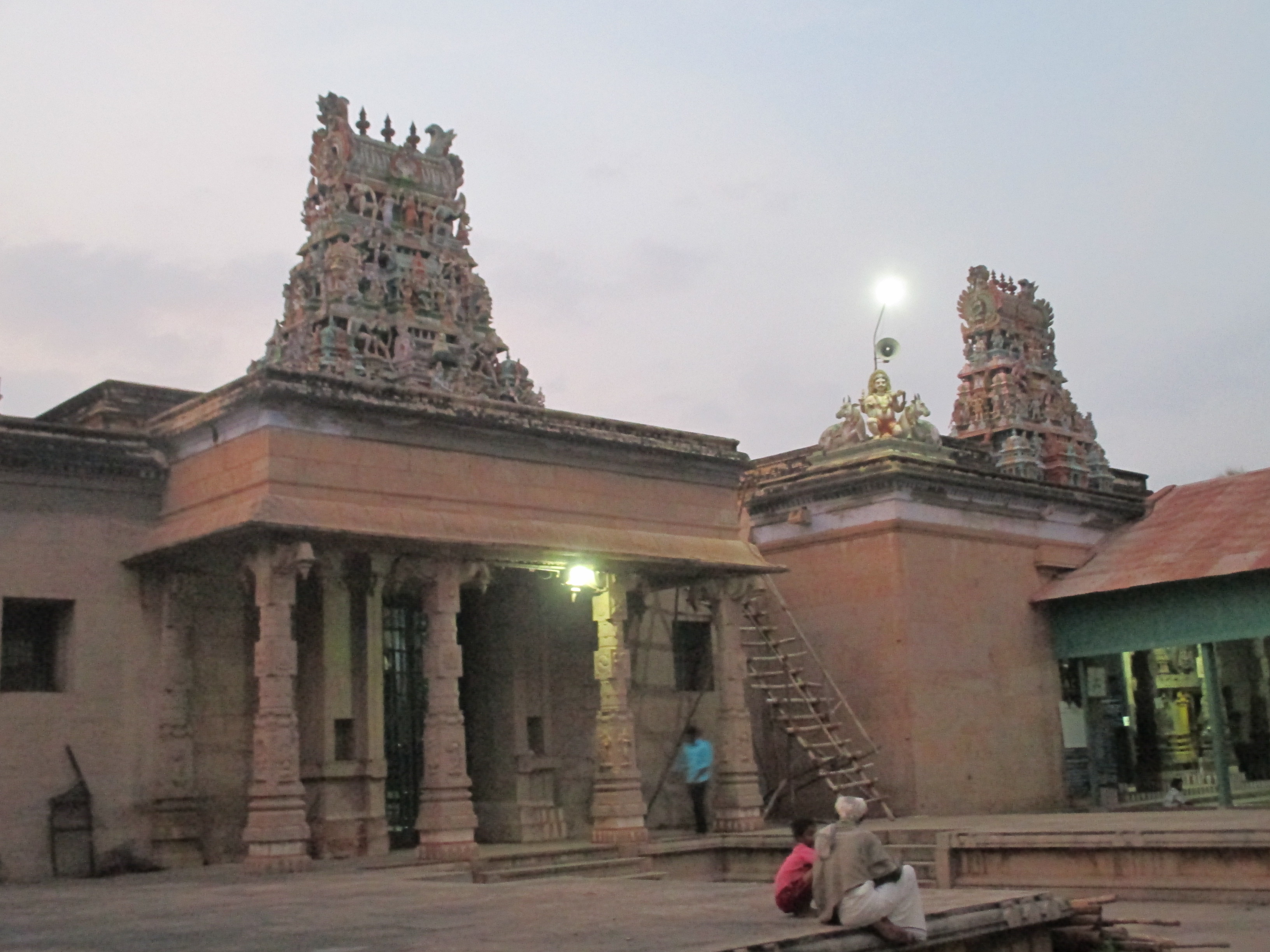

- Location in Tamil Nadu

Religion
- Affiliation: Hinduism
- District: Madurai
- Deity: Edaganathar (Shiva) Elavrkuzhali (Parvathi)

Location
- Location: Tiruvedagam
- State: Tamil Nadu
- Country: India
- Coordinates: 9.59°N 77.59°E

Architecture
- Type: Dravidian architecture

Edaganathar Temple (ஏடகநாதர் கோயில்) is a Hindu temple dedicated to the deity Shiva, in Thiruvedagam, a village in Madurai district in the Indian state of Tamil Nadu. The temple is located on the banks of Vaigai River. Shiva is worshipped as Edaganathar, and is represented by the lingam. His consort Parvati is depicted as Visalakshi. The presiding deity is mentioned in the 7th century Tamil Saiva canonical work, the Tevaram, written by Tamil saint poets known as the nayanars and classified as Paadal Petra Sthalam.

The temple complex covers five acres and it houses two gateway towers known as gopurams, each facing the Edaganathar and Elavrkuzhali shrine.

The original complex is believed to have been built by Pandyan Empire, while the masonry structure was built during the Nayak during the 16th century. In modern times, the temple is maintained and administered by the Hindu Religious and Charitable Endowments Department of the Government of Tamil Nadu.

== Legend ==
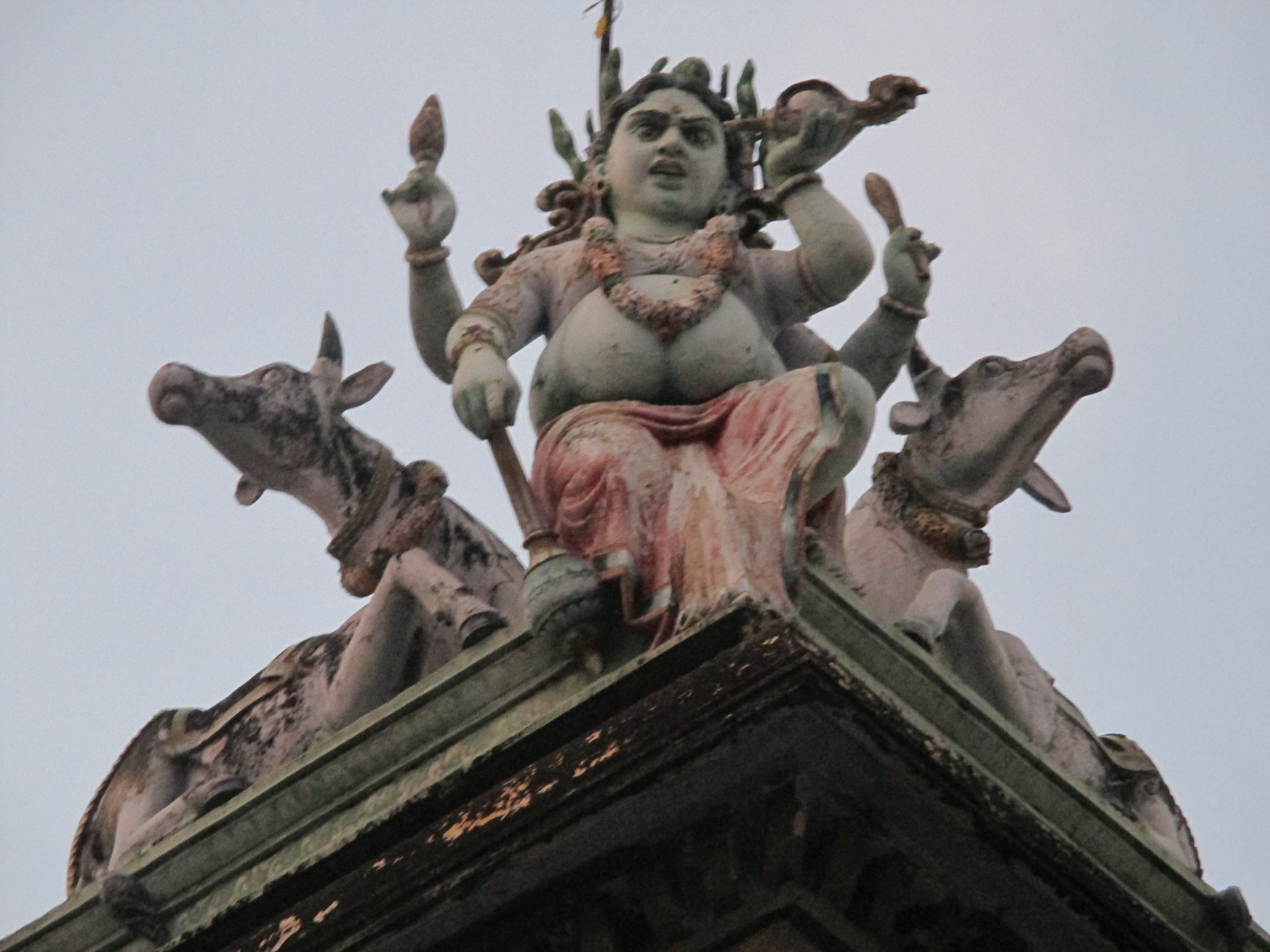
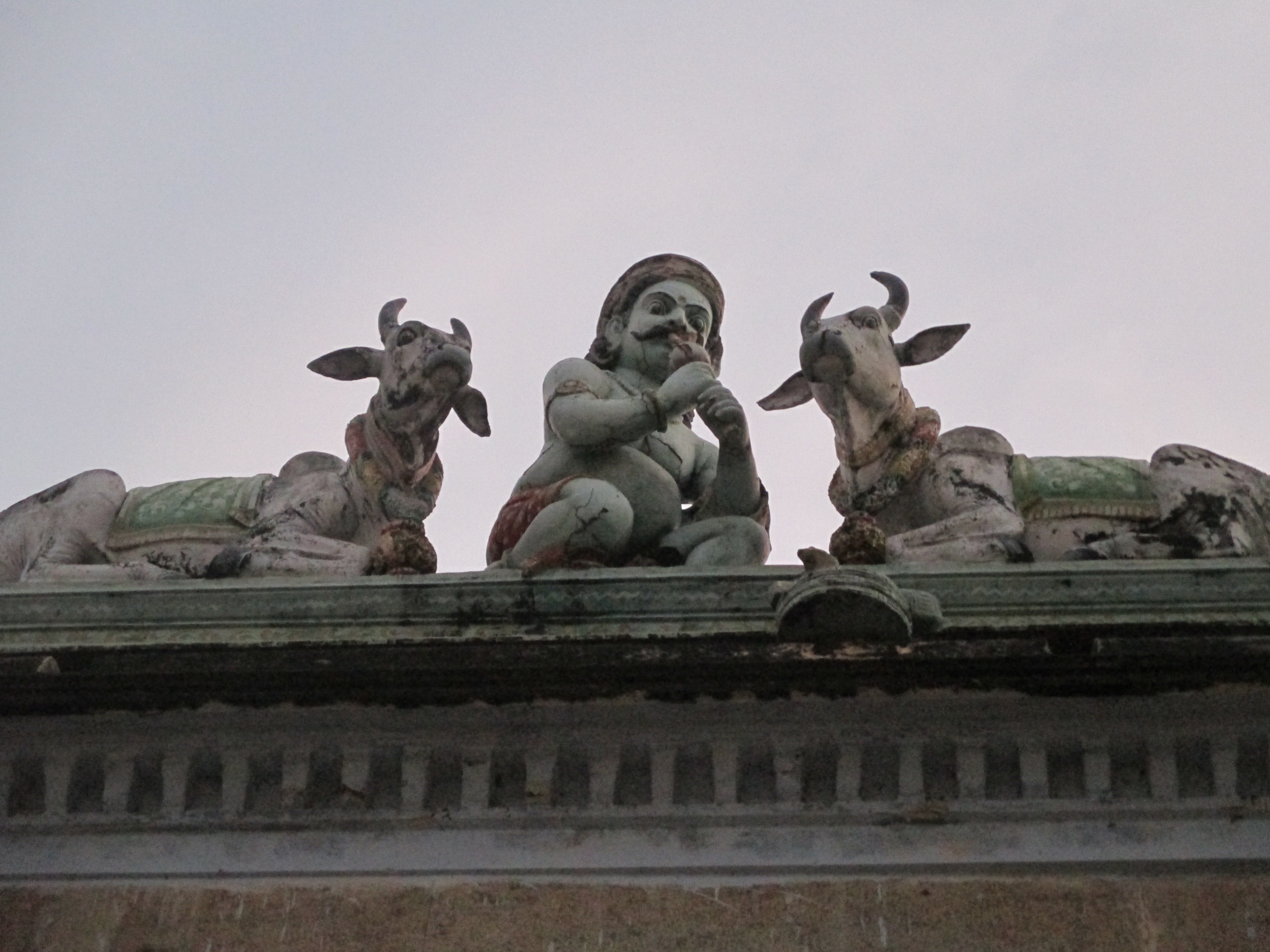
Images of the sculptures in the temple walls

As per Hindu legend, Jainism was the most prominent religion in the region. Sambandar challenged the Jainist scholars to compete against him. As per the rules of the competition, the scholars had to write their verses in palm leaf, float them in the river and the winner is decided when the leaf floated, while the lower work sunk. Sambandar's verses on a palm leaf (Edu) is said to have gone against the current of Vaigai and settled here, as opposed to the leaf floated by the once dominant Jains here, hence the name Tiruvedakam. It is believed that Shiva appeared at the place as Eduganathar, the one who let the leaf float.

== Architecture ==
The temple is located on the Madurai – cholavandan bus route and the nearest railway station is cholavandan. The present structure with spacious corridors and imposing gopurams occupies an area of about 5 acres (20,000 m^{2}). Images related to Sambandars episode are seen carved on the stone steps leading to the Vaikai river. The presiding deity lord shiva is called as Edakanatheswarar and the Ambal his consort mother Parvathy is called as Elavaarkuzhali, Sugandha Kundalambika. The sthala vriksham is Vilvam(Aegle marmelos) and the Theertham is called Bhrama Theertham. Inscriptions from the period of Jatavarman Kulasekhara Pandyan (12th century AD), and Krishna Deva Raya are seen in this temple, speaking of their endowments to this shrine. As per tradition, a Pandyan queen wanted Sambandar to reconvert the king Arikesari Nedumaran to Saivism from his Jain beliefs. Sambandar accepted the plea of the queen and influenced the king to convert to Saivism. It is also believed that the king slew around 8,000 Jains in his kingdom. The stone carvings in the temple narrate the tradition.

== Religious practises and literary mention ==
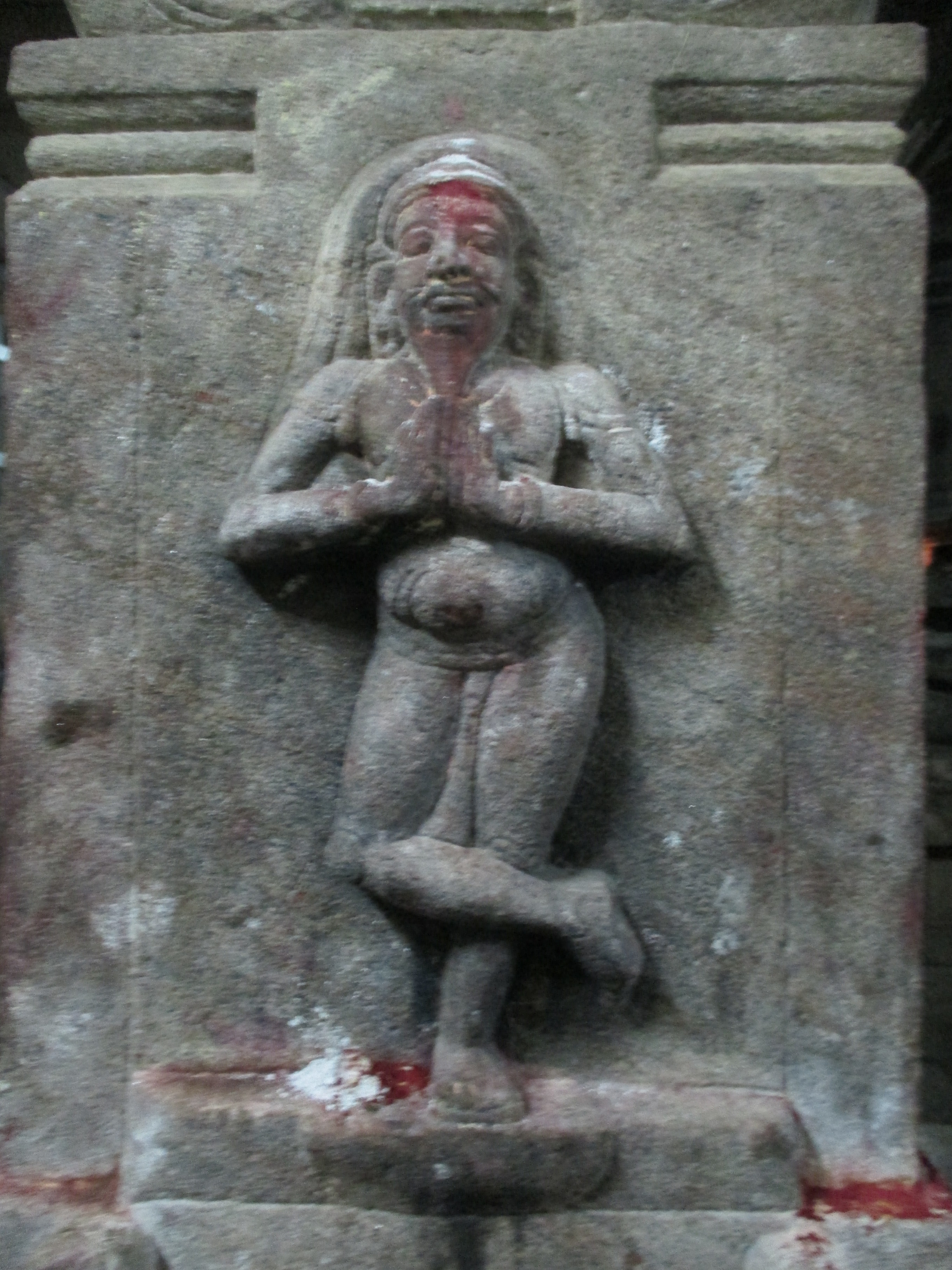
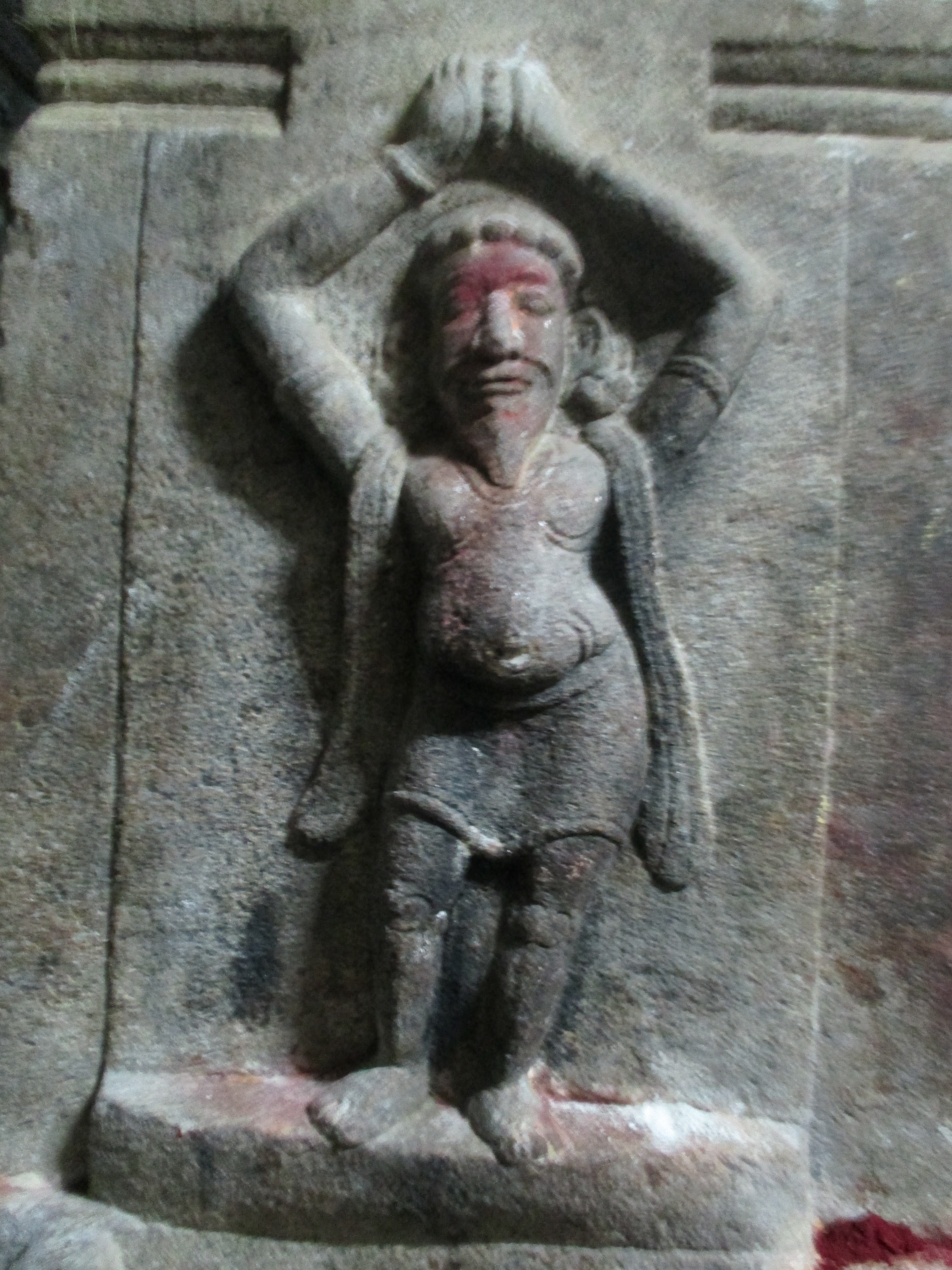
Images of the sculptures in the temple pillar

During the Edu Ethireriya Utsavam, the act of Sambandar is reenacted in the temple. Sankabisheka, performed during Karthikai (November – December) is considered very sacred in the region.

It is one of the shrines of the 275 Paadal Petra Sthalams – Shiva Sthalams glorified in the early medieval Tevaram poems by Tamil Saivite Nayanar Sambandar. Thirupugazh, the work of Arunagirinathar, a 13th-century saint glorifies the temple.
