= List of colleges and institutes in Madurai district =

This is a list of the colleges and institutes in Madurai district.

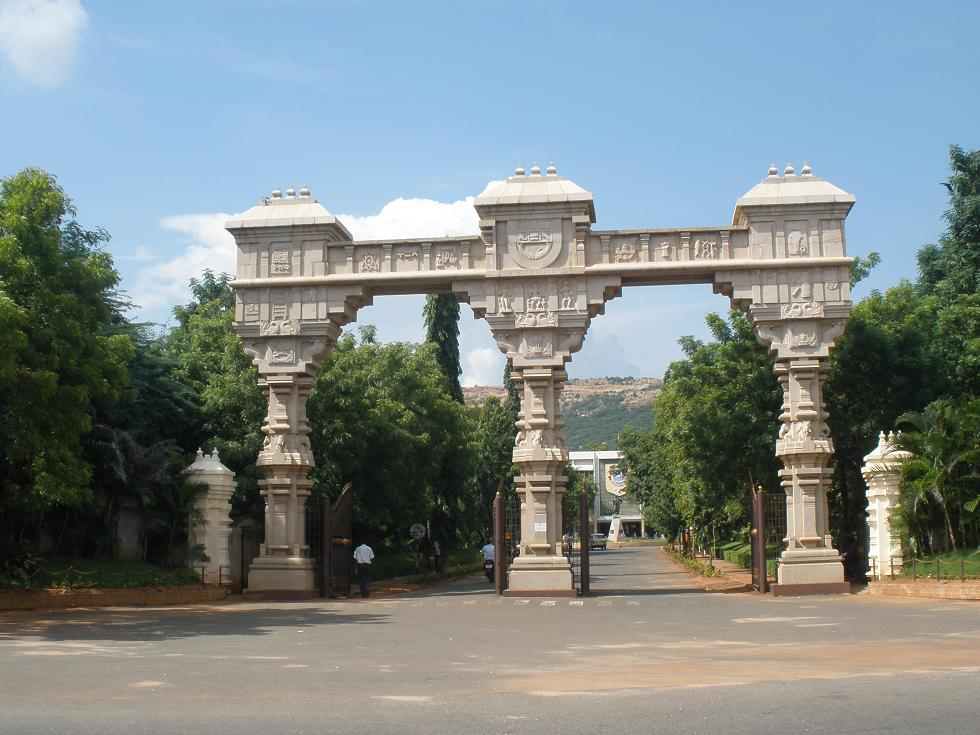
Entrance of Madurai Kamarajar University

Madurai has been an academic centre of learning of Tamil culture, literature, art, music and dance for centuries. All three assemblies of the Tamil language, the Tamil Sangam (about the 3rd century BC to the 3rd century CE), were held at Madurai. The American College in Madurai is the oldest college in the city and second-oldest college in Tamil Nadu, established in 1881 by American Christian missionaries. The Lady Doak college, established in 1948, is the oldest women's college in Madurai. The Madura College (established in 1889), Fatima College (established in 1953) and M.S.S. Wakf Board College (established in 1964) are among the oldest educational institutions of the city. Vivekananda College, Tiruvedakam West, established in 1971, is the only residential college run in the gurukula pattern of education. Madurai Kamaraj University (originally called Madurai University), established in 1966, is the state run university that has 109 affiliated arts and science colleges in Madurai and neighbouring districts. There are 47 approved institutions of the university in and around the city consisting of autonomous colleges, aided colleges, self-financing colleges, constituent colleges, evening colleges and other approved institutions. There are seven polytechnics and five industrial training institutes in Madurai, with the Government Industrial Training Institute and the Government Polytechnic for Women being the most prominent. Fire and Safety Training Provided by Ideal industrial Training Institute Located in Krihsnapuram colony, The government institutes, namely, the Madurai Medical College and the Homoeopathic Medical College, along with the 11 paramedical institutes constitute the medical and paramedical paradigm of Madurai. There are seven engineering colleges in Madurai affiliated to Anna University, with the Thiagarajar College of Engineering being the oldest of all. The Madurai Law College, established in 1979, is one of the seven government law colleges in the state, administered by the Tamil Nadu Government Department of Legal Studies, and affiliated to the Tamil Nadu Dr. Ambedkar Law University. There are three teacher training institutes, two music colleges, three management institutes and 30 Arts & Science colleges in Madurai. The agricultural college and research institute in Madurai, started in 1965, by the state government provides agricultural education to aspirants in the southern districts of Tamil Nadu. There are a total of 369 primary, secondary and higher secondary schools in the city.

== Medical colleges ==
- Madurai Medical College
- Homoeopathic Medical College, Madurai
- Meenakshi Mission Hospital & Research Centre
- CSI Jeyaraj Annapackiam College of Nursing, Pasumalai
- CSI College of Dental Sciences and Research, East Veli Street
- Vadamalayan Institute Of Medical And Allied Health Sciences, Chinna Chokikulam
- Velammal Medical College and Hospital
- Preethi Institute of Medical Sciences & Research (PIMS)
- Preethi Paramedical Institute
- Lakshmana Paramedical Institute

== Engineering colleges ==
- Thiagarajar College of Engineering
- Central Institute of Plastics Engineering & Technology (CIPET), Madurai
- K. L. N. College of Engineering
- Solamalai College of Engineering / Raja College of Engineering and Technology
- SACS MAVMM Engineering College
- Velammal College of Engineering and Technology
- ST.Michael College of Engineering and Technology
- PTR College of Engineering
- Vickram College of Engineering
- Vaigai College of Engineering
- Ultra College of Engineering and Technology
- Fatima Michael College of Engineering and Technology
- Mangayarkarasi College of Engineering and Technology
- SRM Madurai College of Engineering and Technology

== Arts and Science Colleges ==
- Auxilium Arts and Science College for Women, Chittampatti, Madurai
- Thiagarajar College
- Lady Doak College
- Arul Anandar College, Karumathur
- E.M.G. Yadava Women's College
- Madurai School of Management
- Nadar Mahajana Sangam S. Vellaichamy Nadar College, Nagamalai
- The American College in Madurai
- The Madura College
- Ambiga College of Arts and Science for Women, Madurai
- Yadava College, Thirupalai
- PKN Arts and Science College, Thirumangalam
- Vivekananda College, Madurai
- Ultra Arts and Science College, Othakadai
- Nagarathinam Angalammal Arts and Science College, Perungudi
- Saraswati Narayanan Arts and Science College, Perungudi
- Senthamarai Arts and Science College, Vadapalnji
- Lathamathavan Arts and Science College, Kidaripatti
- KLN Arts and Science College, Pottapalayam
- Pasumpon Muthuramalinga Thevar College, Usilampatti
- Madurai Kamaraj University Evening College, Tallakulam
- Madurai Institute of Social Sciences
- Sourashtra College, Pasumalai

== Polytechnics and catering colleges ==
- Government Polytechnic for Women
- Tamil Nadu Polytechnic College
- Government Polytechnic College, Chekkanurani
- Leela Institute of Hotel Management and catering
- Gesto Hotel management college
- Alffa Catering College

== ITI colleges ==
- Tamil Nadu Government ITI, Pudhur
- Tamil Nadu Women ITI, Pudhur
- Tamil Nadu Government ITI, Chekkanoorni
- Loyola Private ITI, GnanaOlivuPuram
- Ideal ITI, Krishnapuram Colony
- CSI ITI, Pasumalai
- Uypa ITI, Thirunagar
- Venkateshwara ITI, Thanakkankulam
- Gms Gavmm Alagar Kovli 2019To2022←Set→ Nanga Tha Gethu Alagar Kovli Nanga Tha———

== Schools ==
- Ambika Matriculation School
- American College Higher Secondary School
- Arbindo Mira Intranational School
- C. S. Ramachary Memorial Matriculation Higher Secondary School
- Capron Hall Girls Higher Secondary School
- CEOA CBSE School
- CEOA Matriculation Higher Secondary School
- Crown Matriculation Higher Secondary School, Goripalayam
- Delhi World Public School
- Dolphin CBSE School
- Government Higher Secondary School, Thiruparankundram
- Holy Family Girls Higher Secondary School
- Indira Gandhi Memorial Matriculation Higher Secondary School
- Kendriya Vidyalaya, Narimedu
- Kendriya Vidyalaya, Thirupparankundram
- KVT Matriculation Higher Secondary School, Madurai
- Lakshmi School, Karuppayoorani
- Le Chatelier Matriculation Higher Secondary School
- M.N.U.Jayaraj Nadar Higher Secondary School, Nagamalai Pudhukottai
- Madura College Higher Secondary School
- Maharishi Vidhyaa Mandhir CBSE School, Thanakkankulam
- Maharishi Vidhyaa Mandir CBSE School, Kovilpapakudi
- Mahatma Montessori Matriculation Higher Secondary School
- Mangayarkarasi Higher Secondary School
- Muthuthevar Mukkalathor Higher Secondary School, Thirunagar
- Nadar Higher Secondary School
- Nirmala Girls Higher Secondary School
- Pasumalai CSI Boys Higher secondary school
- Queen Mira Intranational School
- Railway Mixed Higher Secondary School
- S.B.O.A. Matriculation Hr. Sec. School
- S.P.J Matriculation School
- Saracens Matriculation Higher secondary school
- Savithabhai Higher Secondary School
- Seethalaksmi Girls Higher Secondary School
- Sethupati Higher Secondary School
- Sethurajan Matriculaction Higher Secondary School, Madurai
- Sourashtra Boys Higher Secondary School
- Sourashtra Girls Higher Secondary School
- Sri Vidhyalayam Matriculation Higher Secondary School
- St. Britto Boys Higher Secondary School
- St. Joseph's Girls Higher Secondary School, Chinthamani
- St. Mary's Boys Higher Secondary School, Chinthamani
- TVS Matriculation Higher Secondary School
- Thiagaraja Model Higher Secondary School, Teppakulam
- Thiagarajar Higher Secondary School, Andalpuram
- Triveni School, Ponnagaram
- Union Christian Higher Secondary School
- V.H.N. Higher Secondary School, Chinthamani
- V.M.J ICSE School, Chinthamani
- Velammal Matriculation Higher Secondary School
- Vikaasa School, Ponnagaram
