= Jnanananda Bharati =

Jnanananda Bharati (1889–1975), also spelled Gnanananda Bharati, was a Sanyasi, lawyer, philosopher, writer and author. Born as Krishnaswamy Iyer to Vakil G. Ramachandra Iyer and Janaki Ammal on 26 October 1889, Krishnaswamy passed his BA, MA and BL degrees at the University of Madras and practiced as a successful lawyer at Tirunelveli.

== Family ==
His father Ramachandra Iyer took Sanyasa in 1922 with the name of "Ramananda Saraswathi" in the presence of Sringeri Jagadguru Sri Chandrashekhara Bharati Mahaswamigal at Sringeri. He spent his last days in Kolli hills near [Namakkal] where his Samadhi is located near Viswambal Samudram.

== Books ==
Sri Jnanananda Bharathi Swamigal was a scholar in Tamil and Sanskrit and had command over English and had written more than 80 books on Advaita Philosophy and on Jagadgurus of Sringeri Mutt. (Note: For example: The Eternal Law, Stray thoughts on Dharma, Outlines of Vedanta, English Translation of Panchadasi, the Great Equation, an Introduction to Vedanta, Viveka Choodamani, A peep into Advaita, Dialogues with the Guru, Sparks from the Divine Anvil etc., in English (about 44 books), Panchadasi and Vivekachoodamani, Neethimanjari, Valmiki Hridayam in Tamil (about 33 books), and about 10 books (e.g. Sangrahaavali etc.) in Sanskrit) His religious and philosophical articles were published in The Hindu, Bhavan's journal, Kalyana Kalpataru, Sankara Krupa etc., and his books were published by reputed publishers like Chetna Publications, Bombay, Geetha Press, Gorakhpur, Vani Vilas Press, Srirangam etc. He was a regular contributor to the book review section of the Hindu, where he specialized in reviewing Hindu religious and philosophical books. He voluntarily stopped practicing as a lawyer, retiring at 60 to spread the message of Vedanta among the general population. He had researched various ancient manuscripts available at the Sringeri Mutt and brought to light important ancient works.

== Sanyasa and samadhi ==
On 3 November 1966, he took Sanyasa in the presence of Jagadguru Sri Abhinava Vidya Tirtha Mahaswamigal of Sringeri, at Brindavan on the banks of river Yamuna, UP, and was given the Sanyasa Ashrama name Jnanananda Bharathi. He attained Samadhi at Mannadimangalam, near Sholavandan, Madurai District, Tamil Nadu, on 9 April 1975.
