= Mannadimangalam =

Neighbourhood in Madurai district, Tamil Nadu, India

Mannadimangalam is a village located in Vadipatti, near Kuruvithurai, Madurai district, Tamil Nadu, India.

It is located approximately 7 kilometres south-west of Vadipatti and is classified as a gram panchayat. The 2011 census recorded a population of 7,259 people.

There is a Perumal Temple on the west side of the Agraharam Road, paambalamman temple backside of Agraharam and Meenakshi Amman Temple near the Vaigai River bank. There are numerous other temples within and around Mannadimangalam village.

There is also an Adhistanam of Sri Jnanananda Bharathi Swamigal in Mannadimangalam. Sri Sringeri Jagadgurus blessed the villagers with a Lingam to be installed at the Adhistanam of Sri Jnanananda Bharathi Swamigal. Daily pooja is being performed at the Adhistanam and annual rituals like Jayanthi and Aradhana are also being celebrated.
