= Kuruvithurai Chitra Ratha Vallabha Perumal Temple =

Hindu temple in Madurai district, Tamil Nadu, India

- Chitra Ratha Vallabha Perumal Temple, Kuruvithurai, Madurai, Tamil Nadu

Religion
- Affiliation: Hinduism
- District: Madurai
- Deity: Chitra Ratha Vallabha Perumal
- Festivals: Vaikuntha Ekadashi, Krishna Janmashtami

Location
- Location: Kuruvithurai
- State: Tamil Nadu
- Country: India
- Coordinates: 10.070364°N 77.896548°E

Architecture
- Type: Dravidian architecture

Specifications
- Temple: One
- Elevation: 214.77 m (705 ft)

Chitra Ratha Vallabha Perumal Temple which is maintained under the control of Hindu Religious and Charitable Endowments Department, Government of Tamil Nadu is a Perumal temple situated at Kuruvithurai. The main deity in this temple Chitra Ratha Vallabha Perumal, who appears here with His consorts Shri Devi and Boo Devi. The idols of main deity and His consorts are made up of sandalwood which is a rare feature in this temple.

== Location ==
This temple is located with the coordinates of (10.070364°N 77.896548°E) at Kuruvithurai neighbourhood in Madurai district of Tamil Nadu state in India.

Kuruvithurai Chitra Ratha Vallabha Perumal Temple (Tamil Nadu)

== Mythical belief ==
Guru (Jupiter) constructed a place in Kuruvithurai for his son Kasa. But Kasa had been trapped in demon's world. Guru performed penance on Perumal and pleased by his penance, Perumal appeared before him with a chariot (ratha) in Kuruvithurai and saved his son from demon's world. So this temple is known as 'Chitra Ratha Vallabha Perumal Temple'.

== Inscriptions ==
A stone inscription was found in this temple which mentioned king Parakrama Pandian (1097 - 1104 A.D.) renovated the check dam in Kuruvithurai, with the conversion of brick and mortar structure into stone barrage which lasts long.

== Theft ==
The idols of Lord Perumal, Lord Panchamurth, Goddess Sridevi and Goddess Boodevi were stolen by thieves and later abandoned on roadside and recovered back safely.

== Guru peyarchi ==
Every year, on account of 'Guru peyarchi' (the forward movement of Jupiter from one zodiac to another), people throng this temple situated on the banks of Vaigai River at Kuruvithurai.
