= Maittanpatti =

- village
- Location in Tamil Nadu, India
- Coordinates: 9.40°N 77.57°E
- Country: India
- State: Tamil Nadu
- District: Madurai

Government
  - Type: Village Panchayat
- Elevation: 109 m (358 ft)

Population (2011)
  - Total: 1,629

Languages
  - Official: Tamil
- Time zone: UTC+5:30 (IST)
- PIN: 625701
- Telephone code: 04549
- Nearest city: Madurai

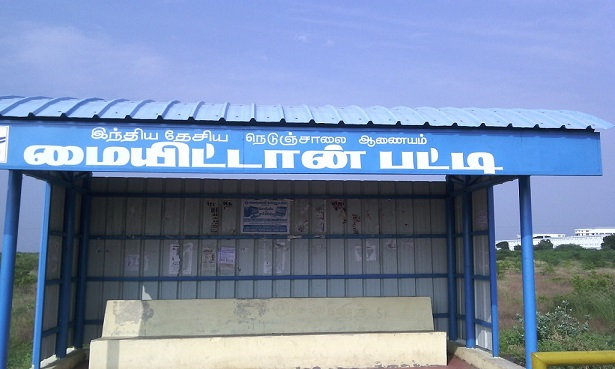
Maittanpatti Bus Stop in NH7

Maittanpatti is a small village in Kalligudi taluk of Madurai district in the Indian state of Tamil Naduat latitude i9°40’ N and longitude 77°57’E, around 6 km (3.7 mi) from Kalligudi.

In the 2011 census Maittanpatti had a population of 1,629 with a sex-ratio of 823 females to 806 males.
