= Vivekananda College, Madurai =

- Location: India
- Website: vivekanandacollege.ac.in

Vivekananda College is a men-only autonomous college of arts and sciences in Thiruvedagam in Madurai district affiliated to Madurai Kamaraj University. It was founded in 1971 by Swami Chidbhavanada and is managed by Ramakrishna Tapovanam. It is the only registered Gurukula Institute of Life Training in India. The National Assessment and Accreditation Council has given 'A+' grade (CGPA 3.33 out of 4.00) for the college when the college was re-accredited in 2023. It also has an Indira Gandhi National Open University (IGNOU) study centre. The students are encouraged to join Certificate Programmes and Degree Programmes offered by IGNOU.

The college has three daily prayers, compulsory physical activities like yoga and sports, and optional activities like Silambam and gymnastics.

Ramakrisha Tapovanam in Tiruvedagam West also manages Vivekananda Higher Secondary School and Narendra Nursery School in the same campus and Vivekananda Matriculation School in Sholavandan

== History ==
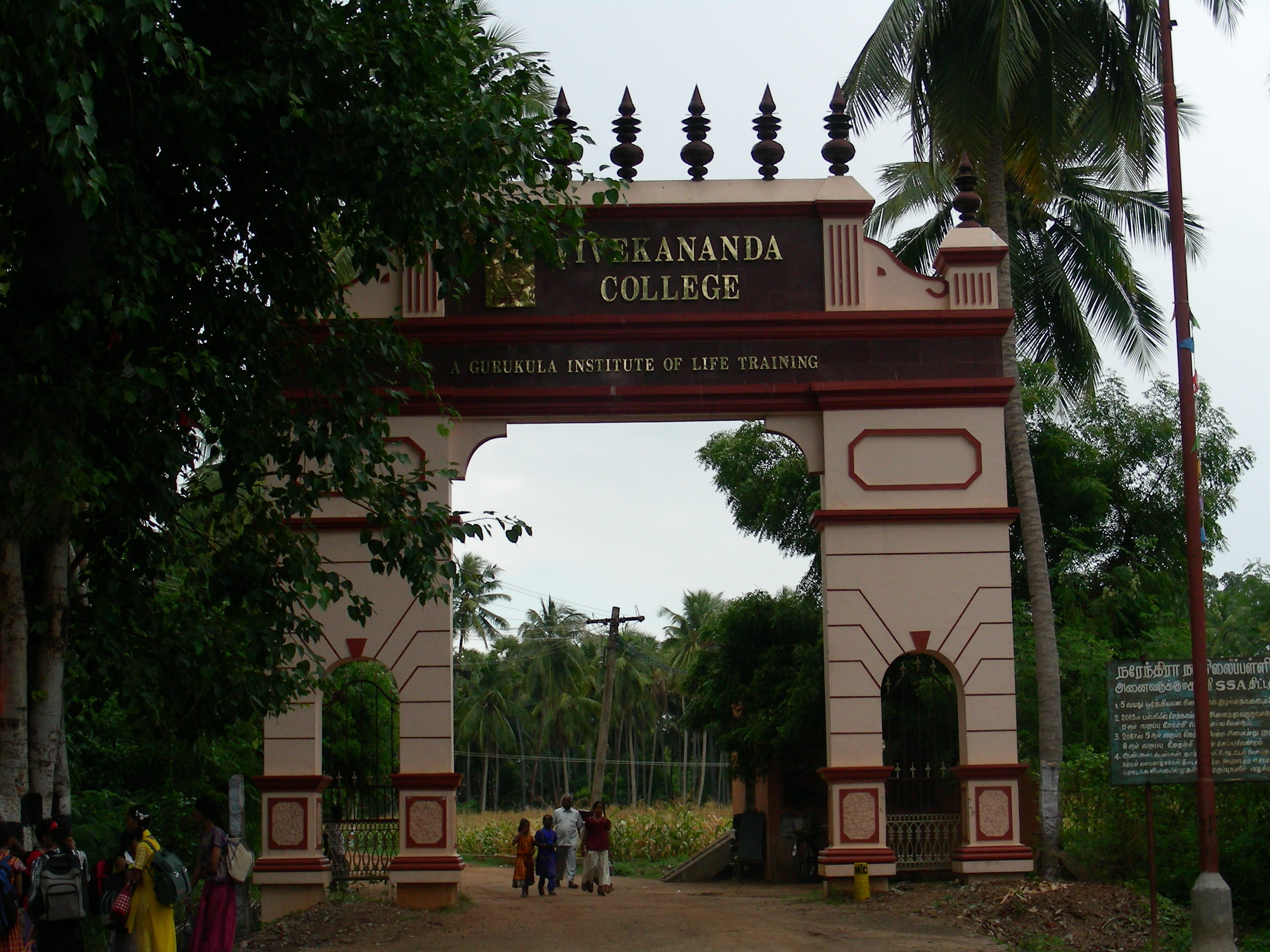
Welcome arch at the entrance to the college

The institute was established in 1971 and has been autonomy since 1987. It has been accredited with 'A+' Grade (CGPA 3.33 out of 4.00) by NAAC since 2023 valid up-to November 2028.

== Protecting the environment ==
Each student plants ten seedlings in his native place and ten seedlings in the villages around our Gurukulam. The students records the type of seedling planted and where, and measures its growth rate for eight months on a report card.

The student who plants the most tree seedlings is given an award.

== IGNOU Study Centre ==
Dr. M. Sendhilvelan of the Commerce Department was responsible for the establishment of the IGNOU Study Center. Dr. V. Parthasarathy of Zoology Department is the Coordinator of the Study Center. Students are encouraged to join courses offered by IGNOU. This year 161 regular students have joined the programmes offered by IGNOU.
