= Shri Pathirakali Mariamman Temple =

- ஸ்ரீ பத்திரகாளி மாரியம்மன் திருக்கோவில்
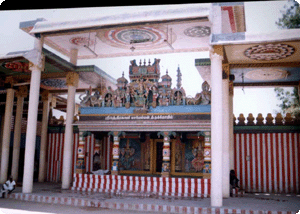

- Location in Tamil Nadu

Religion
- Affiliation: Hinduism
- District: Madurai
- Festival: Vaigasi Mahorchavam

Location
- Location: Tirumangalam
- State: Tamil Nadu
- Country: India
- Interactive map of Shri Pathirakali Mariamman Temple
- Coordinates: 9.81°N 77.98°E

Architecture
- Type: Dravidian
- Creator: Pandiyakula Kshatriya Nadar Uravinmurai
- Completed: 1852 onwards

Shri Pathirakali Mariamman Temple (Tamil: ஸ்ரீ பத்திரகாளி மாரியம்மன் திருக்கோவில்) is one of the oldest temples in Madurai district. The Thirumangalam city is known that the mangalyam for goddess Meenakshi of Madurai was designed and done here, so the name Tiru+Mangal(y)am came. In other way, it is said that when lord Murugan married Theivanai in Thiruparankundram (nearest to Tirumangalam), the "Tirumangalyam" was made here and hence the name came

The temple is located 20 kilometres (12 mi) south from Madurai in India. The main shrine would be Shri Mariamman and the Utsava Deity were Shri Pathirakaliamman and Shri Mariamman. The temple was built in 1852 onward by the Thirumangalam Pandiyakula Kshatriya Nadar Uravinmurai. Along with the Temple, they also organized an educational trust named PKN Vidhyasala with 9 Educational Institutions has provided education to thousands of people around the district since 1908.

== History ==
In the early 18th century, the Nadars were a community mostly engaged in the palmyra industry, including the production of toddy. However, there were a few subsects comprising wealthy landlords and money lenders. Although numerically dominant in the area, the Nadars had a minimal interaction with other communities and they were themselves divided by their various endogamous subcastes, and thus lacked communal cohesion. While the majority of the Nadar population of the region were poor, landless laborers. Due to their association with toddy, the Nadars were considered lower than other middle castes, but relatively higher than the low castes, and were also prohibited to enter temples built by higher ranked castes. And after the following years Nadar people in every region decided to build a temple and a grocery shops for themselves. Andso in Nadars of Thirumangalam have also decided to build a temple at the heart of the city and they started working for the basement.

And there, they founded a Goddess statue along with the some gods of Hindu mythology. They planned to establish a temple around there. They built a temple with the Dravidian Architecture and the Kumbabishegam was held. Then the temple extends with the Lord GopalaKrishnar, Lord Ahora Veerapathrar, Lord Natarajar, Lords Appar, Sundarar, Manickavasagar, Thirugnana Chambanthar, Thirunavukkarasar, Lord Chandikesuwarar and the Navagrahas. And the first Kumbabishegam was conducted in 1857. The temple was constructed and Managed by the Tirumangalam local people of Nadar community under the leadership of Pandiyakula Kshatriya Nadar Uravinmurai Trust.
