= Karisalkalampatti =

- Village
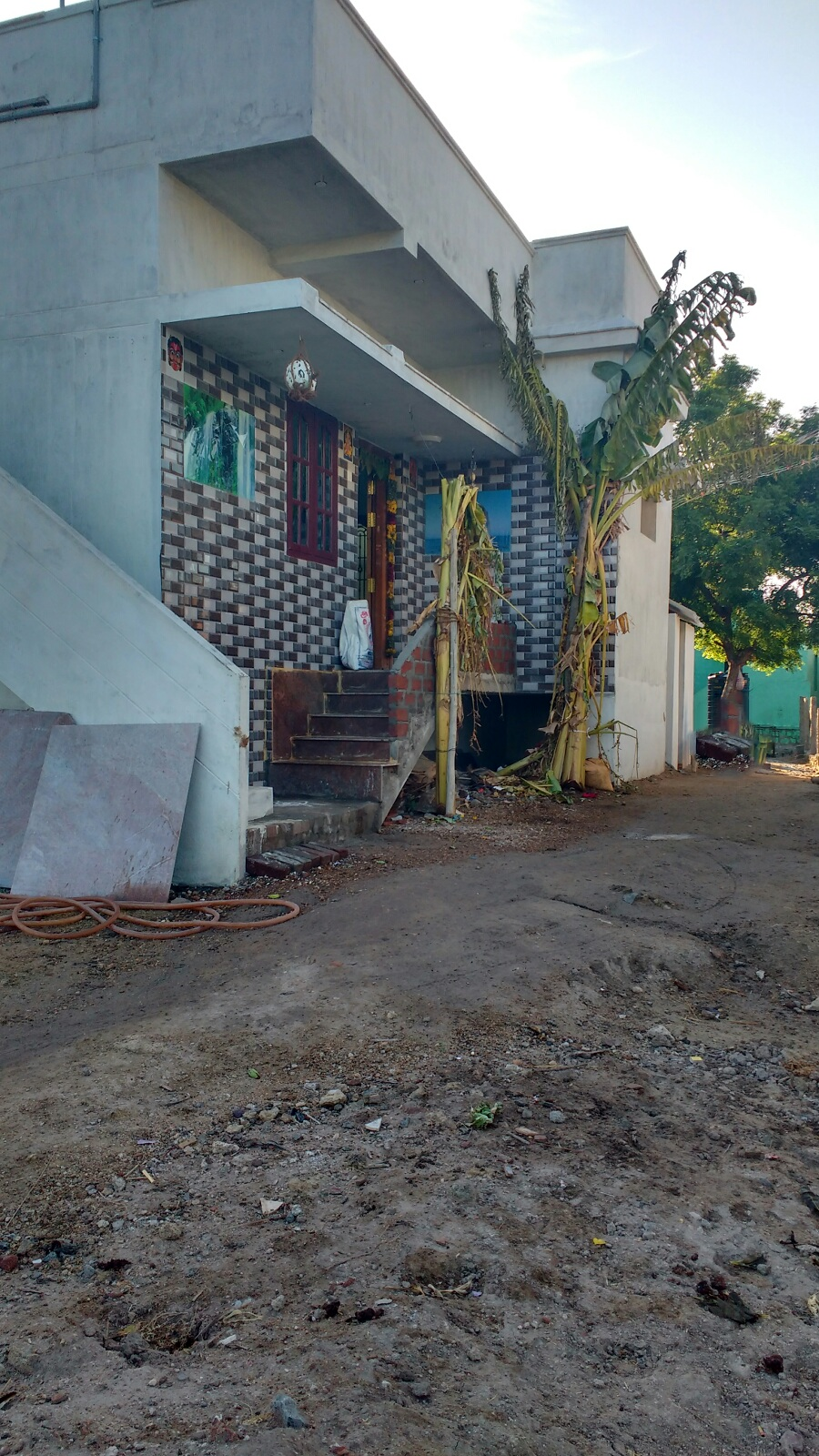
- Street View of Karisalkalampatti

- Location in Tamil Nadu, India
- Coordinates: 9.76°N 77.96°E
- Country: India
- State: Tamil Nadu
- District: Madurai

Area
  - Total: 6.22 km^{2} (2.40 sq mi)
- Elevation: 121 m (397 ft)

Population (2011)http://www.census2011.co.in/data/village/640973-karisalkalampatti-tamil-nadu.html
  - Total: 1,158
  - Density: 186/km^{2} (482/sq mi)

Languages
  - Official: Tamil
- Time zone: UTC+5:30 (IST)
- PIN: 625706
- Telephone code: 04549
- Vehicle registration: TN-58 Z
- Sex ratio: 50.86:49.14 ♂/♀
- Website: www.municipality.tn.gov.in/tirumangalam

Karisalkalampatti is a village in the Madurai District of the Indian state of Tamil Nadu. It is located about 9 km from Thirumangalam, 30 km from Madurai, and 520 km from the state capital, Chennai. As of the 2011 census, the village population was about 1,158.

== Geography ==
The altitude above mean sea level (MSL) is 121 m. This village is situated on the banks of river Gundar, a distributary of the river Vaigai. This village gets major rainfall during the south west monsoon period. The average annual rainfall received in the village is 40.95 cm. Karisalkalampatti is surrounded by Tirumangalam to the north, T.Kallupattito the west, Kariapattito the East, and Chellampatti to the South.

== Demographics ==
Religious census
Religion	Percent(%)
Hindu	99%
Christian	1%

According to the 2011 census, Karisalkalampatti had a population of 1158 people, of whom 589 were male and 569 female for a sex-ratio of 966 females for every 1,000 males. This is lower than the state average in Tamil Nadu which is 996. 142 were under the age of six. Schedule Castes numbered about 39 and there were no Scheduled Tribes. The average literacy of the village was 71.06%, compared to national average of 72.99%. The village had a total of 326 households. There were 683 workers, including 88 cultivators and 379 agricultural laborers. According to the religious census of 2011, Karisalkalampatti had 99% Hindus and 1% Christians.

== Politics ==
As per the constitution of India and the Panchyati Raaj Act, Karisalkalampatti village is administrated by a Sarpanch (Head of Village) who is an elected representative of village. Karisalkalampatti village falls under the Tirumangalam assembly constituency and the Virudhunagar (Lok Sabha constituency).

== Economy ==
Surrounding cultivated lands are the main places for the agricultural activities. Crops like cotton, rice, cholam, kambu, and green dal are cultivated here.

== Transportation ==
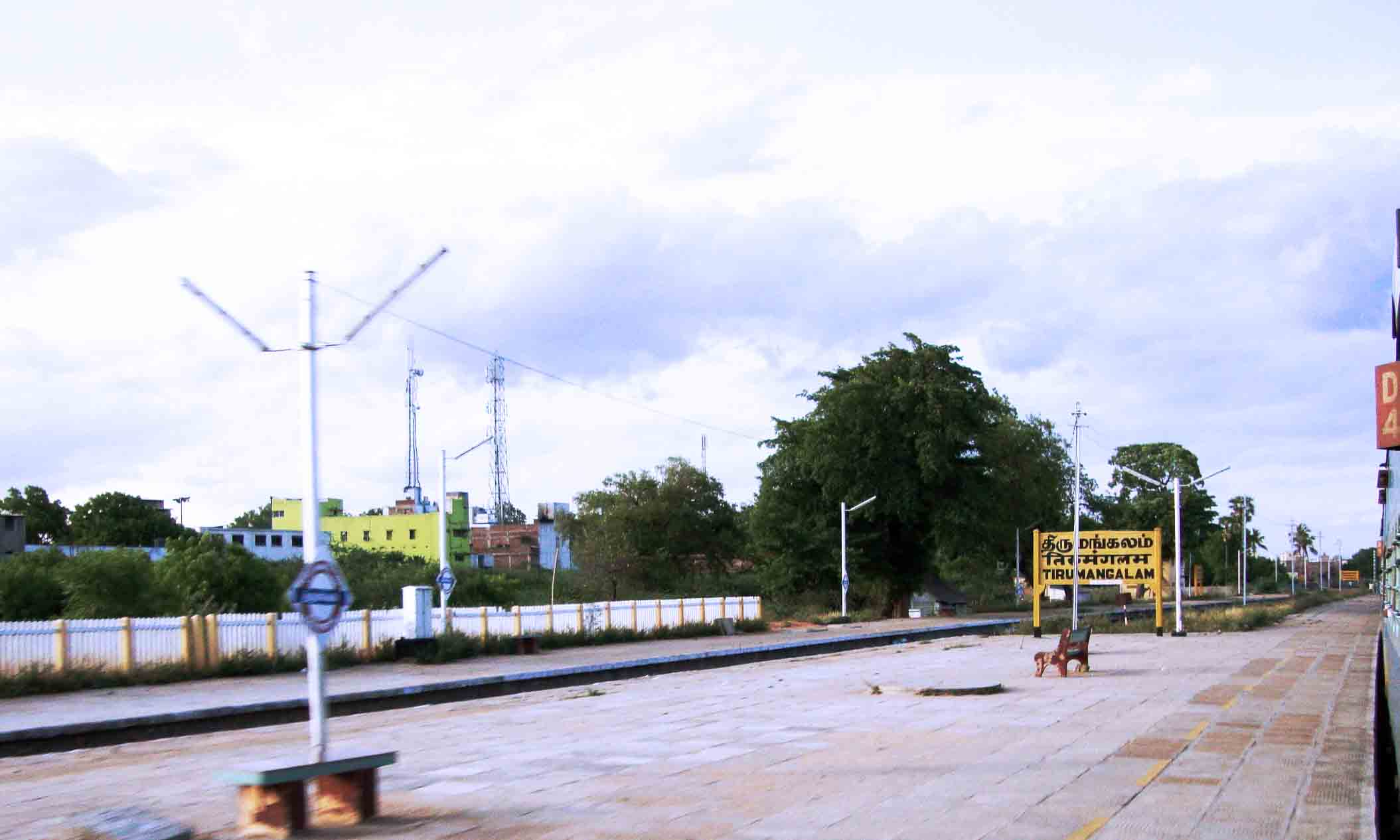
Thirumangalam Railway Station

Regular bus services are operated on a daily basis from Tirumangalam and Madurai. The nearest airport is Madurai International Airport located 15 km from the Village.

== Climate ==
Karisalkallampatti has a tropical wet and dry climate (Köppen: Aw). The hottest part of the year is late May to early June, known regionally as Agni Nakshatram ("fire star") or as Kathiri Veyyil, with maximum temperatures around 35–40 °C (95–104 °F). The coolest part of the year is January, with minimum temperatures around 19–25 °C (66–77 °F). The village gets most of its seasonal rainfall from the northeast monsoon winds, from mid–October to mid–December. Prevailing winds are usually southwesterly between April and October and north-easterly during the rest of the year. Historically, Karisalkalampatti has relied on the annual rains of the monsoon season to replenish water reservoirs, as no major rivers flow through the area.

Climate data for Karisalkallampatti
Month	Jan	Feb	Mar	Apr	May	Jun	Jul	Aug	Sep	Oct	Nov	Dec	Year
Mean daily maximum °C (°F)	33 (91)	35 (95)	38 (100)	40 (104)	41 (106)	39 (102)	38 (100)	37 (99)	37 (99)	35 (95)	33 (91)	31 (88)	41 (106)
Mean daily minimum °C (°F)	22 (72)	23 (73)	24 (75)	27 (81)	28 (82)	28 (82)	28 (82)	27 (81)	27 (81)	26 (79)	24 (75)	24 (75)	22 (72)
Average rainfall mm (inches)	10 (0.4)	10 (0.4)	10 (0.4)	24 (0.9)	30 (1.2)	39 (1.5)	60 (2.4)	91 (3.6)	102 (4.0)	190 (7.5)	130 (5.1)	60 (2.4)	756 (29.8)
Source: India Meteorological Department (temperatures and precipitation)
