= Paraithurainathar temple =

Hindu temple in Karur

Thirupparaitturai
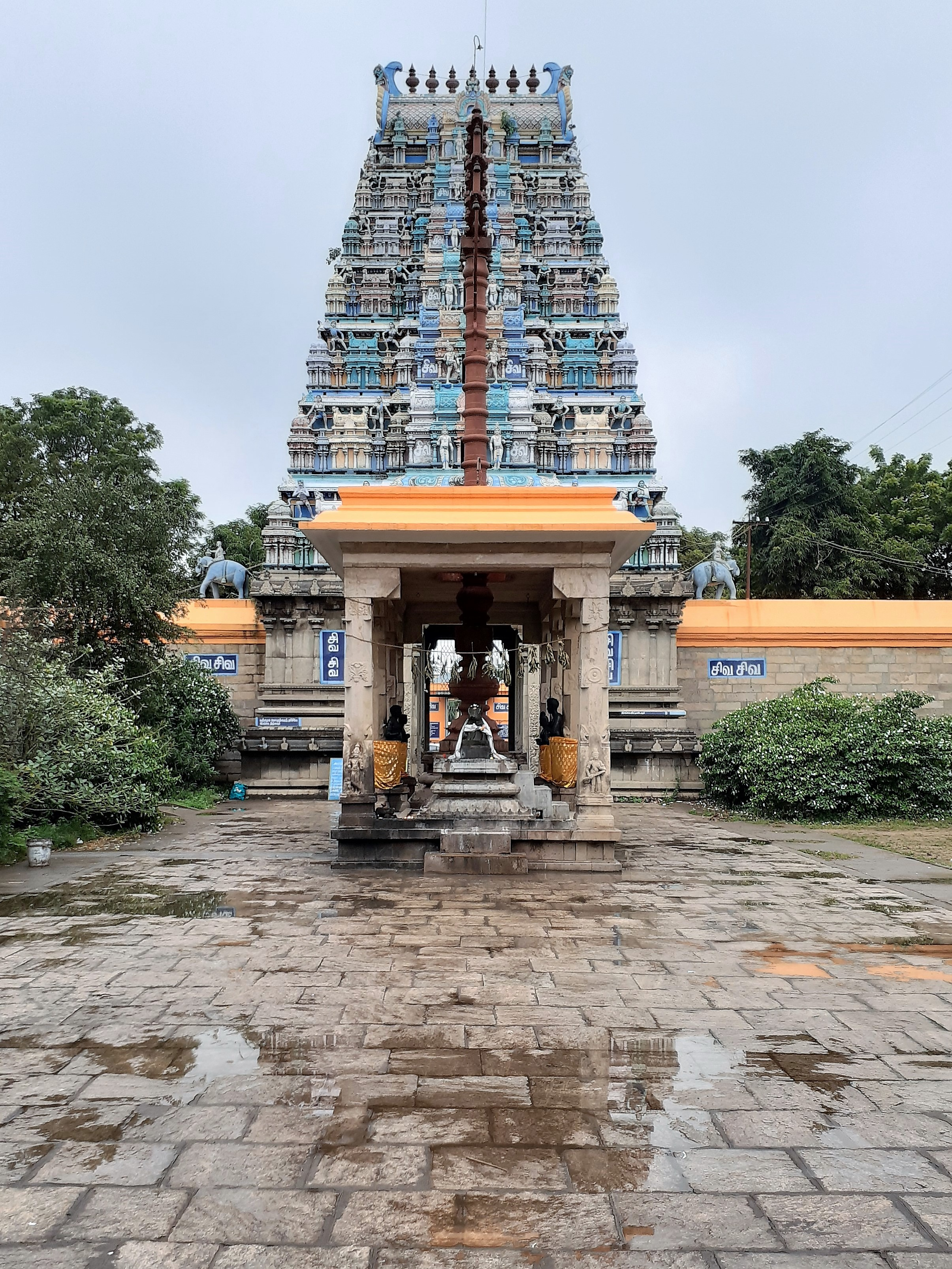
- Central tower of the temple

- Location in Tamil Nadu

Religion
- Affiliation: Hinduism
- District: Karur
- Deity: Tharugavaneswarar (Paraithurai Nather, Paraithruai Selvar)(Shiva) Pasumpon Mayeelambikai (Hema Varnambikai) (Parvati), Rajagopalan Swami
- Features: Temple tank: Parai Tree

Location
- Location: Tamil Nadu, India
- State: Tamil Nadu
- Country: India
- Coordinates: 10°52′41″N 78°33′47″E

Architecture
- Type: Dravidian architecture

The Paraithurainathar Temple is a Hindu temple in the town of Thirupparaithurai, Karur district of Tamil Nadu, India. The presiding deity Paraithurainathar, a form of Shiva, is revered in the Tevaram, written by the Tamil saint-poets known as the Nayanmars. The temple is classified as a Paadal Petra Sthalam. The temple gives its name to the village of Thirupparaithurai.

The temple is a part of the series of temples built by Cholas along the banks of river Kaveri. It has several inscriptions dating back to the Chola period. The temple has six daily rituals at various times from 6:00 a.m. to 8 p.m., and many yearly festivals on its calendar. The annual Brahmotsavam (prime festival) during Vaikasi (May–June) and Aippasi Thulastam are the major festivals of the temple. The temple is maintained and administered by the Hindu Religious and Endowment Board of the Government of Tamil Nadu.

== Legend ==
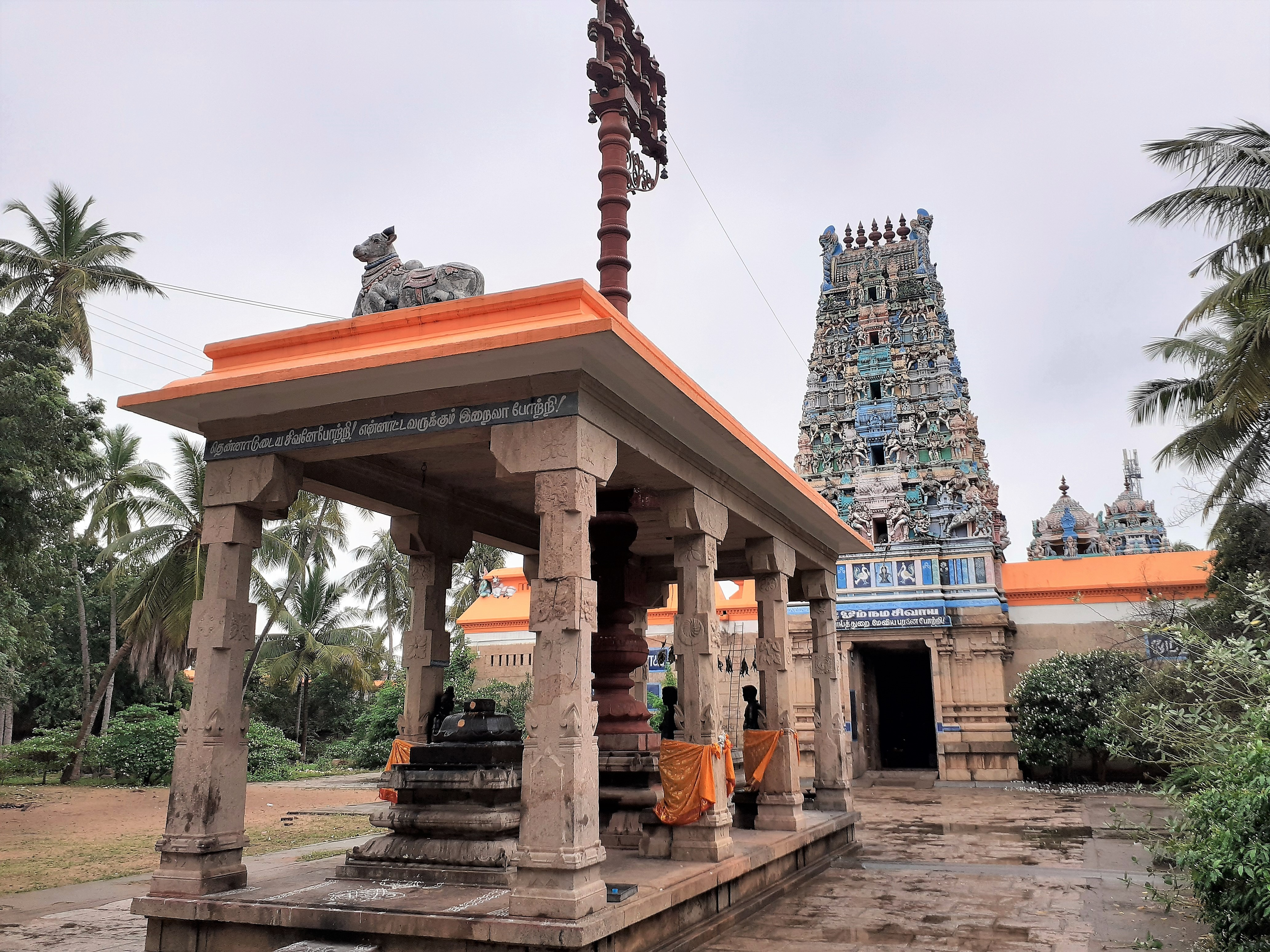
Paraithurainathar temple first precinct

According to regional legend, the sages of the Tharuka forest considered themselves to be superior to all beings. They also felt that they need not worship Shiva. The wives of the sages considered themselves to be the chastetest of all women. Shiva wanted to teach them a lesson. He appeared in the forest in his form of Bhikshatana, causing all the wives of the sages to become attracted towards him. Vishnu appeared in his female form of Mohini, causing the sages to become attracted towards her. Shiva and Vishnu appeared in their original forms. The sages realised their folly and repented. Since Shiva had appeared in the Tharuka forest, he came to be known as Paraithurainathar.

== Architecture ==
The temple is located in Thirupparaithurai, a village located 16 km from Trichy on the Trichy - Karur highway. The temple has a flat primary entrance tower which has the temple tank on the western side. The temple has a seven-tiered temple tower. The temple has two precincts. The sanctum is approached through the flag post, pillared halls, Ardhamandapam and mahamandapam. The sanctum houses the image of Tharukavaneswar in the form of Lingam (an iconic form of Shiva). There are shrines of Vinayagar, Murugan with Valli & Deivanai, Mahalakshmi and Vishnu Durgai. The images of Brahma, Lingodhbhavar and Dakshinamurthy are located in the planks around the sanctum. The sanctum is guarded by Dvarapalas and the images various deities are depicted in the nearby wall. In the halls in the first precinct, there are images of various Hindu deities. All the shrines of the temple are enclosed by large granite walls around both sanctums.

It is one of the shrines of the 275 Paadal Petra Sthalams.
