= Thirupparaithurai =

Thirupparaitturai is a village in the Srirangam taluk of Tiruchirappalli district in Tamil Nadu, India. It is situated on the south bank of the River Cauvery. Trichy-Coimbatore National Highway, Trichy-Palakkad Railway Line (Railway Station: Elamanur) have been laid through this village. It is 16 kilometers away from Trichy. The place is known for Paraithurainathar temple.

== History ==
The ancient Shiva Temple is at a bosom of this village. There were a lot of parai trees in ancient days. As parai trees had grown in abundance in this village in olden days this village is called Thiru "parai" thurai. This village is also a home to Shri Rajagopalan Swami. The 150 year old temple is adjacent to the Shiva temple.

== Boundary of the village ==
East : Elamanur West : Perugamani South: Analai North: The Holy River Cauvery

== Legends ==
Sri Ramakrishna Tapovanam founded by the Indian monk Swami Chidbhavananda and Sri Ramakrishna Kudil founded by Bramhachari Ramaswamy are institutions providing academic and spiritual education from this village.

== The Temple ==
Paraithurainathar temple is a Padal petra sthalam. The great Nayanars and ArunagiriNathar have sung in praise of the presiding deity of Thirupparaitturai temple.
