= Ammapet block =

Ammapet block is a revenue block in the Erode district of Tamil Nadu, India. It has a total of 20 panchayat villages.
