= Chellampatti, Madurai =

Neighbourhood in Madurai district, Tamil Nadu, India

Chellampatti
- town
- Location in Tamil Nadu, India Chellampatti (India)
- Coordinates: 09°56′39″N 077°53′53″E
- Country: India
- State: Tamil Nadu
- District: Madurai
- Taluka: Thirumangalam

Population
  - Total: 1,243

Languages
  - Official: Tamil
- Time zone: UTC+5:30 (IST)

Chellampatti is a village of usilampatti taluk, Madurai district, Tamil Nadu, India. The village is located on National Highway 85. Chellampatti is famous for its panchayat.

== Governance ==
Chellampatti is well known for its panchayat system. The Kallars had a unique character of ruling themselves with unwritten laws and regulations from time immemorial.

Chellampatti panchayat has five leaders: Parusa Pulli Thevar-I, Parusa Pulli Thevar-II, Nallu Thevar, Poosari Thevar and Kasalagara Thevar.
