= Chellampatti, Thanjavur =

Chellampatti
- neighbourhood
- Location in Tamil Nadu, India Chellampatti (India)
- Coordinates: 10°45′44″N 79°08′12″E
- Country: India
- State: Tamil Nadu
- District: Thanjavur
- Taluka: Thanjavur

Languages
  - Official: Tamil
- Time zone: UTC+5:30 (IST)
- PIN: 613403

Chellampatti was a suburb and is now a neighbourhood of the city of Thanjavur in Thanjavur taluk, Thanjavur district, Tamil Nadu, India. It is located in the southwestern part of the city.

== Governance ==
Chellampatti has been subsumed into the Thanjavur metropolitan area, and is under the Thanjavur City Corporation.
