= Chekkanurani =

- Neighbourhood
- Chekkanurani, Madurai (Tamil Nadu)
- Coordinates: 9.941100°N 77.971600°E
- Country: India
- State: Tamil Nadu
- District: Madurai district
- Elevation: 193 m (633 ft)

Languages
  - Official: Tamil, English
- Time zone: UTC+5:30 (IST)
- PIN: 625514
- Other Neighborhoods: Madurai, Palkalai Nagar, Virattipathu and Nagamalai
- Municipal body: Madurai Municipal Corporation
- District Collector: Dr. S. Aneesh Sekhar, I. A. S.
- LS: Virudhunagar Lok Sabha constituency
- VS: Thirumangalam Assembly constituency
- MP: Manickam Tagore
- MLA: R. B. Udhayakumar
- Website: https://madurai.nic.in

Chekkanurani is a neighbourhood in Madurai district of Tamil Nadu state in the peninsular India.

Chekkanurani is located at an altitude of 193 m above the mean sea level with the geographical coordinates of 9.941100°N 77.971600°E.

Chekkanurani has a Higher Secondary School viz., Keren Public School, from class Pre-KG to std. XII with 1,300 students totally. Also, a Government Polytechnic College, run by State Government of Tamil Nadu, is situated in Chekkanurani.

During the surface excavation of earth, in the month of December 2022, near Chekkanurani, a carved sculpture of Kottravai (old deity goddess) was found, which is assumed to be 1200 years old.
