= Chellampatti, Dharmapuri =

Chellampatti
- town
- Location in Tamil Nadu, India Chellampatti (India)
- Coordinates: 12°05′14″N 78°30′47″E
- Country: India
- State: Tamil Nadu
- District: Dharmapuri
- Taluka: Harur

Population (2011)
  - Total: 1,713

Languages
  - Official: Tamil
- Time zone: UTC+5:30 (IST)
- STD: 4256

Chellampatti is a village of Harur taluk, Dharmapuri district, Tamil Nadu, India.

== Demographics ==
As of 2001 India census, Chellampatti village had 1,245 inhabitants, with 639 males and 606 females.

In the 2011 census, Chellampatti village had 1,713 inhabitants.
