= Samayanallur =

Neighbourhood in Madurai district, Tamil Nadu, India

Coordinates: 9.9833°N 78.0333°E

Samayanallur is a small town located on National Highway 7, 12 kilometers from Madurai, Tamil Nadu, India. The main town just lies between the strip formed by the NH7 and Rail Track. On the south side is the river Vaigai and on the north side is Todaneri Lake ("Todaneri Kanmaai"). The main reason for bearing this name "Samayanallur" is due to its diversity in having all religion people staying together without any religious issues. To be more specific, "Samayam = religions" and "Nallur = life being good" together stands as Samayanallur. Samayanallur is where the conjoined road diverted to the next biggest towns called "Cholavandhan" and "Vadipatti". It is located near a village called 'Paravai'; the place being popular after a lady singer cum actress 'Paravai Muniammaa'. It is also situated near Thuvariman.

== Community ==
The majority of the people are Hindus, followed by Christians and Muslims. Though most of the previous generation people were focused on farming in this town, recently people do business or some other work in nearby cities around Madurai.

== Education ==
There is a Government higher secondary School. Colonized through British rule, the western influence in Samayanallur education brought forth western teachings of culture and history

Samayanallur also has St. Joseph's High School, a school that is going to celebrate its Platinum Jubilee. In the Center of the campus is the ancient Catholic Church built by French Jesuit missionaries. Many of the Alumni of the school are now Doctors, Lawyers, Engineers and Entrepreneurs.

== Festivals ==
The prominent festival of Samayanallur is Veeraiah Kovil Thiruvizha for 15 days celebration. It is celebrated once in four years subjected to the unity of various groups in the town. This festival is a week-long festival. It ends with famous "Valli Thirumana Nadagam" and "Arichandiran Nadagam".

== Politics ==
Solavandhan assembly constituency (SC) is a part of Theni (Lok Sabha constituency).

A. Venkatesan from DMK is the MLA for Sholavandan, which includes Samayanallur. O. P. Ravindranath Kumar, son of former Deputy CM O. Panneerselvam of AIADMK is the Member of Parliament, Lok Sabha, after his election in the 2019 Indian general election. Samayanallur is a village panchayat, governed by a village panchayat president, vice president and ward members.
