= Nagamalai =

- Neighbourhood
- Location within Tamil Nadu
- Coordinates: 9.9333°N 78.0461°E
- Country: India
- State: Tamil Nadu
- District: Madurai
- Elevation: 177.85 m (583.5 ft)

Languages
  - Official: Tamil, English
  - Speech: Tamil, English
- Time zone: UTC+5:30 (IST)
- Other Neighbourhoods: Vadapallhanchi, Kochadai, Palkalai Nagar

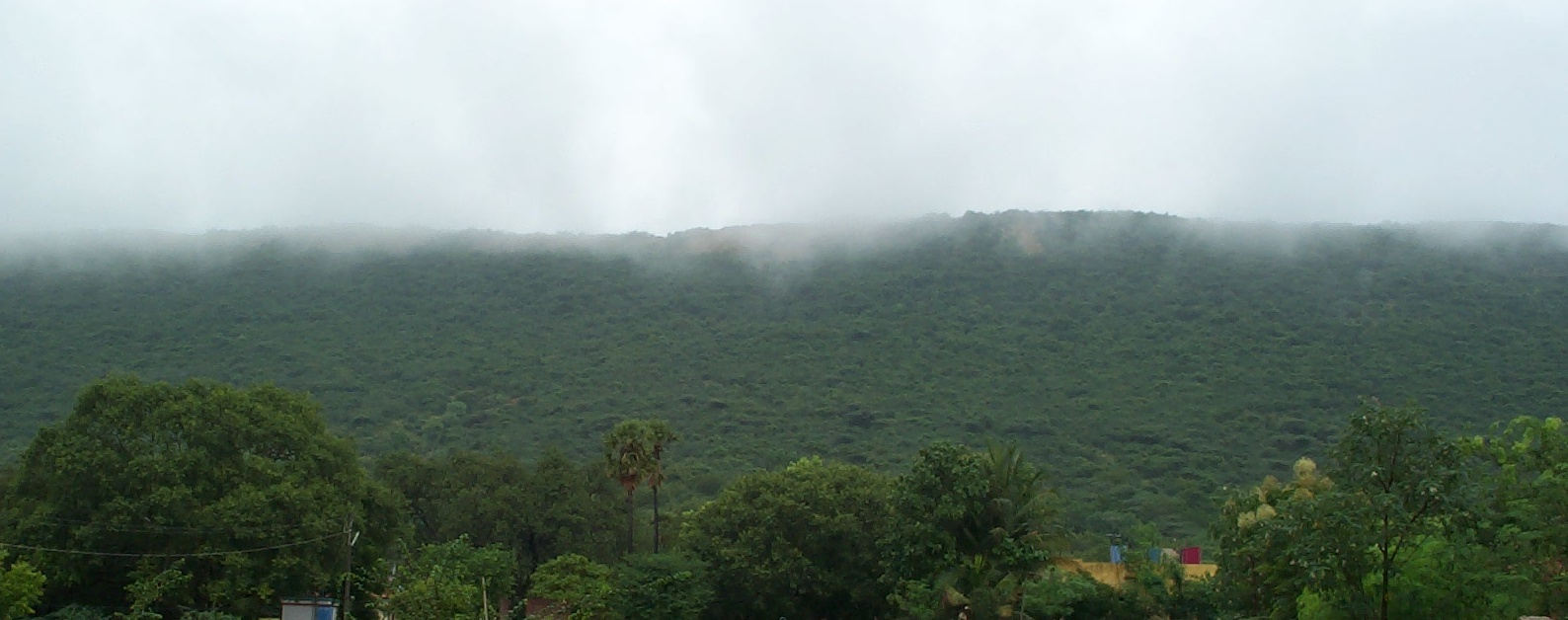
Nagamalai

Nagamalai ("naga"=snake, "malai"=hill) is a suburb of Madurai situated about 10 km west of Madurai City, Tamil Nadu, India, along the Madurai-Theni highway.

== Environment ==
=== Hills ===
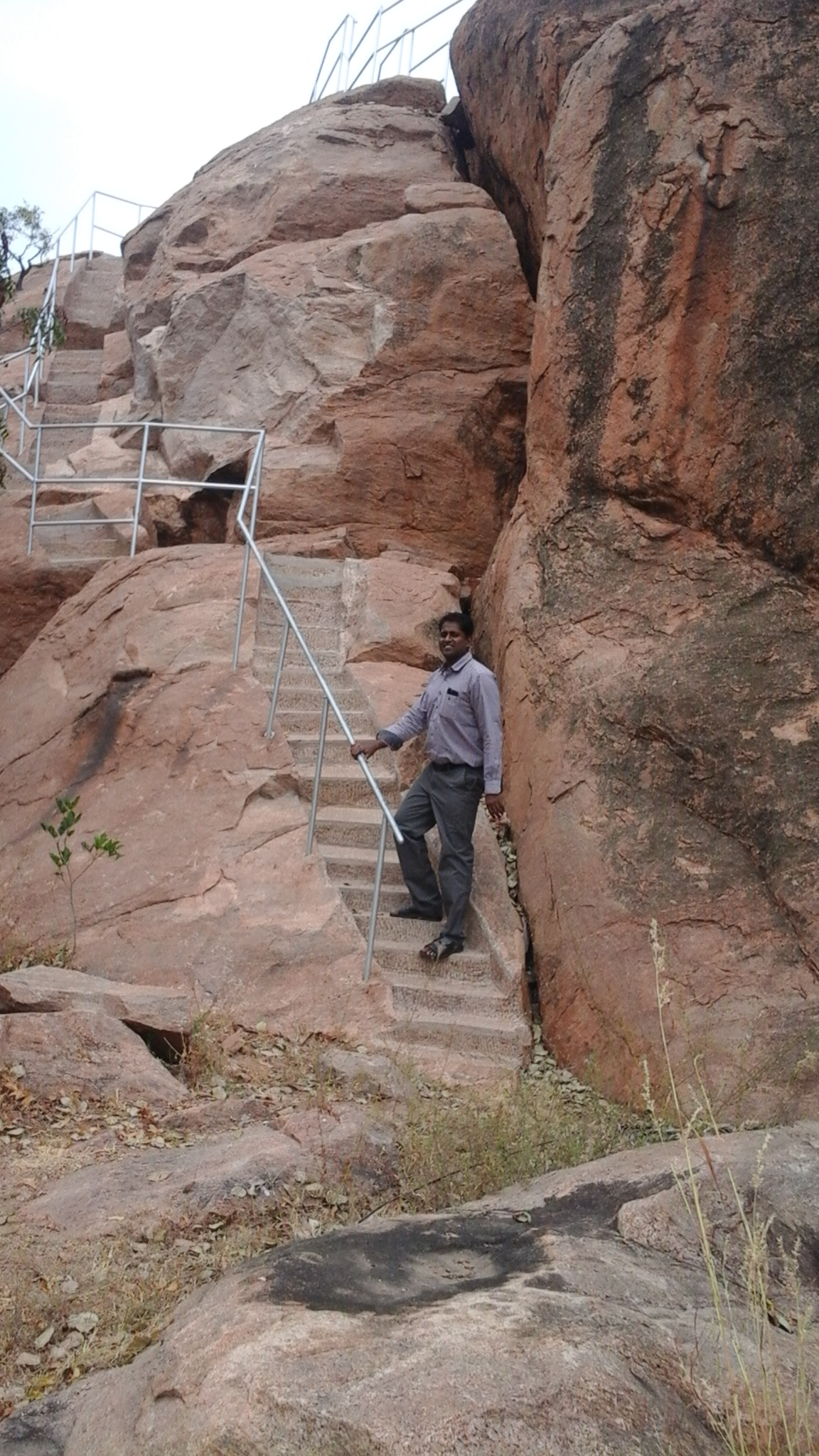
Nagamalai rock steps in pillar hall

Madurai is surrounded by eight hillocks that once served to guard the city against invading forces. Of these hills, three small but prominent hills (Yanaimalai, Pasumalai, and Nagamalai — Elephant, Cow, and Snake Hill respectively) have several interesting legends associated with them.

Samanar Hills, which is opposite Nagamalai, is of historical importance. Samanars (Tamil Jain) were said to have stayed on the hill, fearing persecution from the then rulers of Madurai. Many stone statues and other artifacts are present in Nagamalai.

=== Biodiversity ===
Nagamalai is also known for its snake biodiversity, and a government proposal is in the works for creating an ecotourism snake park in the area.

=== Water ===
The top of the hill consists of naturally formed rocks that resemble the form of a crocodile. Even though there is no water source at the top of the hill, it has a permanent flow of water on one side at Puluthu, which is herbal water that can be directly drunk.

== Education ==
Nagamalai is a notable educational hub in the outskirts of the Madurai city. The Madurai Kamaraj University is located near Nagamalai. It accommodates a number of other educational institutions such as:

- Palkalai Nagar Middle School
- Nadar Mahajana Sangam S. Vellaichamy Nadar College
- M.N.U. Jayaraj Nadar Higher Secondary School
- S.B.O.A. Matriculation Higher Secondary School
- Sirumalar Girls Higher Secondary School
- Akshara Matriculation Higher Secondary School
- M.N.U.J. Annapakiyam Matriculation Higher Secondary School
- KMR International School

== See also ==
- List of colleges and institutes in Madurai district
- S. Vellaichamy Nadar College
