= Swami Chidbhavananda =

Indian monk (1898–1985)

Personal life
- Born: Chinnu; 11 March 1898 Pollachi in Coimbatore District, Madras Presidency, India
- Died: 16 November 1985 (aged 87) Thirupparaithurai in Tiruchirapalli District, Tamil Nadu, India

Religious life
- Religion: Hinduism
- Founder of: Sri Ramakrishna Tapovanam
- Philosophy: Vedanta

Religious career
- Teacher: Swami Shivananda

Quotation

Self-perfection is the goal of life.

Swami Chidbhavananda (11 March 1898 – 16 November 1985) was born in Senguttaipalayam near Pollachi in Coimbatore District, Madras Presidency, India. His parents named him 'Chinnu'. He studied in Stanes School, Coimbatore. He was one of the two Indians in his class, the rest being British. His parents wanted him to go to England after completing his degree in Presidency College, Chennai.

While making arrangements for his travel abroad, he came across a book about Swami Vivekananda's philosophy. The book had a profound impact on his mind. He started visiting Ramakrishna Math in Mylapore often and had discussions with Swamijis. Finally, he decided to become a novice and went to Ramakrishna Mission in Belur, West Bengal. His guru was Swami Shivananda who was a direct disciple of Ramakrishna Paramahamsa.

As per the wish and advice of Swami Shivananda, he returned to Tamil Nadu and established an Ashram near Ooty. On 14 Jan 1937, he has started a Seva Sangh in a village (Athigaratty) near Ooty and named it Kalaimagal Seva Sangam (KMSSA). In the early forties (1942), he established Sri Ramakrishna Tapovanam in Tiruparaithurai, Tiruchi district. Since then, Tapovanam has established several educational institutions in Tamil Nadu and propagates the ideals of Ramakrishna and Vivekananda through religious and social activities such as book publishing.

Swami Chidbhavananda has authored more than a hundred books in Tamil and English. His books address a variety of topics, ranging from deep philosophical enquiry to contemporary social life.

He wrote many dramas based on ancient Hindu scriptures that are performed by students. He died in 1985. C. Subramaniam, was his nephew.

== Educational Institution's founded by Swami Chidbhavananda ==
Now under Sri Ramakrishna Tapovanam around 56 schools and colleges are running in TamilNadu.

His service started first at

Sri Ramakrishna Tapovanam Tirupparaithurai Tirchirapalli

Sri Vivekanandha Vidhyavanam High School Tirupparaithurai Tirchirapalli

Vivekananda College, Tiruvedakam Madurai, a Gurukula Institute of Life-training in 1971.

Sri Sarada Education Institutions, Salem in 1950.

Sri Sarada College for women, Thirunelveli.

Sri Sarada Samithi, Madurai.

Swamy Chidbhavananda Matric Hr. Sec School, Pollachi.

Sri Sarada Niketan College of Science for Women, Karur

== Books by Swami Chidbhavananda ==
Swamiji delivered more than 70,000 talks on religious harmony, Hinduism. He is author of more than 130 books and compiled and edited 30 books.

The Bhagavad Gita (Translation and Commentary)

Sri Lalithambika Sahasranama Stotram (Commentary)

Siva Sahasranama Stotram (Commentary)

Sri Vishnu Sahasranama Stotram (Commentary)

Facts of Brahman

The Indian National Education

Daily Divine Digest

Mind and Spirituality

Key to Higher Life

My Dear Students - A Counsel

The Nursery School

The Teacher

The Student

The School

Sri Krishna - The Manifest Divinity

Tirukkural (Commentary)

Hinduism Hosts Christianity

Bible in the Life of Vedanta

Reminiscences of Master Mahashaya
