= Thirumangalam taluk =

Settlement in Tamil Nadu, India

Thirumangalam taluk is a taluk of Madurai district of the Indian state of Tamil Nadu. The headquarters of the taluk is the town of Thirumangalam.

== Demographics ==
According to the 2011 census, the taluk of Thirumangalam had a population of 232,548 with 116,664 males and 115,884 females. There were 993 women for every 1000 men. The taluk had a literacy rate of 70.92. Child population in the age group below 6 was 11,777 Males and 10,862 Females.
