= Sholavandan =

Neighbourhood in Madurai district, Tamil Nadu, India

- town
- Location in Tamil Nadu, India
- Coordinates: 10.0167°N 77.9667°E
- Country: India
- State: Tamil Nadu
- District: Madurai

Government
  - Chairperson of Town Panchayat
- Elevation: 164 m (538 ft)

Population (2011)
  - Total: 22,578

Languages
  - Official: Tamil
- Time zone: UTC+5:30 (IST)
- PIN: 625214
- Telephone code: 04543
- Vehicle registration: TN-59

Sholavandan is a panchayat town in Madurai district in the Indian state of Tamil Nadu, India. It is located on the left bank of the Vaigai River, sixteen miles north west of Madurai. It is one of 12 "town- panchayats" of Madurai district.

== Etymology ==
The town has been variously referred to as "Sholavandan", "Solaikuruchi" and "Senagapuri". During the Sangam period, the town belonged to Pandya Kingdom. There is a popular local myth, that a war between Chola and the Pandya kingdoms, resulted in the name. The invading Chola king, apparently got a sense of reverence and awe, seeing the intensive agriculture and scenic beauty of the village, irrigated by the Vaigai river; which reminded him of the Cauvery Delta region. He abandoned the war. The town was then named as Cholanuvandan [Cholan+Uvandan]. Uvandan means getting awed, in Tamil. Legend has it that the invading king found the village and its flourishing agriculture cultivation, even more agriculturally prosperous then the historically famous Tanjore villages: and called this town as "Chinna Tanjai"(Tamil: சின்ன தஞ்சை).

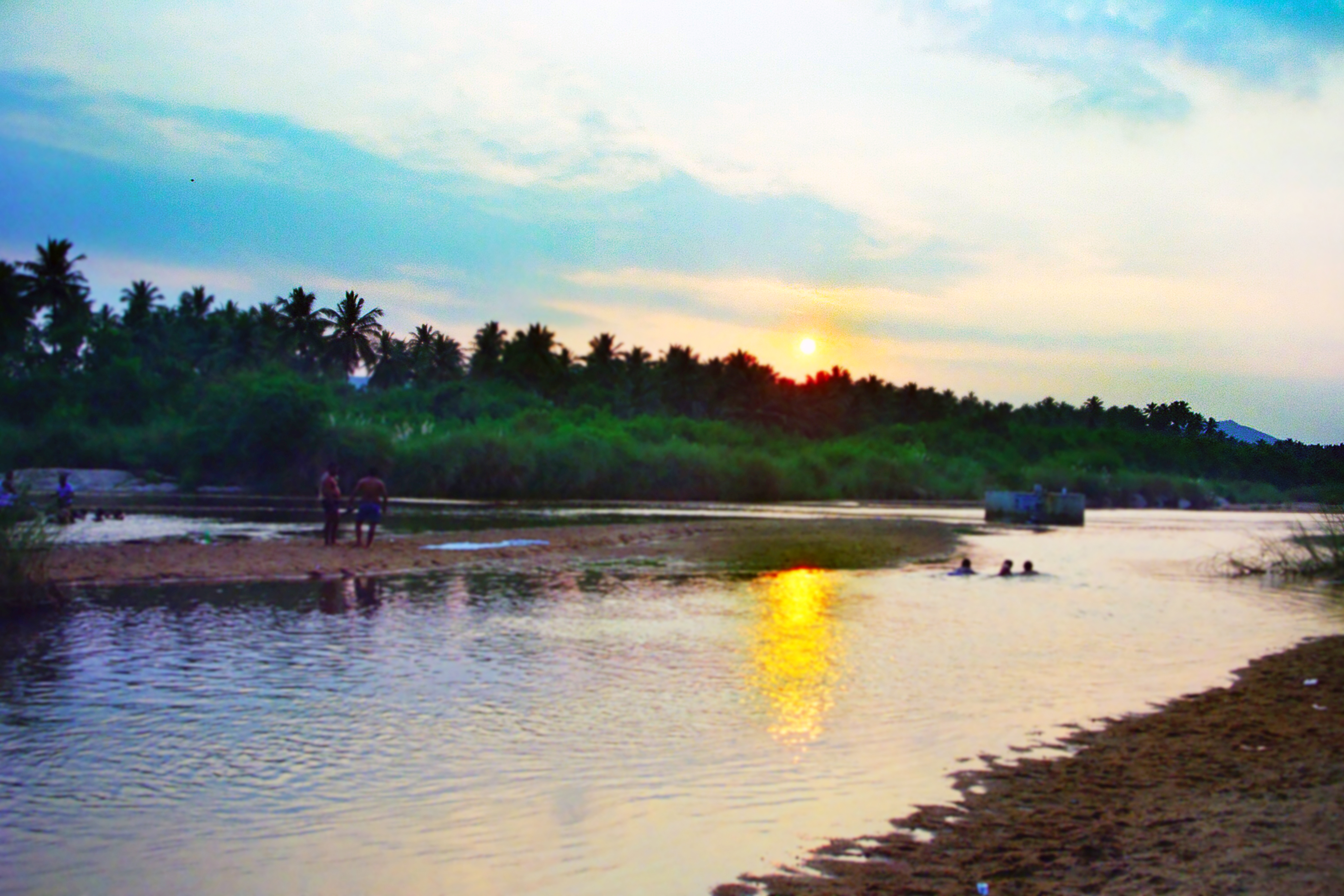
Vaigai River border of Sholavandan western side

== Geography ==
Sholavandan lies on the left bank of the river Vaigai. The river turns from its easterly direction, to bend and travel in a north–south direction at Sholavandan - before turning south east and flowing towards Madurai city. Sholavandan can be stated to be lying in some sort of a valley - between the Nagamalai hills and the Sirumalai. Both these hills can be perhaps described as spurs of the Western Ghats. Sholavandan is also the name of a forest range under Madurai division. The hills have some tracts as reserved forests, which is classified as a dry deciduous forest. The geology of the land around Sholavandan is speculated to be hard rock, represented by the Charnockites and mixed Gneisses. Sholavandan being on the banks of the river Vaigai would presumably have Alluvial soil. The fertile soil around Sholavandan could be due to this land being a part of an alluvial plain.

== History ==
This town appears in history from the Sangam period itself. A hillock in Anaipatti, a few kilometres from Sholavandan has a large cave: with hundreds of Jain beds with inscriptions carved in the Brahmi script. These are dated to 300 BCE. One of these inscriptions is stated to trace the origin of the name of the city Madurai. Some Jain beds around the village seem to have epigraph evidence of Sholavandan. In stone beds made by Jains, inscriptions have been found in the Tamil-Brahmi script;

"பாகன்ஊர் பே(ர)தன்; பிடன் இத்தசெபோன்"

where பாகன்ஊர் (Paganur) is thought to refer to the present village of Sholavandan

Pagunur has been stated to have been established in the 200 BCE; which can perhaps be taken as one of the earliest evidence of documented inhabitation. Thenur a village near Sholavandan, has been reported to have been mentioned in Sangam texts. A rock cut inscription in the nearby Samanamalai hillock, dated also to 200 BCE, has reported one interpretation of the Tamil Brahmi script to include the word Thenur.

A gold treasure found in Thenur, has been assigned a date of around 300 BCE: which could be another byte of information on the antiquity of the Sholavandan.

The Tenkarai irrigation tank has been reported to have been dug by Chezhiyan Senthanm (620 to 640 CE). A barrage to feed water into this tank from the Vaigai river is also attributed to this period. An inscription has been noted, which records the renovation of the "Kallanai" (kall -stone, anai-bund) during the period of Pandyan Srivallabhan.(1175-1180CE) According to V. Vedachalam, an archeologist, a twelfth-century inscription found in Kuruvithurai village, refers to this channel as "Parakrama Pandian Peraru". The king referred to, could be conceivably Parakrama Pandyan II

The famous Saivite saint, Thiru Gnana Sambandar is associated with the banks of the river Vaigai at a spot a couple of kilometres downstream from Sholavandan. There are unauthenticated stories that during the reign of Arikesari Maravarman( 670-710 CE)- Sambandar worshipped a Siva Lingam at this spot, which he called ‘Edu Senranai Tharum Edakam.’ That became the present Thiruvedagam.

The Iyravadeshwarar temple in Anaiyur, nearby Sholavandan, is estimated to have been constructed around the eight or the ninth century.

The Thengarai temple- termed Akhiladeswari sametha Moolanathar temple- dedicated to Lord Shiva is reported to have been built around 946-966 CE. An interesting sculpture here is of a bas relief, showing a person slitting his own throat. This sculpture has been dated to the tenth century; which is theorised to be commemorating an act of a "martyr".

The Cholan king Raja Raja Chola I has been reported to have conquered the Pandyan kingdom, around 1000 CE; and after capturing Madurai and the surrounding region, renamed this place as "Chaturveda mangalam".

The Jenagai Narayanaswamy temple is believed to have been constructed in the thirteenth century. Rani Mangammal is believed to have constructed a "chatram" (free lodge) for pilgrims, in the single agaraharam street, around 1700 CE.. Funds collected through this chatram is also believed to have paid for the more famous Mangammal chatram of Madurai.

Ariyanatha Mudaliar is said to have settled some of his relatives in Sholavandan, around the sixteenth century; during the reign of Viswanatha Nayak. This is locally stated to be the origin of the Mudaliar settlement, colloquially termed "Mudaliar Kottai".

In 1757, Hyder Ali captured Sholavandan, on his way from Dindigul to Madurai, reportedly "sweeping of the whole of the cattle and moveables in the surrounding country". This invasion was reportedly at the invitation of Puli Thevar and the then ruler of Madurai, Barkadthullah.

Under the British rule, Sholavandan started receiving some benefits of a settled administration. In 1856, the Madurai collector reported on the construction of a new road connecting Tirumangalam, Madurai to Sholavandan; to "save the necessity of bandies going from the southward to Dindigul, coming into Madura". This road construction was apparently started with a subscription raised by the merchants of the Nadar community of Thirumangalam.

Sholavandan started receiving the benefits of western school education as early as 1870. The report said that "Sholavandan is one of the best schools of its grade in the district...the boys pay a fee of Rs.1-8-0. There is at this school a Sanskrit class. No school house, has however yet being built".

Another mention of the Sholavandan Anglo Vernacular school is found in another report in 1877.

Sholavandan was one of the villages featuring prominently in a controversy over the legality of a traditional Hindu custom of swinging devotees from the hook in temples; which appeared in the English press in late October 1891.

Sholavandan and the neighbouring villages, got increased access to Vaigai water after the construction of Peranai regulator in the 1890s decade.

== Culture ==
Sholavandan features prominently in the movie Pattikada Pattanama where Sivaji Ganesan and Jayalalithaa played the lead roles. It is also featured in the movie Karimetu Karuvayan starring Vijayakanth.

Intensive agriculture of paddy, seems to have shaped the culture of Sholavandan. Retired professor and archaeologist V Vedhachalam, has documented a popular saying that a person who went to Sholavandan would get his daily rice. "The quote became popular as Sholavandan was one of the most fertile places in Madurai, where paddy was cultivated round the clock, three seasons a year."

As with much of South Tamil Nadu, bull taming or Jallikattu and cock fights, are a part of the village culture. These events are usually around traditional temple. festivals.

== Education ==
Sholavandan houses educational institutions like Vivekananda College, Madurai; which is located at Thiruvedagam, a couple of kilometres from Sholavandan on the banks of the river Vaigai. This is an autonomous educational institution of higher learning, affiliated to Madurai Kamaraj University. Vivekanandha Matriculation Higher Secondary School, Government Girls Highers Secondary School, Arasan shanmuganar Government boys higher secondary school, MVM Matriculation school and Kamarajar higher secondary school are the local schools. And also many other primary schools were started few years back, A primary school is started two years ago in rayapuram couple of kilometers from sholavandan which is Zee public school(CBSE curriculum).

== Politics ==
Elected in the 2016 Tamil Nadu state assembly election, K.Manickam of the All India Anna Dravida Munnetra Kazhagam represents Sholavandan in the Tamil Nadu Legislative Assembly. Sholavandan assembly constituency is part of Theni (Lok Sabha constituency), which is represented by P. Raveendranath Kumar of the All India Anna Dravida Munnetra Kazhagam.

== Demographics ==
In the 2011 census, Sholavandan had a population of 22,578, including 11,168 males and 11,410 females. The population included 2,213 children aged 0–6.

== Economy ==
The main occupation of the people is agriculture which benefits from access to the irrigated water of the Vaigai river, through the Peranai regulator in Dindigul District. Sholavandan used to be very famous for its Betel leaves, which were exported to other states in the sub-continent. Rice is the major crop grown; the extensive paddy fields, around Sholavandan are a visual evidence. Bananas and coconuts are the other major crops. Thenkarai village, which lies across the river Vaigai from Sholavandan is sometimes called a small "coconut island".

== Geographical indication ==
Sholavandan Vetrilai was awarded the Geographical Indication (GI) status tag from the Geographical Indications Registry, under the Union Government of India, on 31 March 2023 which is valid upto 28 October 2031.

Tamil Nadu State Agricultural Marketing Board from Guindy and Vetri Kodikaal Vivasayigal Sangam from Nagarisalai, proposed the GI registration of 'Sholavandan Vetrilai'. After filing the application in October 2021, the Betel leaf was granted the GI tag in 2023 by the Geographical Indication Registry in Chennai, making the name "Sholavandan Vetrilai" exclusive to the Betel leaf cultivated in the region. It thus became the second Betel leaf variety from Tamil Nadu and the 56th type of goods from Tamil Nadu to earn the GI tag.

The prestigious GI tag, awarded by the GI registry, certifies that a product possesses distinct qualities, adheres to traditional production methods, and has earned a reputation rooted in its geographical origin.

== Notable people ==
- G. Gnanasambandam, Tamil professor and scholar, Tamil film actor
