= Tirumangalam, Madurai =

Tirumangalam
- Town
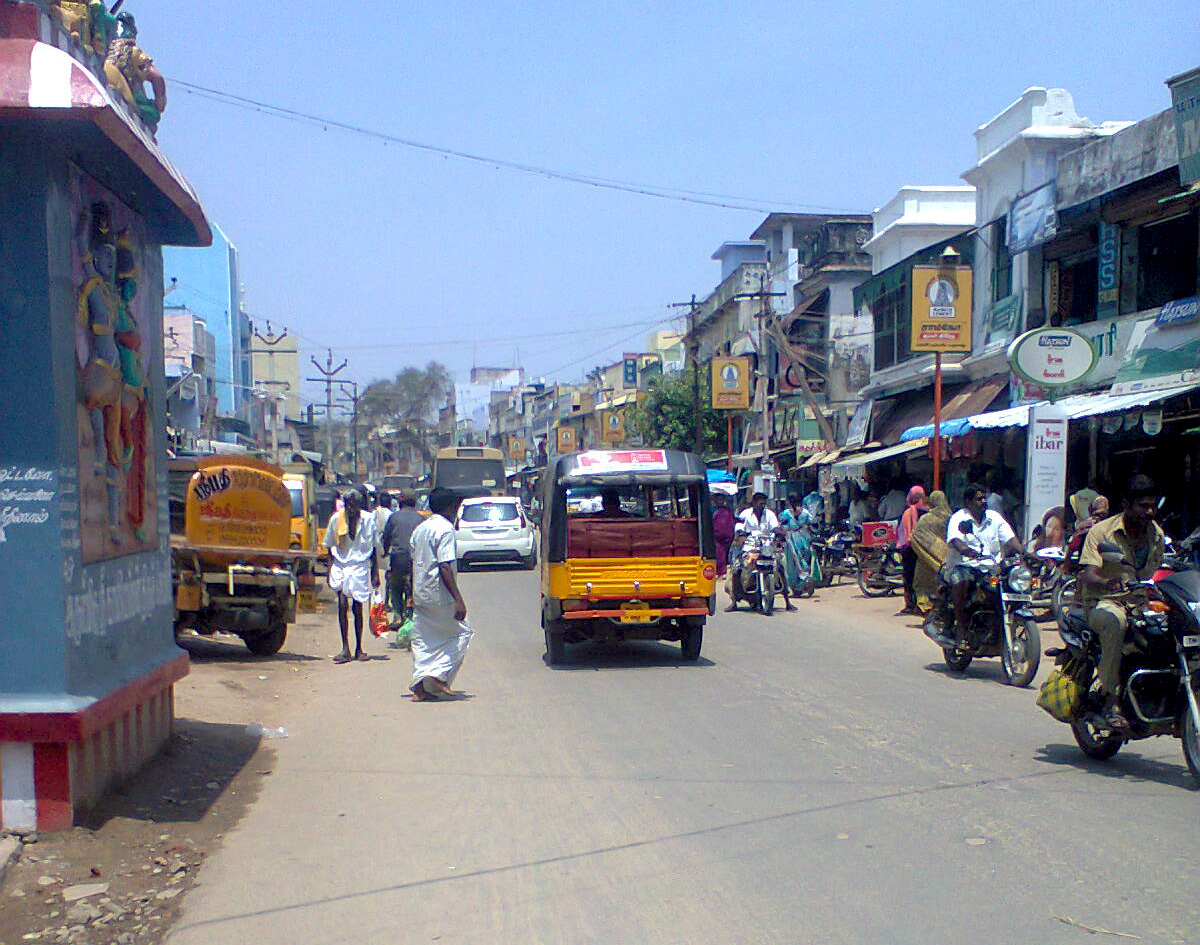
- View of Thirumangalam Usilampatti road

- Tirumangalam, Tamil Nadu
- Coordinates: 9.821600°N 77.989100°E
- Country: India
- State: Tamil Nadu
- District: Madurai
- Taluk: Thirumangalam
- Assembly Constituency: Thirumangalam
- Lok Sabha Constituency: Virudhunagar

Government
  - MLA: M. Manimaran
  - Chairman: M. Ramya Muthukumar

Area
  - Total: 15.70 km^{2} (6.06 sq mi)
- Elevation: 150 m (490 ft)

Population (2011)
  - Total: 51,194
  - Density: 3,261/km^{2} (8,445/sq mi)

Languages
  - Official: Tamil
- Time zone: UTC+5:30 (IST)
- PIN: 625706
- Telephone code: 04549
- Vehicle registration: TN-58 Z
- Sex ratio: 50:50 ♂/♀
- Website: www.municipality.tn.gov.in/tirumangalam

Tirumangalam is a town in the Madurai Metropolitan Area of the Indian state of Tamil Nadu also called as 'Thoongaa Nagarathin Thunai Nagaram' (Sub District of Madurai).

== Etymology ==
As per archaeologist and historian Kudavayil Balasubramanian, the ancient name of Tirumangalam was 'Rajarajan Tirumangalam'.

== Geography ==
The latitude and longitude of this town is 9°91’ N and 77°98’E respectively and the mean sea level (MSL) is 164.150m. The town is situated on the banks of river Gundar, a distributary of river Vaigai. The average maximum and minimum temperatures are of 39 °C and 27 °C. The town gets major rainfall during the south west monsoon period. The average annual rainfall being received in the town is 40.95 cm.

== Demographics ==
Religious census
Religion	Percent(%)
Hindu	84.45%
Muslim	12.37%
Christian	3.06%
Sikh	0.02%
Other	0.1%

According to 2011 census, Thirumangalam had a population of 51,194 with a sex-ratio of 1,013 females for every 1,000 males, much above the national average of 929. A total of 4,952 were under the age of six, constituting 2,551 males and 2,401 females. Scheduled Castes and Scheduled Tribes accounted for 7.21% and 0.03% of the population respectively. The average literacy of the town was 81.91%, compared to the national average of 72.99%. The town had a total of 13564 households. There were a total of 19,212 workers, comprising 151 cultivators, 490 main agricultural labourers, 314 in house hold industries, 17,339 other workers, 918 marginal workers, 38 marginal cultivators, 44 marginal agricultural labourers, 44 marginal workers in household industries and 792 other marginal workers.

As per the religious census of 2011, Thirumangalam had 84.45% Hindus, 12.37% Muslims, 3.06% Christians, 0.02% Sikhs and 0.1% following other religions.

== Nomenclature ==
It is also known that 'the mangalyam/wedlock for Lordess Meenakshi of Madurai was designed and made in Tirumangalam', so the name Tiru+Mangal(y)am came. In other way, it is said that when Lord Murugan married Theivanai in Thiruparankundram (nearest to Tirumangalam), the "Tirumangalyam" was made here and hence the name came.

== Festivals ==
The Patrakali Mariamman temple located here was built in 1852. Every year, in the Tamil month of Vaikasi, a 13-day festival is celebrated, Vaikasi Thiruvizha, along with daily deity procession and exhibitions. And also the Milk ice cream alias 'Paal Ice' was prepared only at the occasion of Vaigasi Festival.

== Politics ==
Tirumangalam Legislative assembly constituency is a part of Virudhunagar (Lok Sabha constituency). During Tamil Nadu legislative assembly by-election, 2009-2010 for Tirumangalam held on 9 January over 89 percent of the votes were polled.

== Transportation ==
Regular bus services are available from all important cities of Tamil Nadu and all the Buses from Southern parts of the State pass through Tirumangalam. Frequent city bus facilities are available from Tirumangalam busstand to Periyar busstand, Arapalayam busstand, Mattuthavani MGR busstand, Anna Busstand, Usilampatti, Virudhunagar, Sholavandan and Vadipatti.

The government transport operates TNSTC buses and private travels operate semi sleeper buses such as PARVEEN, KPN everyday to Chennai. There are also private bus services operated on daily basis to all major cities.

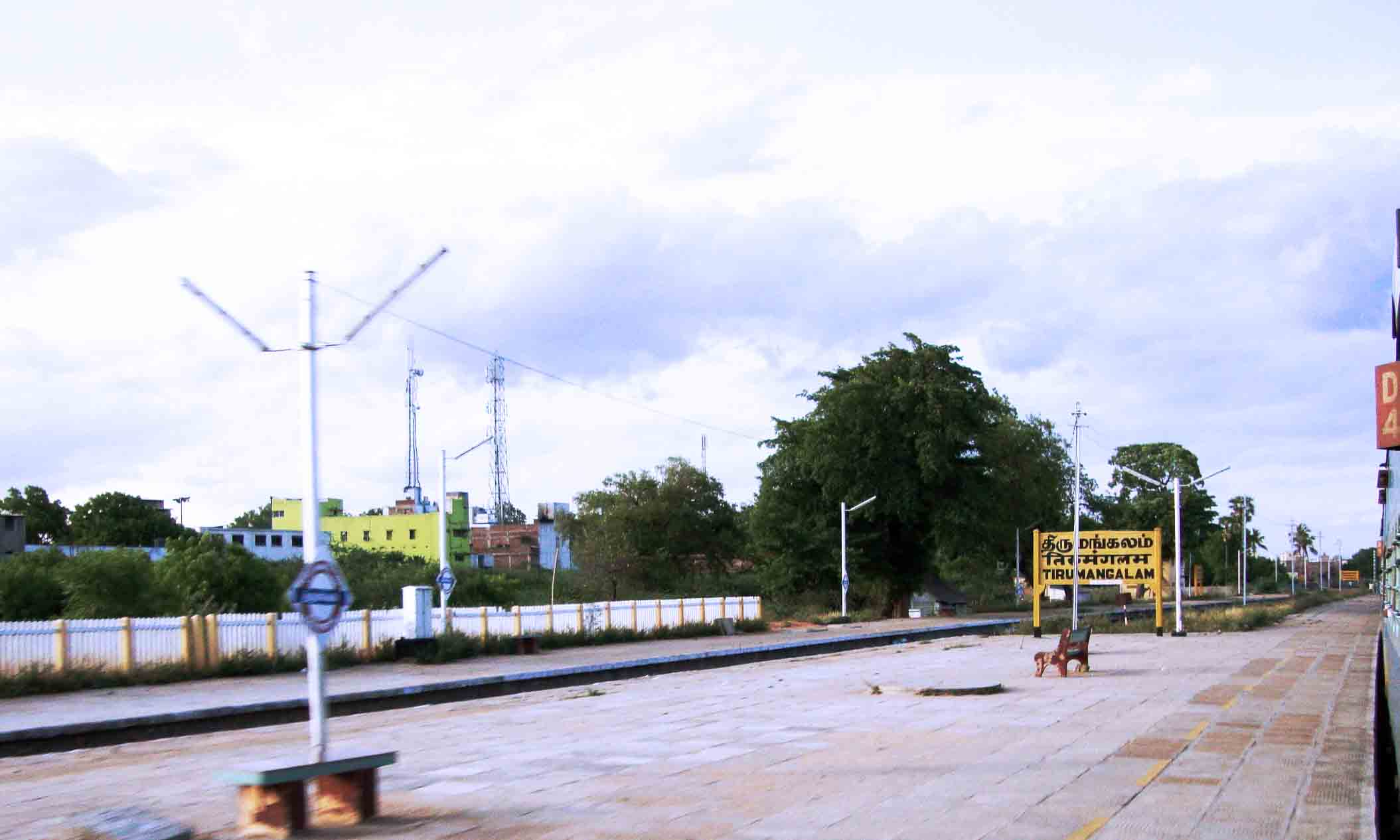
Thirumangalam Railway Station

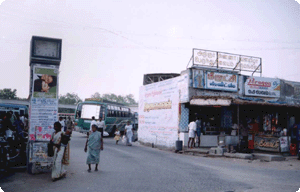
TNSTC Bus stand

All passenger trains running between Madurai, Tirunelveli, Nagercoil, Kollam (Quilon) stop at Tirumangalam. Nearest Airport is Madurai International Airport, at Avaniapuram, 15 km (9.3 mi) from the town.

The all new AC urban buses used to start their services from Tirumangalam to Arappalayam Bus Terminus in Madurai. Travel distance of 22 km (14 mi) approximately for a one way trip.

Tirumangalam railway station, is located 18 km from Madurai junction, on the Madurai–Tirunelveli line.

== Educational institutions ==
Tirumangalam has more than 6 higher secondary schools. Educational institutions have been providing education to thousands of people around the district since 1908.

== See also ==
- Maittanpatti
