= Sathaiyar =

Sathaiyar (Tamil:சாத்தையாறு) originates from sirumalai hills and flows southward and empties into Vaigai River. The basins covers an area of 819 square kilometres (316 sq mi). The total ayacut of the sub-basin is 4,279.89 hectares (10,575.8 acres). Near Vadipatti, Sathaiyar Dam has been constructed across this river for irrigation purpose.
