= S. Rajeswaran =

Former judge of the Madras High Court

Justice S. Rajeswaran
- Born: Rajeswaran; Tanjore Tamil Nadu India
- Occupation: Judge (retired)
- Known for: Jallikattu
- Children: Daughter

Justice S Rajeswaran is a former judge of the Madras High Court. S. Rajeswaran was directly elevated to the Madras High Court from the panel of Advocates. His native district is Thanjavur, Tamil Nadu. He had headed the Commission of inquiry for the violence in Jallikattu Agitation. He also chaired the PT Lee Chengalvaraya Naickar Trust along with Nine Trustees.

Justice S. Rajeswaran was appointed as the Administrator of Yadava College, Madurai and its Trust Fund.

== Early life ==
Rajeswaran was born in Thanjavur. After he completed his schooling there, he completed his law studies at the Madras Law College. After completing his law studies, he enrolled as an Advocate with the Bar Council of Tamil Nadu and Pondicherry.

== High Court ==
S. Rajeswaran practiced as an Advocate in all fields of law in the Madras High Court. Later, he was directly elevated as a judge of the Madras High Court.

== Important cases ==
=== Mexico Child Case ===
S. Rajeswaran, as a sitting Judge of Madurai Bench of Madras High Court, had dealt with a case involving the custody of a 5-year-old child from Mexico. The father of the child (who was a Mexican working as a professor in a private Educational Institution at Krishnankoil, Tamil Nadu) was charged for murdering the mother of the child and disposed the body in a suitcase. The murder took place as the result of the dispute over the custody of the child. S. Rajeswaran, ordered that the child should be handed over to the Mexican Embassy at New Delhi and then the child should be sent to Mexico and monitored by the Mexican Embassy until it is handed over to the appropriate guardian as ordered by the Mexican court.

== Jallikattu Agitation ==
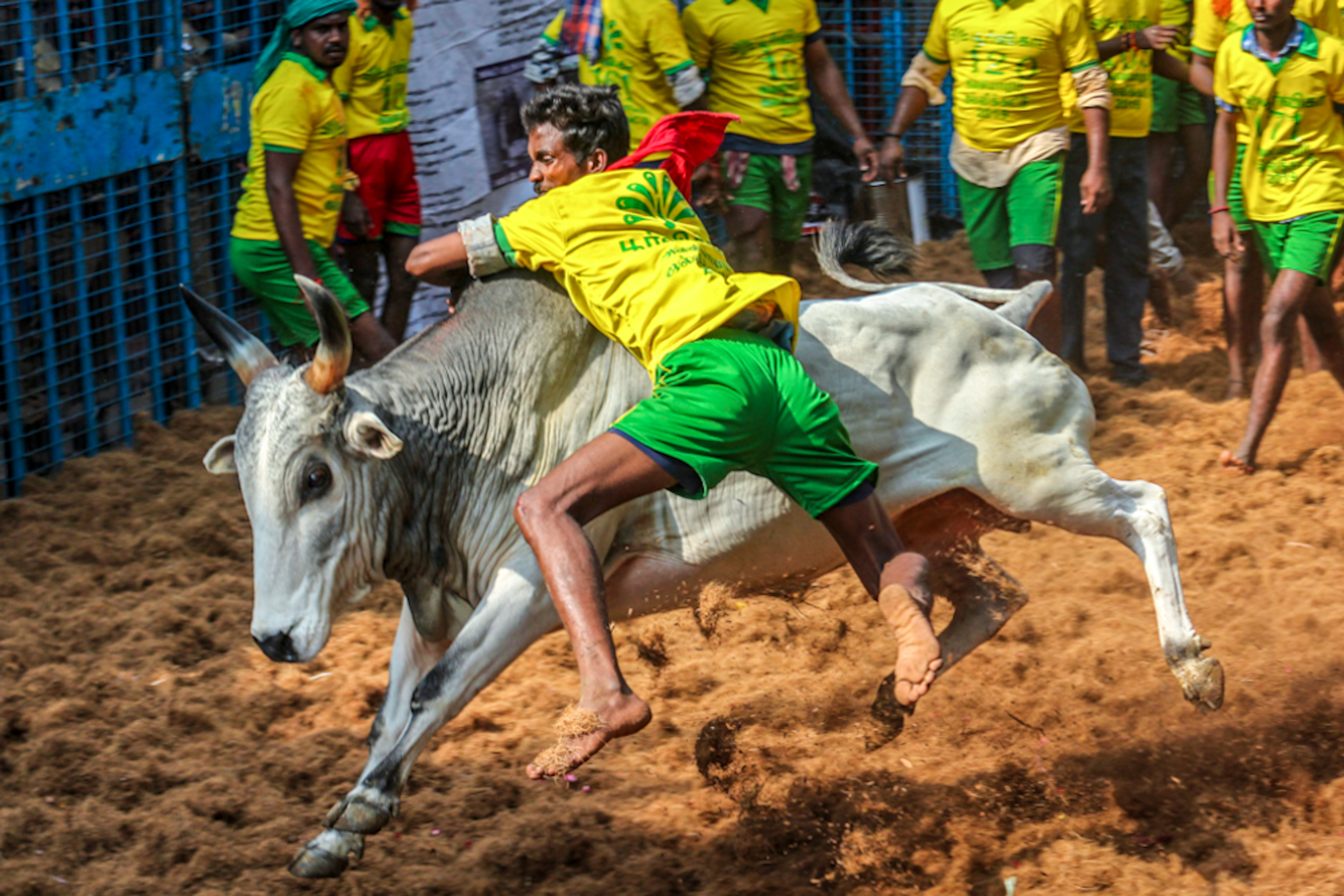
Jallikattu at Avaniyapuram, Madurai.

Following the protests demanding Jallikattu, Madras High Court Judge S. Rajeswaran was appointed by the Government of Tamil Nadu to inquire the violence took place during the protest. Cases were registered against those who took part in the agitation at Madurai. A total of 179 protesters who took part in the protests were charged under various sections of Law. Police have registered cases against 179 protesters, out of 179 protesters, 64 were from Alanganallur, 54 protesters in the Sellur protest, 34 in the Perungkudi protest and 27 in the Tilakar Thidal protest.

A commission headed by Justice S. Rajeswaran was appointed to inquire into the incidents of violence. The names of the 179 people in the cases are not just from Madurai. At most, young people studying and working in 20 districts came here and took part in the Protest. They were unable to attend the ongoing trial in every court. Only if all 179 people gather for the trial then only the trial will continue. But it seems impossible to gather all of them at a single place for the trial. They have had to travel long distances and time for the end of the cases.
