= Semmanipatti =

Village in Tamil Nadu, India

Coordinates: 10°07′N 78°28′E

Semmanipatti Semminipatti
- village
- Interactive map of Semmanipatti
- Country: India
- State: Tamil Nadu
- District: Madurai

Languages
  - Official: Tamil
- Time zone: UTC+5:30 (IST)
- PIN: 625218
- Telephone code: 91-4541
- Nearest city: Vadipatti
- Lok Sabha constituency: Dindigul
- Vidhan Sabha constituency: Sholavandan

Semmanipatti, also called Semminipatti or Chemminipatti, is a village in the Indian state of Tamil Nadu. Situated at a distance of 29 kilometres (18 mi) North of Madurai and 3 kilometres (1.9 mi) south of Vadipatti on the National Highway (NH 7).

== History ==
Semminipatti village comes under the control of its own administrative office as well as vadipatti tehsil (known as taluk) office. Semminipatti village has one Government forest office for controlling the Sirumalai hills. The hills have famous waterfalls and controlled near by village (Kutladampatti) administrative office. There are 600 families, all of the Hindu religion.

Semminipatti does not have its own post office or police station. The village is served by the post office in nearby Katchaikatti village, whilst Vadipatti police station is responsible for Semmanipatti.

Two decades ago Semminipatti was famous for Khap generally known as panchayats. It's always performed in chavadi (Temple as well as resting place for farmers who worked hard in days and taking rests in evening till midnight), chavadi is located in the centre place (mostly known as assembly place) of village. For past 10 years there is no panchayats performed in this village after the Indian Supreme Court has declared illegal ‘khap panchayats' which often decree or encourage honour killings or other institutionalised atrocities against boys and girls of different castes and religions who wish to get married or have married.

== Economy ==
All the families mostly depend on agriculture. Semminipatti is the largest producer of coconuts for vadipatti weekly market (formerly known as chandhai). The farmers are producing the rice, groundnuts (peanuts), sugarcane, banana, brinjal, tomatoes, onions, cottons, fruits like mangoes, sapota, black grapes and flowers like jasmine.

The village has nearly 7 bricks manufacturing units. It exports bricks to various cities in Tamil Nadu. And some section of people working in bricks manufacturing unit. The village has 2 blue metal quarries.

Some section of people prefer to taking the jobs in coimbatore and tirupur cotton mills. Some are working in chennai and other parts of country.

Most of the young man prefer to join the indian Army and police service after their Intermediate class. This village has nearly 12 serving indian Army Soldiers and 10 Retired indian Army personnel.

Semminipatti has 8 coffee cafes, 10 grocery stores, 1 tailoring shop and 1 barbershop.

== Transport ==
People can reach semminipatti through bus route only. semminipatti has no railway station or Airport.

Through Bus, there is often mini bus from vadipatti to semminipatti for the interval of 20 minutes. vadipatti is 3 km from semminipatti and well connected with National Highway. Also people can reach from madurai and dindigul through vadipatti.

Through Train, the nearest railway station are Kodaikanal Road (15 km), sholavandan (18 km), madurai (27 km), dindigul(27 km).

Through Air, the nearest airport is madurai airport (35 km).

== Education ==
Semminipatti has one junior high government school (Tamil Medium) and controlled by Tamil Nadu state board( Which has 1st standard to 8th standard), it has one Anganwadi Centre and it controlled by Integrated Child Development Services, Tamil Nadu and also it has one library. But most children are going to vadipatti for primary and secondary education. Here peoples are studied average 10th standard.

== Festival ==
Semminipatti most celebrated festivals are Thai Pongal, Muthallamman Kovil Festival and Kaliamman Kovil Festival, Diwali. Pongal (Harvest Festival) to honour bulls, who work hard throughout the year. Bulls are bathed, their horns are painted, and in some villages they wear new dresses too. For Pongal festival celebrated for 3 days that's mostly falls on 15 January. This 3 days is heaven for young children for showing their skills in various formats. In pongal festival young men are clubbed and organizing the sporting event like kabaddi, cycling and different stage activity. from 2018 Muthallamman kabaddi sports club conducting kabaddi tournaments. Every year nearly 50 teams are participating in the tournaments.

== Development breakthrough ==
The significant development of Semminipatti came after 1997 only.

From an agriculture point of view, from 2001 to 2007 the rainfall is below par average rainfall. This makes the well dry. This affected the farmers going for agriculture. The coconut trees died due to the insufficient water. Most of the farmers left the farming and doing any other jobs in and around Semminipatti for livelihood. After 2007 there is the average rainfall throughout Semminipatti this makes the farmers return to the agriculture. This makes the economy boosting.

In 2009 Government of India opened the MITP (Madurai Industrial Textile Park) in vadipatti. Semminipatti village women getting jobs in MITP. This removes the jobless fear among women. They contribute the earning money to their families to increase their family economy.

Semminipatti's proximity to the National Highway has drawn migratory labor from across Tamil Nadu, leading to population growth and a steady supply of daily-wage workers that supports the local brick manufacturing industry.

Now the land value (real estate business) is getting high for 4 folds of actual value of 2006.

== Controversies ==
In 2004 to 2007 due to the poor rainfall most of the farmers sold the sand from their agriculture land to the brick manufacturing unit (Sand is the important raw material in brick manufacturing). This led to the farmers can't use these lands for further cultivation.

== President of Semminipatti ==
Mrs. Shanti Kannadasan (2011 - Till Now)

Mrs. Shanti Kannadasan (2006–2011)

Mr. R.Nanappan (2001–2006)

Mr. P.Hari Krishnan (1996–2001).
