= Mongupethanpatty =

- Village
- Location in Tamil Nadu, India
- Coordinates: 10.533°N 78.067°E
- Country: India
- State: Tamil Nadu
- District: Dindigul

Area
  - Total: 3 km^{2} (1.2 sq mi)
- Elevation: 260 m (850 ft)

Population (2001)
  - Total: 786
  - Density: 260/km^{2} (680/sq mi)

Languages
  - Official: Tamil
- Time zone: UTC+5:30 (IST)
- PIN: 624702
- Telephone code: 91 4551
- Vehicle registration: TN 57
- Sex ratio: 1:1 ♂/♀
- Literacy: 66%

Mongupethanpatty is a small village, located near Eriodu in Vedasandur taluk, Dindigul District, Tamil Nadu, India.

== Geography ==
Mongupethanpatty is located at 10°31′59″N 78°04′01″E / 10.533°N 78.067°E / 10.533; 78.067. It has an average elevation of 260 meters (853 feet).

The nearest airport is at Madurai and the nearest railway station is Dindigul Junction Railway Station. The nearby tourist destinations are Kodaikanal, Sirumalai, Palani.

== History ==
This village was under Nayak rulers during 17th century and in the mid of 18th century, Hyder Ali, took over. This village was carved out of Madurai District in the year 1985 and attached to newly formed Dindigul district.

== People ==
This small village has 150 families in it and around 400 voters. Agriculture was the main occupation during 90s. But after the year 2K, that trend has been gradually reduced due to heavy drought.

Some people of this village were started moving to the other cities/states like Tirupur, Coimbatore, Hyderabad & Kerala for earning. They use to come to this village during Pongal, Diwali, Summer (May month – Cricket Festival) & for some functions like marriage.

== Politics ==
=== Village Panchayat ===
This village comes under ward number 1 in the Village Panchayat Chitthur, Vedasandur Block, Dindigul District. And the elected candidates are,

Role	Candidate
President	Subramani (Varapatti)
Councillor 1	Palanichamy

=== Legislative Assembly ===
This village comes under Vedasandur legislative assembly in Dindigul District and the elected candidate is Dr.V.P.B.Paramasivam

=== Lok sabha Constituency ===
This village comes under Karur lok sabha constituency and the elected candidate is Mr. M.Thambidurai

== Nearest towns ==
Towns	Away from
Dindigul	25 km
Karur	60 km
Palani	60 km
Madurai	75 km
Trichy	100 km
