= Mavur Dam =

Coordinates: 10°8′19″N 77°57′41″E

Mavur Dam is a masonry gravity dam located on Dindigul district in the Indian state of Tamil Nadu. Sirumalai hill is the prime catchment of the dam.
