= Sembukudipatti =

- Village
- Location in Tamil Nadu, India Sembukudipatti (India)
- Coordinates: 10.047°N 78.011°E
- Country: India
- State: Tamil Nadu
- District: Madurai

Government
  - Type: Panchayati raj (India)
  - Body: Gram panchayat

Population (2001)
  - Total: 1,253

Languages
  - Official: Tamil
- Time zone: UTC+5:30 (IST)
- PIN: 625221
- Telephone code: (91)04543
- Vehicle registration: TN-59
- Nearest city: Madurai
- Lok Sabha constituency: Dindugul
- Vidhan Sabha constituency: Sholavandan

Sembukudipatti, is a small village near Vadipatti situated 22 km North West of Madurai in Tamil Nadu, India. This village is best known for the Metal Park Mountain, Vaguthumalai in Tamil, 1 km north to it. By means of blue-metal quarries this mountain contributes some useful amount of revenue to the Vadipatti Taluk. This village comes under the Alanganallur Panchayat Union. Village has population of more than 1,200 as on Census Report 2001.

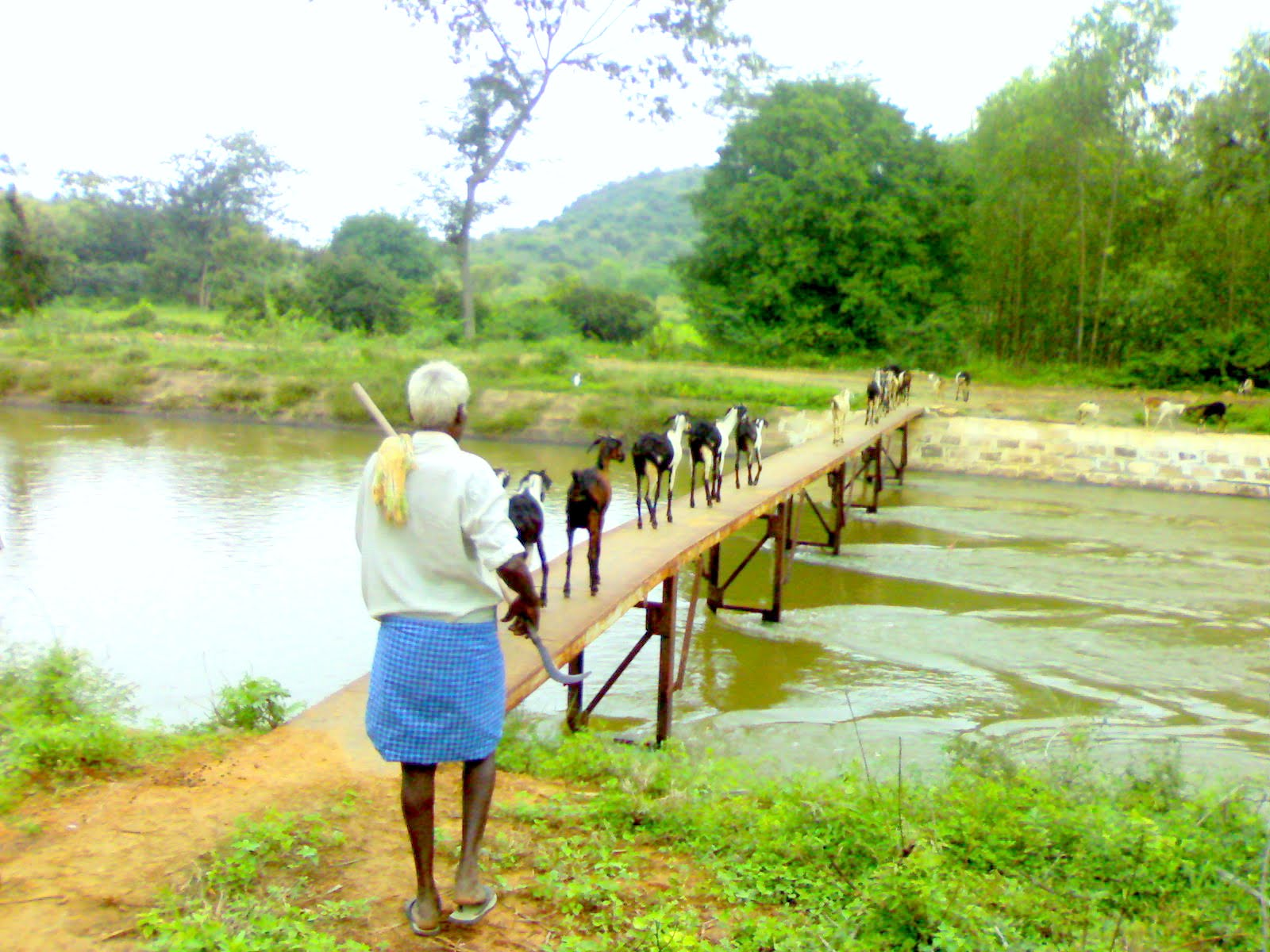
A village shepherd leads his goats cross the Mullai Periyar Irrigation Channel, Sembukudipatti
