= Swami Ramanagiri =

Swedish philosopher and mystic

Swami Ramanagiri (June 19, 1921, Stockholm, Sweden – May 23, 1955, Madras, India), born Per Alexander Westin, was a Swedish philosopher and mystic.

Westin became a wandering Hindu monk after a study trip to India in the late 1940s. He was a devotee of the mystic Ramana Maharshi and established the still-active temple Ramanagiri Swamigal Ashramam in Tamil Nadu.

== Biography ==
Per Westin was born in the Storkyrkoförsamlingen parish, Stockholm, on June 19, 1921. His parents were Robert Westin and Rudith Westin (née Westerberg). His family originated from Rådmansö in Roslagen, where his ancestors were ship captains, farmers, and fishermen. His father moved to Stockholm in 1909, became a steel engraver, and founded the successful metal factory "Westins Ateljé" in 1918. The success of the business provided the Westin family with significant financial stability, and in 1932, they moved from Södermalm to the villa district of Djursholm in Danderyd.

Westin studied at the prestigious Lundsberg boarding school from 1939 to 1943. After his father’s sudden death in the spring of 1943, Westin became increasingly interested in philosophy and spirituality. In the fall of 1944, Westin began studying for a theological-philosophical degree at Uppsala University under Professor Geo Widengren. After taking a break for military service in 1944-45, during which he trained as a sergeant at the Gotland Infantry Regiment’s platoon commander school, he returned to his studies and completed his bachelor's degree in 1946. Westin’s academic background and personal interests led him to Eastern philosophies and mysticism. In particular, he was influenced by Swami Vivekananda's work, with the book "Raja Yoga" playing a key role in shaping his spiritual aspirations. In the fall of 1947, Westin had the opportunity to complete his master's degree at Banaras Hindu University in Varanasi under the guidance of Vice-Chancellor Sarvepalli Radhakrishnan. However, his time in India led him away from academia and deeper into spiritual practice.

Westin soon encountered influential spiritual figures, including the Danish mystic Alfred Sørensen, known as Sunyata, who introduced him to Ramana Maharshi's teachings. During his time in India, Westin underwent a profound transformation. He was initiated as a sannyasi within a strict ascetic Hindu tradition. In early 1949, he visited Sri Ramanasramam in Tiruvannamalai, where he experienced a deep spiritual awakening; from now on, he always referred to himself in the third person as "this fool" to distance himself from the Ego. To honor Ramana Maharshi, whom he considered his spiritual master, he took the name Swami Ramanagiri. His spiritual practice revolved around Atma Vichara, a form of self-inquiry. After his spiritual experiences, Westin gathered a small group of disciples. In September 1952, one of his disciples, Mr. Balasubbiah from Madurai, acquired a small piece of land near the village of Kutladampatti in the Sirumalai Hills of Tamil Nadu. Here, Westin founded "Ramana Padam", later renamed "Ramanagiri Swamigal Ashramam", which continues to honor his memory. The current head of the ashram (as of 2025), Swamy Ramana Pirasananda Giri, is the grandson of Mr. Balasubbiah. A collection of 38 quotes by Westin, titled "Cold Fire," reflects his deep commitment to the Advaita Vedanta tradition.

Per Westin, known as Swami Ramanagiri, died on May 23, 1955, at Perundurai Sanatorium due to tuberculosis.

== Legacy and Myths ==
Westin is believed to be the only Swede who was a disciple of Ramana Maharshi. He is also one of the few Westerners in modern times to have an ashram named after him in India. Westin's life has been surrounded by various myths, including claims of royal ancestry and exaggerated financial sacrifices. These claims, often found in hagiographic accounts, are not supported by historical evidence.

== Literature ==
- Abhishiktananda (1979). The Secret of Arunachala. ISPCK.
- Arkiv Digital. www.arkivdigital.se. BiS, The Population of Sweden 1800-1947, [2025-03-03].
- Camhi, B. & Gurubaksh, R. (2015). Dancing with the Void: The Innerstandings of a Rare-born Mystic. Non-Duality Press.
- Dagens Nyheter (1943). Robert Westin [Obituary], Dagens Nyheter, Part 1, page 12.1943-05-09. Online Archive [25-03-03].
- Email (2024-08-24) from administrator Karin Notes, Lundsbergs School.
- Email (2024-11-24) from the head of "Ramanagiri Swamigal Ashramam," Swamy Ramana Pirasananda Giri.
- Godman, David (2000). The Power of the Presence (Part Two). New Leaf D. C.
- Godman, David (1994). "Swami Ramanagiri" in The Mountain Path, Jayanti 1994, pp. 144–148.
- Runestam, Staffan (1958). Värmlands nation i Uppsala 1945-1954 : porträtt och biografiska uppgifter. Stockholm; [Värmlands nation].
- The Bronte Company Limited (2020). Ashrams of India: Volume 1. Kindle Edition.
- The Bronte Company Limited (2020). Ashrams of India: Volume 2. Kindle Edition.
- Uppsala University (staff). Uppsala University Catalogue 1943-44. Uppsala.
- Uppsala University (staff). Uppsala University Catalogue 1946-47. Uppsala.
