= Periya Ilanthai Kulam =

Village in Tamil Nadu, India

Periya Ilanthai Kulam is a village located in the Madurai district of Tamil Nadu, India. It is situated on the slopes of Vaguthu Malai.

The Jallikattu, similar to a bull fight, is conducted near this village during the Pongal festival season, which occurs during the middle of January (usually 14th). Many people from around India come here during this festival to visit the Jallikattu.

The main agricultural crops are rice, sugar cane, coconut and plantains. Climate is moderate with no extremes.

This place is well irrigated by Periyar sub canal.
