= Vadipatti =

T. Vadipatti
- Town
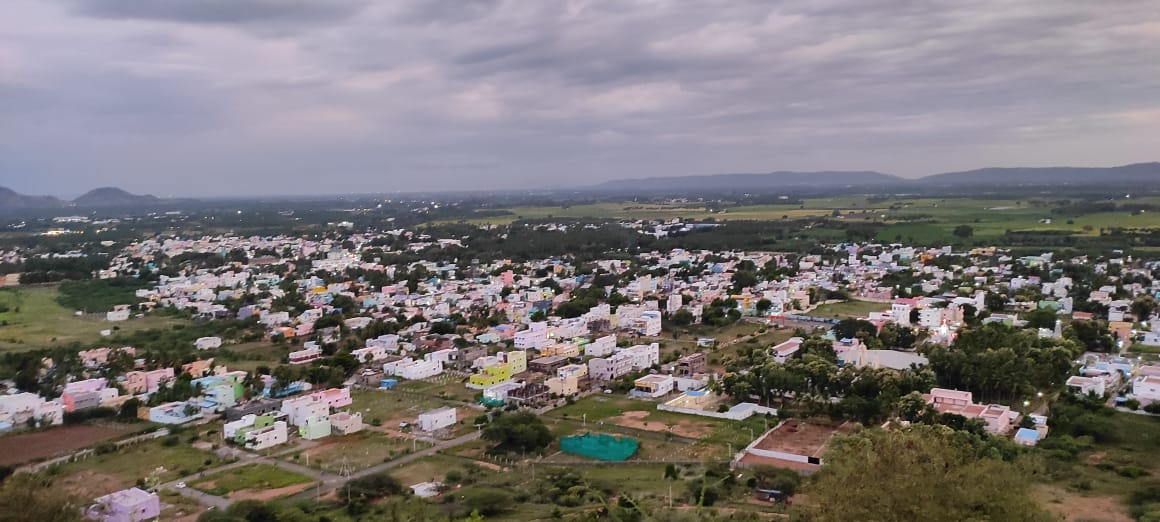
- Nickname: Vaadivasal
- Location in Tamil Nadu, India
- Coordinates: 10.084305°N 77.963448°E
- Country: India
- State: Tamil Nadu
- District: Madurai

Government
  - Type: Special grade Panchayat Town
  - Body: T. Vadipatti Sirapunilai Peruratchi

Population (2021)
  - Total: 30,800
- Demonym: Vadipattians

Languages
  - Official: Tamil
- Time zone: UTC+5:30 (IST)
- PIN: 625218
- Vehicle registration: TN-59
- Website: www.vadipatti.com

T. Vadipatti is a special grade panchayat town in the Madurai district in the Indian state of Tamil Nadu.and also known as "west gateway of Madurai.

== Etymology ==
The name T. Vadipatti derives from the root vaayil or vaasal, meaning 'the door' or 'entrance'. It was one of the historical boundaries and entrance to Madurai and the camping place of Pandyas, which is evident from the Kulasekara Pandian period.

== History ==
The town celebrates the festivals Jallikattu, Manju Virattu, and Erudhukattu Vizha.

== Geography ==
The bifurcated river of Vaigai (aka Mullai Periyaru Irrigational Channel) runs south of this small township. There is a nearby village called Kulasekaran Kottai, where the palace of Kulasekara Pandian of the Pandya Dynasty was located; the Meenakshi temple constructed by him still exists. Ponnaiah malai is also located in this town.

== Demographics ==
As of the 2001 Indian census, T. Vadipatti had a population of 21,780. Males and females each constitute 50% of the population. T. Vadipatti has an average literacy rate of 68%, higher than the national average of 59.5%: male literacy is 77%, and female literacy is 61%. In T. Vadipatti, 10% of the population is under six years of age.

== Politics ==
T. Vadipatti comes under the Assembly Constituency of Sholavandan. Sholavandan Assembly Constituency is a part of Theni (Lok Sabha constituency).

== Overview ==
Its paddy field and plantain field are agricultural sources for local residents. The village holds its weekly market every Tuesday.

The main village of L Pudur is located near the bus stand. Other small villages such as Neeratha, Thatampatti, Bodinayyakanpatti, Ramanayakan pttu, Kulasekeran Kotai, Katchakatti, and Virallipatti have become a part of the larger town. The Pariyar River flows through T. Vadipatti's farmlands which prominently produces paddy, banana and coconut trees. The farming area is green year-round due to the river and the fertile land and water. There are old temples including Meenakashi Amman Temple, Puthadiyaan Temple aka Mettuperumaal Temple, Navaneedha Perumal Temple in the main area, and the Aadhi Ayyanaar Temple on the bank of the Mullai Periyar Channel. For 100 years, Vaikasi Visakam Festival has been celebrated in Balathandayuthabani Murugan Koil in T. Vadipatti; Vallapa Ganapathi Koil is also located in T. Vadipatti. The town also has a church and masque, showing its religious diversity in a Pandya city.

T. Vadipatti is a taluk headquarters and excels in education, sports and industry. The Thaai institution provides education for all students, from pre-kindergarten to post-graduation. It has preschool, primary, secondary, higher secondary schools catering to both the CBSE syllabus and matriculation syllabus to 12th standard. Thaai also has a polytechnic college and arts and science college for women under its higher education segment. All education activities are integrated in a well-secured campus with numerous grounds and sport activities. Other notable schools, apart from the Boys' and Girls' Higher Secondary School run by the Tamil Nadu Government, are Fiscos Matric, Venkatajalapaty Matric, and Charles. T. Vadipatti has produced numerous hockey players, of which a few have represented at the national level, as well as notable names in defense, banking, and auditing PSUs. Cricket is one other sport which is popular alongside badminton and football.

== Industries and higher education ==
=== Industries ===
T. Vadipatti is surrounded by the following industries and is connected to T. Vadipatti Railway Station (freight-loading hub), the Madurai Airport (40 km (25 mi) and 45 minutes away by road) and Tuticorin Seaport (240 km (150 mi), taking around two and a half hours):

- TAFE, tractor manufacturers
- Madurai Integrated Textile Park
- Dindugul SIPCOT (next to TAFE)
- Kappalur Industrial Park, including Madurai IT Hub
- All India Institutes of Medical Sciences (AIIMS), Madurai
- Allanganallur Sugarcane Factory

and numerous industries consisting of various small and medium-sized enterprises, from warehousing, cold storage, rubber components, to confectionery, etc.

=== Hospitals ===
The following specialty hospitals are located in the area:

- Appolo Hospitals
- Vellamal Hospitals
- Vadamalayan Hospitals
- AIIMS

=== Higher education ===
Notable higher education colleges by bus include

==== Medicine ====
- Madurai Medical College
- Vellammal Medical College
- AIIMS in Madurai

Others within an hour drive are Theni Medical College, Dindugual Medical College, and Virudunagar Medical College.

==== Engineering colleges ====
- Thiagaraja Engineering College

==== Arts and science ====
- Yadava College
- American College
- Fatima College
- Mangayarkarasi College

== See also ==
- Semmanipatti
- Alanganallur
- Kutladampatti Falls
- Ramarajapuram
- Sembukudipatti
