= Sirumalai Hill Banana =

Banana from the Western Ghats in India

- Geographical indication
- Description: Bananas from Sirumalai region
- Type: Agricultural
- Area: Sirumalai, Dindigul district, Tamil Nadu
- Country: India
- Registered: 2008–09

Sirumalai Hill Banana is a type of banana grown in the Sirumalai region in the Palani Hills of the Western Ghats in the Indian state of Tamil Nadu. It was declared as a geographical indication in 2008–09.

== Description ==
The banana is cultivated at altitudes of 2,500–3,000 ft (760–910 m) along the Western Ghats. It is often grown as a rain-fed crop on loamy soil with a pH range of 5.5 to 6.5. The plantain trees are grown during July–August during the South-west monsoon season and may be grown along with other plants in coffee or timber plantations. The trees grow up to 10 ft (3.0 m) tall and the crop is harvested after eight months. Over the past decade, the variety has been severely affected by banana bunchy top virus with various steps taken to alleviate the same.

The fruit is known for its unique smell and flavor. The ripe fruits are yellowish in color with a thicker peel. The fruits can be stored for up to ten days at the right temperature conditions. The fruit pulp is slightly harder with less moisture content, large sugar content (230 brix), and high potassium.
