= Illeism =

Act of referring to oneself in the third person

Baseball player Rickey Henderson famously referred to himself in the third person throughout his career.

Illeism (/ˈɪli.ɪzəm/; from Latin ille: "he; that man") is the act of referring to oneself in the third person instead of first person. It is sometimes used in literature as a stylistic device. In real-life usage, illeism can reflect a number of different stylistic intentions or involuntary circumstances.

== In literature ==
Early literature such as Julius Caesar's Commentarii de Bello Gallico or Xenophon's Anabasis, both ostensibly non-fictional accounts of wars led by their authors, used illeism to impart an air of objective impartiality, which included justifications of the author's actions. In this way personal bias is presented, albeit dishonestly, as objectivity.

In an essay, theologian Richard B. Hays challenged earlier findings that he disagrees with: "These were the findings of one Richard B. Hays, and the newer essay treats the earlier work and earlier author at arms' length."

Illeism may also be used to show idiocy, as with the character Mongo in Blazing Saddles, e.g. "Mongo like candy" and "Mongo only pawn in game of life", though it may also show innocent simplicity, as it does with Harry Potter's Dobby the Elf ("Dobby has come to protect, even if he does have to shut his ears in the oven door"). The childlike Sesame Street Muppet character Elmo almost exclusively speaks in the third person.

In the Babylonian Talmud and related texts, illeism is used extensively, often taking the form of the speaker utilizing the expression hahu gavra ("That man") when referring to himself.

Salman Rushdie used the device in his memoir Joseph Anton.

== In everyday speech ==
In different contexts, illeism can be used to reinforce self-promotion, as used to sometimes comic effect by Bob Dole throughout his political career ("When the president is ready to deploy, Bob Dole is ready to lead the fight on the Senate Floor", Bob Dole speaking about the Strategic Defense Initiative at the NCPAC convention, 1987). This was particularly made notable during the United States presidential election of 1996 and lampooned broadly in popular media for years afterwards. Deepanjana Pal of Firstpost noted that speaking in the third person "is a classic technique used by generations of Bollywood scriptwriters to establish a character's aristocracy, power and gravitas".

On the other hand, third person self-referral can be associated with self-deprecation, irony, and not taking oneself too seriously (since the excessive use of the pronoun "I" is often seen as a sign of narcissism and egocentrism), as well as with eccentricity in general. Psychological studies show that thinking and speaking of oneself in the third person increases wisdom and has a positive effect on one's mental state because an individual who does so is more intellectually humble, more capable of empathy and understanding the perspectives of others, and is able to distance themself emotionally from their problems.

Accordingly, in certain Eastern religions, like Hinduism, illeism is sometimes seen as a sign of enlightenment, since through it, an individual detaches their eternal self (atman) from their bodily form; in particular, Jnana yoga encourages its practitioners to refer to themselves in the third person. Known illeists of that sort include Swami Ramdas, Anandamayi Ma, and Mata Amritanandamayi.

A number of celebrities, including Marilyn Monroe, Alice Cooper, and Deanna Durbin, referred to themselves in the third person to distance their public persona from their actual self. Mary J. Blige, in her song "Family Affair", introduces herself in the third person.

Some parents use illeism (refer to themselves as "Daddy" or "Mommy") because very young children may not yet understand that the pronouns "I" and "you" refer to different people based on context. Toddlers acquiring speech often refer to themselves in the third person before learning proper usage of the pronoun "I", and their speech evolves past using illeism once they develop a strong sense of self-recognition, often before age two.

In Japanese, children may refer to themselves by their name, girls in particular. Furthermore, Japanese women may refer to themselves by their name to appear cute or childish. This practice is associated with burikko, a Japanese term for women who put on an affect of cuteness.

== Notable illeists ==
=== Real people ===
==== Politics and military ====
- Xenophon's (c. 430–355/356 BC) Anabasis (ca. 370 BC) where the author puts the description of his own military campaign into Asia Minor and back under the pen of an otherwise unknown "Themistogenes of Syracuse" — see above, and also Anabasis (Xenophon)#Authorship.
- Julius Caesar's (100– 44 BC) Commentarii de Bello Gallico (58–49 BC) present the author's exploits in the Gallic War in the third person.
- Henry Adams (1838–1918), historian, author and descendant of presidents John Adams and John Quincy Adams, throughout his autobiography The Education of Henry Adams (1918)
- Joseph Stalin (1878–1953)
- Douglas MacArthur (1880–1964) was known to refer to himself as "MacArthur" in telling stories involving himself
- Charles de Gaulle (1890–1970), President of France (1959–1969)
- Richard Nixon (1913–1994), 37th President of the United States (1969–1974)
- Bob Dole (1923–2021), during his United States presidential campaign in 1996
- Mikhail Gorbachev (1931–2022), Leader of the USSR (1985–1991)
- Paulo Maluf (born 1931), Brazilian politician
- Muammar Gaddafi (1942–2011)
- Donald Trump (born 1946), President of the United States (2017–2021, 2025–present)
- Silvio Berlusconi (1936–2023), Prime Minister of Italy (1994–1995; 2001–2006; 2008–2011)
- Herman Cain (1945–2020), during his United States presidential campaign in 2012
- Narendra Modi (born 1950), Prime Minister of India (2014–present)
- Anthony Garotinho (born 1960), Brazilian politician
- Roy Kwong Chun-yu (born 1983), District Councilor and legislator of Hong Kong
- Chen Shui-bian (born 1950), President of the Republic of China (Taiwan) (2000–2008)
- Mark Robinson (born 1968), Lieutenant Governor of North Carolina (2021–2025)
- Eric Adams (born 1960), Mayor of New York City (2022–2025)

==== Sports ====
- Cristiano Ronaldo (born 1985) has often referred to himself as "Cristiano". One example came after Portugal's 0–1 Round of 16 defeat to Spain at the 2026 FIFA World Cup when he said that "before Cristiano, Portugal did not win a single title in history".
- Johnny Cueto (born 1986) gave a post-game interview in the third person, after pitching Game 5 of the 2015 ALDS.
- Zlatan Ibrahimović (born 1981), Swedish footballer
- LeBron James (born 1984) made several references to himself in the third person during The Decision program on ESPN in 2010.
- Rickey Henderson (1958–2024), baseball left fielder, often referred to himself as “Rickey."
- Dwayne Johnson (born 1972), professional wrestler, referenced himself in the third person as The Rock during his career, particularly with his trash-talking promos.
- Karl Malone (born 1963), basketball player
- Diego Maradona (1960–2020), Argentinian footballer
- Lothar Matthäus (born 1961), German football manager and former player, is quoted with the phrase: "A Lothar Matthäus does not let himself be beaten by his body. A Lothar Matthäus decides on his fate himself."
- Cam Newton (born 1989), NFL quarterback, referred to himself in third person during his press conference at the NFL Combine in 2011.
- Pelé (1940–2022), Brazilian footballer

==== Entertainment ====
- Alice Cooper (born 1948)
- Alain Delon (1935–2024)
- Alix Earle (born 2000)
- Flavor Flav (born 1959)
- Gina Lollobrigida (1927–2023)
- Hedy Lamarr (1914–2000)
- Sylva Koscina (1933–1994)
- Kinky Friedman (1944–2024)
- Jamie Hyneman (born 1956)
- Jean Harlow (1911–1937)
- Jerry Lewis (1926–2017)
- Deanna Durbin (1921–2013)
- Marilyn Monroe (1926–1962)
- Lila Morillo (born 1940)
- Mister Lobo (born 1970)
- Mr. T (born 1952)
- Mae West (1893–1980)
- MF Doom (1971–2020), British-American rapper and record producer. His persona was partly inspired by Doctor Doom, a fictional illeist.
- Noel Edmonds (born 1948), English television presenter, radio DJ, writer, producer and businessman

==== Religion and spirituality ====
- Anandamayi Ma (1896–1982)
- Bhaktivinoda Thakur (1838-1914)
- Buddha sometimes referred to himself as either "The Buddha" or "The Tathagata."
- Sathya Sai Baba (1926–2011)
- Mata Amritanandamayi (born 1953)
- Narottama Dasa (born 1520)
- Swami Ramanagiri (1921–1955)
- Swami Ramdas (1884–1963), Indian saint, philosopher, philanthropist and pilgrim
- Rama Tirtha (1873–1906), Indian teacher of Vedanta
- Ma Yoga Laxmi, the secretary of Osho
- Jesus Christ is found referring to himself as "Jesus" (as well as the "Son of Man"), as in John 17:1–3.

==== Other ====
- Salvador Dalí (1904–1989) in his interview with Mike Wallace, also known as The Mike Wallace Interview, on April 19, 1958.
- Norman Mailer's (1923–2007) non-fiction work The Fight (1975) refers to the author in the third person throughout, explaining why he has chosen to do so at the beginning of the book.
- George Remus (1876–1952), American lawyer and bootlegger.

=== Fictional characters ===
==== Books ====
- Major Bagstock, the apoplectic retired Indian army officer in Charles Dickens' Dombey and Son (1848), refers to himself solely as Joseph, Old Joe, Joey B, Bagstock, Josh, J.B., Anthony Bagstock, and other variants of his own name.
- Captain Hook in J. M. Barrie's Peter Pan and Wendy (1911): "'Better for Hook,' he cried, 'if he had had less ambition!' It was in his darkest hours only that he referred to himself in the third person."
- Winnetou, a Native American character in the eponymous novel by Karl May.
- Hercule Poirot, a fictional Belgian detective created by British writer Agatha Christie, usually refers to himself in the third person.
- Gollum in The Lord of the Rings (1954–55) spoke in an idiosyncratic manner, often referring to himself in the third person, and frequently talked to himself—"through having no one else to speak to", as Tolkien put it in The Hobbit.
- Charlie Gordon in the acclaimed novel Flowers for Algernon (1959) speaks in third person in the "being outside one's body and watching things happen" manner in his flashbacks to his abusive and troubled childhood suffering from phenylketonuria.
- Boday, a quirky female artist in Jack Chalker's Changewinds trilogy (1987–88).
- Y. T., a teenage girl in Snow Crash (1992) by Neal Stephenson.
- Bast the Wood Elf in The Council Wars series by John Ringo.
- The healer and wisewoman Magda Digby in the Owen Archer series (1993–2019) by Candace Robb.
- Jaqen H'ghar, an assassin of the Faceless Men in the fantasy suite A Song of Ice and Fire (1996–), consistently refers to himself ("a man") as well as frequently the person he is addressing (e.g. "a girl") in impersonal, third person form, and never by name.
- Dobby the House-Elf in the Harry Potter series (1997–2007).
- Ramona, the housekeeper and mentor in Silver Ravenwolf's Witches Chillers series (2000–01).
- The old man Nakata in Haruki Murakami's Kafka on the Shore (2002).
- Tigger in the Winnie the Pooh books, films and television series frequently refers to himself in the third-person plural, e.g. "That's what Tiggers do best!"
- At least in the book versions of Rumpole of the Bailey, protagonist Horace Rumpole sometimes narrates Rumpole's fate in the third person.
- Herbert Stencil, a major character within Thomas Pynchon's novel V. refers to himself as Stencil and speaks in the third person.

==== Comics ====
- Doctor Doom is known for more often than not referring to himself as "Doom" instead of "me" or "I".
- The Hulk
- Groot. Initially, he can say only one phrase "I am Groot", but during the "Infinity Countdown" storyline, he regains the ability to speak in full sentences, and begins to refer to himself in the third person.
- Solomon Grundy
- Mantis almost always refers to herself as "Mantis", "she", and "this one"; this has to do with her upbringing at the Temple of the Priests of Pama, an alien pacifistic sect heavily inspired by real-life Eastern religious movements.
- Namor

==== Television ====
- Elmo from Sesame Street (1980–present), whose speech is intended to mimic the speech of preschoolers. Elmo's third-person speech is similarly adopted by younger Muppet characters in many of the show's international co-productions, including Lola from Plaza Sésamo in Mexico & Hispanic America, Chaos from Sesame Park in Canada, Avigail from Rechov Sumsum in Israel, and Tonton from Hikayat Simsim in Jordan.
- Brian "Bomber" Busbridge, played by Pat Roach, in Auf Wiedersehen, Pet (1983–2004)
- Disco Stu and Duffman from The Simpsons (1989–present).
- Bryan Strauchan (a character portrayed by Peter Helliar)
- Yoshi in Super Mario World (1991)
- Waspinator in Beast Wars: Transformers (1996–99)
- Uncle Chan, from the animated series Jackie Chan Adventures (2000–2005)
- The Flea from Mucha Lucha.
- Nick Mallory from Grojband.
- Jimmy from the episode "The Jimmy" (1995) of Seinfeld (1989–98), whose usage leads to confusion about his identity. The usage rubs off on George Costanza, who exclaims "George is getting upset!"
- Bob, played by Saverio Guerra, in Becker (1998–2004)
- Zathras from Babylon 5.
- Ugh the caveman from Dino Boy.
- Java the caveman from Martin Mystery.
- Ackbar from Disney's Aladdin TV series.
- Mossy from Sofia the First.
- Rolf from Cartoon Network animated series Ed, Edd n Eddy (1999–2009)
- Stick-up man Omar Little from The Wire (2002–08). Examples include "Omar don't scare" and "Omar listening".
- Numbuh 5 from the Cartoon Network animated series Codename: Kids Next Door (2002–08).
- Frank Jeffries, played by Matt Winston, in Grey's Anatomy (2005–present)
- Detective Eddie Alvarez from The Unusuals (2009)
- Kenny Powers, from the television show Eastbound & Down (2009–13)
- George Remus, a recurring character played by Glenn Fleshler, in Boardwalk Empire (2010–14)
- The Great and Powerful Trixie and Yona from the animated series My Little Pony: Friendship is Magic (2010–19)
- Hesh Hepplewhite from Sealab 2021.
- Lavon Hayes, the mayor from Hart of Dixie (2011–15).
- Lieutenant Terry Jeffords from Brooklyn Nine-Nine (2013–21)
- Ice Bear from the animated series We Bare Bears (2015–20)
- Bobgoblin from the animated series Wallykazam! (2014–17)
- Darkwing Duck from the titular animated series (1991–92)
- Treelo from Bear in the Big Blue House (1997–2006)
- Foo from The Save-Ums! (2003–05)
- Mr. Cook and his nephew Poco from Allegra's Window (1994–96)
- Remy LeBeau/Gambit in X-Men: The Animated Series and X-Men ’97
- Baby Pom in Fimbles (2002-2004)

==== Film ====
- E.T., the eponymous character from Stephen Spielberg's 1982 film.
- Mr. Miyagi from The Karate Kid (1984) sometimes refers to himself as "Miyagi".
- Magua from The Last of the Mohicans (1992)
- Jeffrey "The Dude" Lebowski from The Big Lebowski (1998)
- Dwight, from Fast & Furious (2009)
- Francesco Bernoulli, from Cars 2 (2011)
- Sid from Children of Men (2006)
- Spike from Little Giants (1994)

==== Manga and anime ====
- Sayuri Kurata from Kanon (1999–2000) speaks this way in order to separate herself from her past treatment of her little brother, which she regrets.
- Megumi Noda, aka Nodame, the title character from Nodame Cantabile (2001–09)
- Rika Shiguma from Haganai (2010–15)
- Juvia Lockser from Fairy Tail (2006–17)
- Majin Buu from Dragon Ball Z (1989–1996)
- Dio Brando from JoJo's Bizarre Adventure commonly refers to himself as "I, Dio", especially when boasting.
- Tom from Deltora Quest.
- Ed from Cowboy Bebop (1998–1999), particularly in the anime's English dub.
- Meme Bashame from My Deer Friend Nokotan
- Fuma Empress (Fūma Kōtarō VI) from Tenkaichi: The Greatest Warrior Under the Rising Sun
- Anya Forger from Spy × Family
- Kusuri Yakuzen from The 100 Girlfriends Who Really, Really, Really, Really, Really Love You

==== Video games ====
- Mario from the Super Mario series ("Mario number one!")
- Princess Peach from the Super Mario series (notably, "Peachy's got it!")
- Candice, the seventh Gym Leader in the Sinnoh region in Pokémon Diamond & Pearl, often uses illeism in her speech, such as "Candice is on fire!"
- Lyle in Animal Crossing
- Wiggler in Paper Mario: Sticker Star
- Mormo in Pirate101
- Bronya Zaychik in Honkai Impact 3rd
- Guzma, the leader of Team Skull in Pokémon Sun & Moon, frequently uses illeism; notable examples are "It's ya boy Guzma!" and "Guzmaaaaaaaaaaaaa! What's wrong with you?!"
- The Khajiit, a race of humanoid cats in The Elder Scrolls, often refer to themselves in the third person, whether by name, or by saying 'this one' or 'Khajiit'.
- The Hanar, a race of sentient jellyfish in Mass Effect, refer to themselves as 'this one'. In their culture, it is narcissistic and rude to refer to oneself as 'I'.
- Rena Ryūgū in Higurashi When They Cry
- Paimon and Razor in Genshin Impact.
- M. Bison, the grand villain of Street Fighter gaming franchise, often refers to himself in third person such as "Master Bison" in order to emphasize his own ego and sense of self-importance.
- Jacob Lash in Deadlock
- Sora Harukawa in Ensemble Stars!
- Count Bleck in Super Paper Mario
- Fernando Martinez from the Grand Theft Auto series addresses himself in both first and third-person.
- Slackjaw in Dishonored
- Renne Bright from the Trails series refers to herself in the third person, most notably in her debut game The Legend of Heroes: Trails in the Sky SC.
- The Vortigaunts, a race of hive-minded aliens in the Half-Life series, refer to themselves as "this one", "we", or "us".
- The Fact Core, a corrupted core that Chell and GLaDOS place on Wheatley at the end of Portal 2, speaks in third person when bragging about himself.

== See also ==
- Royal we
- Nosism
