= Kutladampatti Falls =

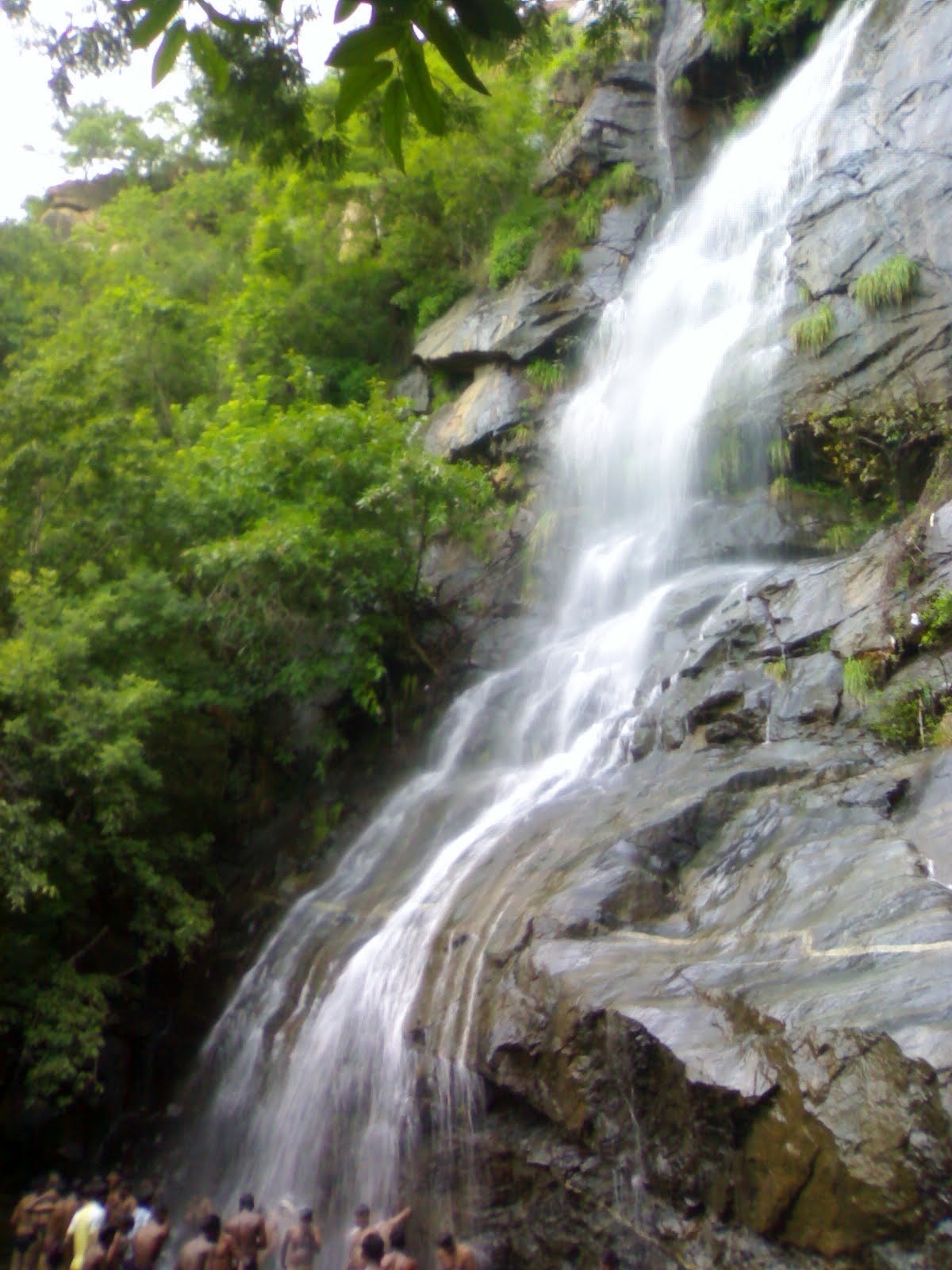
- Kutladampatti waterfalls, Vadipatti, Madurai
- Interactive map of Kutladampatti Falls
- Location: 30 km NW of Madurai
- Coordinates: 10.133704°N 78.017392°E
- Type: Waterfall
- Total height: 90 ft (27 m)
- Number of drops: 2

Kutladampatti Falls is a waterfall located in the village of Kutladampatti near Vadipatti in Madurai district about 30 km (19 mi) northwest of Madurai, Tamil Nadu, India. The waterfall is in a reserve forest managed by the Tamil Nadu Forest Department. The water falls from a height of about 27 metres (89 ft).

== Transportation ==
Tourists from Madurai can take a direct bus from the Periyar bus stand. Tourists may also come via Vadipatti, travelling by bus number 71. The falls are 8 km (5.0 mi) from Vadipatti. State Mini bus services are available from the Vadipatti bus stand.

== Tourism ==
The number of tourist visits peaks from September to February. Public transportation was instituted following some serious media coverage in the early 2000s. Construction of pavement and steps leading to the falls was undertaken by the local administration. Many Maduraites spend their weekends at the falls. The waterfall goes dry in the summer or in the absence of rain. Swami Ramanagiri Ashram is another place of attraction, located in the downhill. The Ashram is surrounded by mango farms and is a home for peacocks. The ashram also has various shrines and is a very good place for meditation and spiritual relief.

In order to promote this waterfalls as a famous tourist destination and attract more tourists, the Department of Tourism, Government of Tamil Nadu, has taken a number of measures including construction of 2 km trek to this fall for the convenience of the trekkers.

== Gallery ==
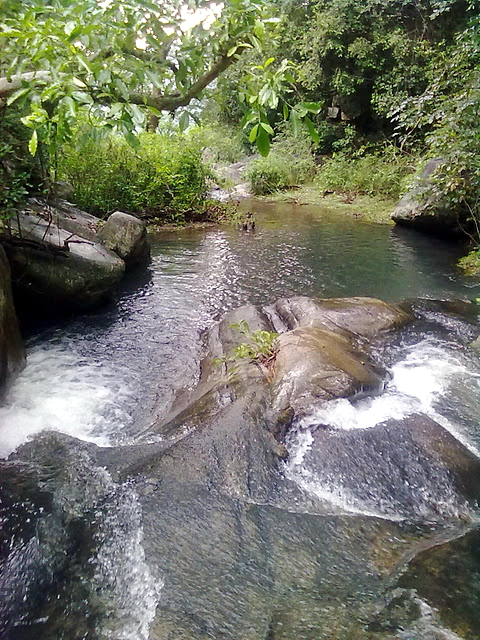

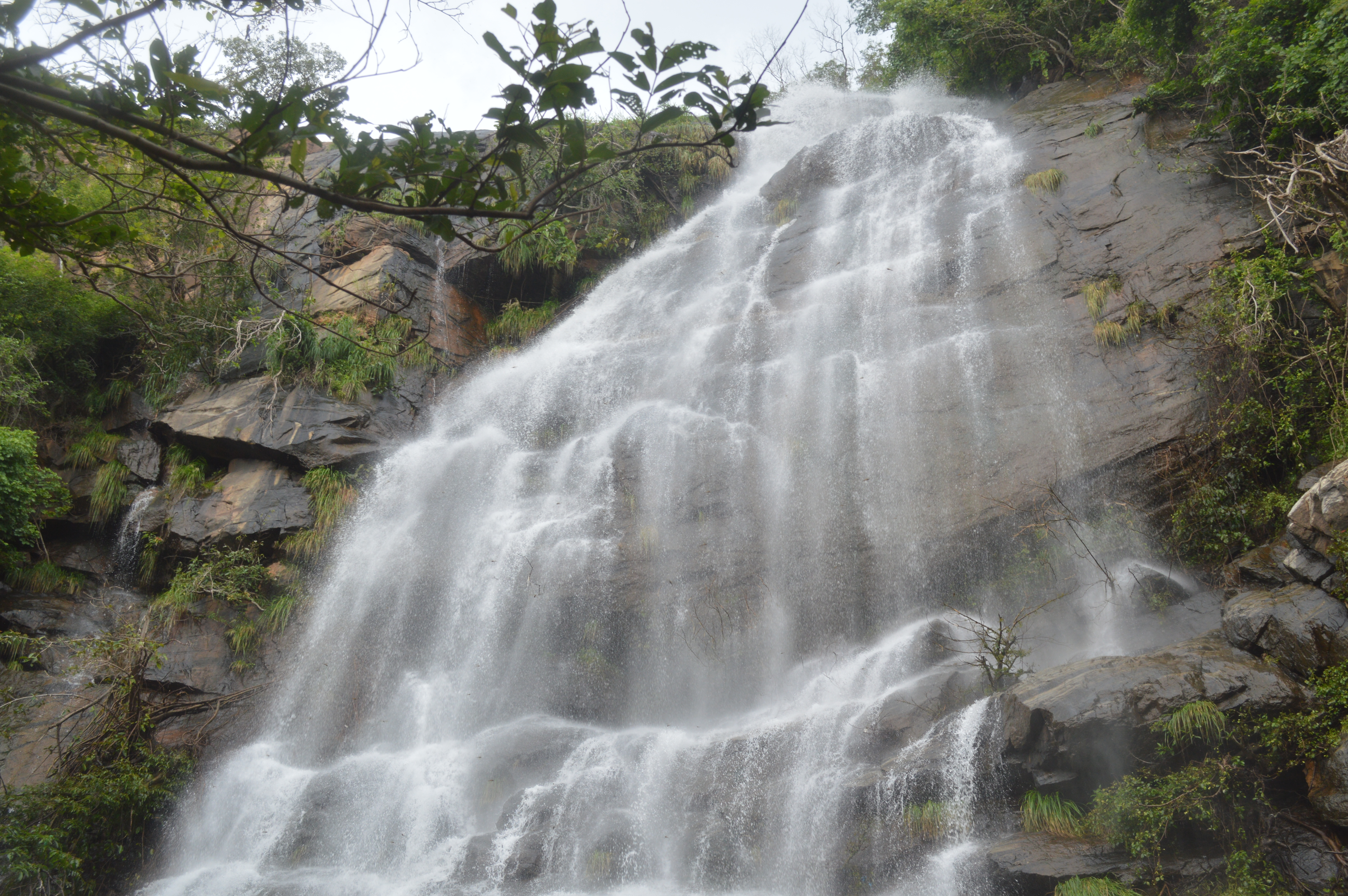

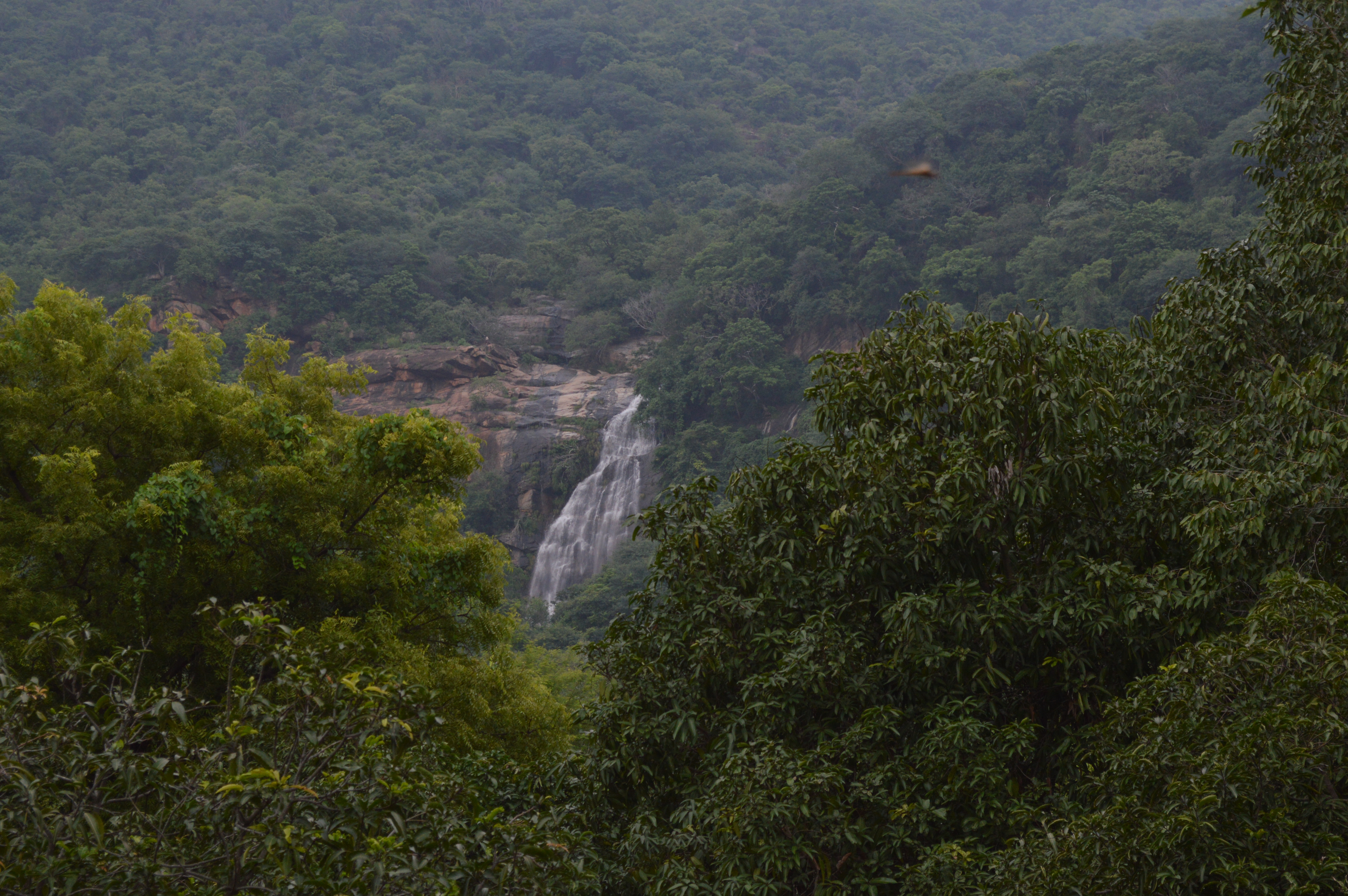

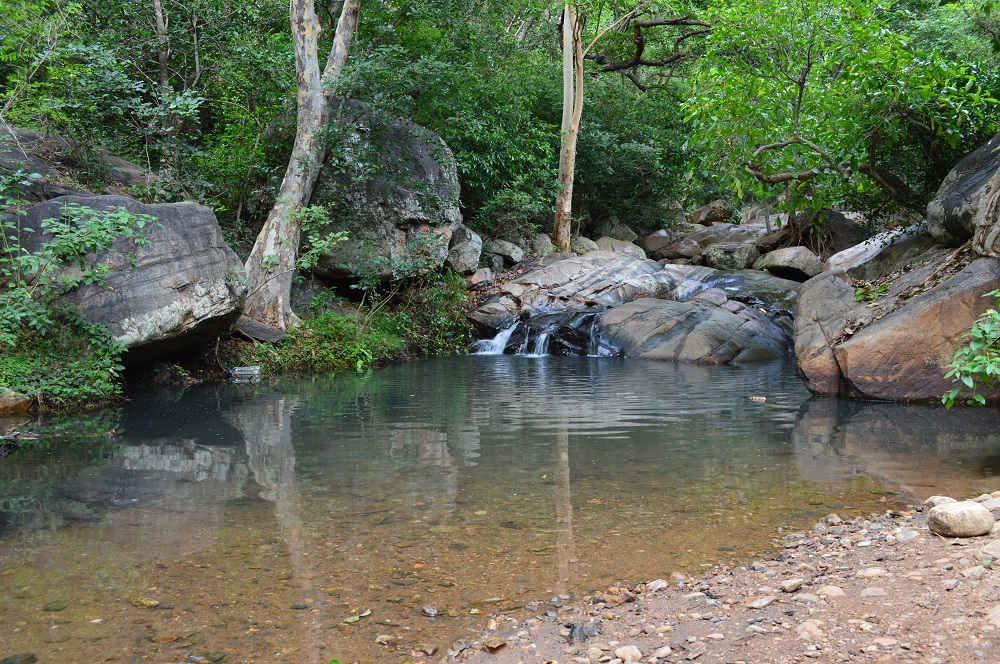

== See also ==
- List of waterfalls
- List of waterfalls in India
