= Ramarajapuram =

- village
- Nickname: Rama
- Interactive map of Ramarajapuram
- Country: India
- State: Tamil Nadu

Languages
  - Official: Tamil
- Time zone: UTC+5:30 (IST)

Ramarajapuram is a village panchayat in Nilakkottai taluk, Dindigul district of the Indian state of Tamil Nadu.

== Demographics ==
As of the 2001 India census, Ramarajapuram had a population of 9,439. Males constitute 51% of the population and females 49%. Ramarajapuram has an average literacy rate of 60%, higher than the national average of 59.5% male literacy, and female literacy is 40%. In Ramarajapuram, 11% of the population is under 6 years of age.

== Facilities ==
It has five schools. According to Tamil Nadu Government's Department of School Education, the list of the schools include a government high school, two primary schools and a soman matriculation school.

Ramarajapuram has a rich supply of water and is situated on the bank of river Vaigai. Agriculture is the primary occupation of the population. Madurai and Dindigul are the major towns nearby.

This village has a government hospital. The children from the village travel to pandiarajpuram, Sholavandan, vadipatti for their education in English.

The village saw a lot of growth among the students leaving to complete higher education including BE, ME, CA, MBA, MCA etc. The fully agriculture dependent village is seeing a lot of growth by these younger generations and seeing few in Automobile and IT industry. This small village also has a tradition of sending many young men to the Indian army, CRPF, BSF, etc.

The village men play kabadi and a few among them are represented at state and national level teams. Cricket is also popular. A lot of tournaments are conducted. It is possible to see children playing carrom and chess in the streets.

A lot of people are in state police and fire services.
