= Vadipatti taluk =

Taluk in Tamil Nadu, India

Vadipatti is a taluk of Madurai district of the Indian state of Tamil Nadu. The headquarters of the taluk is the town of Vadipatti.

== Demographics ==
According to the 2011 census, the taluk of Vadipatti had a population of 238,453 with 119,517 males and 118,936 females. There were 995 women for every 1000 men. The taluk had a literacy rate of 69.22. Child population in the age group below 6 was 11,086 Males and 10,601 Females.
