= Vedasandur taluk =

Coordinates: 10°31′49″N 77°55′22″E

Vedasandur taluk is a taluk of Dindigul district of the Indian state of Tamil Nadu. The headquarters of the taluk is the town of Vedasandur.

== Demographics ==
According to the 2011 census, the taluk of Vedasandur had a population of 324,449 with 162,552 males and 161,897 females. There were 996 women for every 1000 men. The taluk had a literacy rate of 64.8. Child population in the age group below 6 was 16,539 Males and 15,127 Females.

== See also ==
- Mongupethanpatty
