= Alanganallur =

- Panchayat town
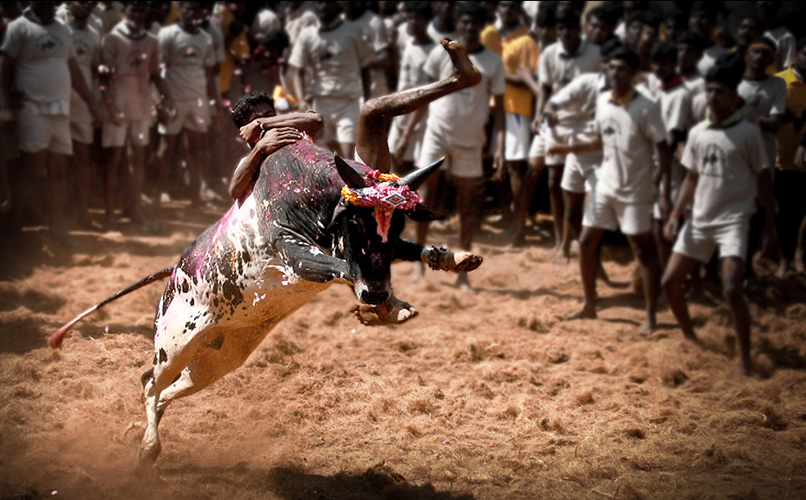
- Jallikattu at Alanganallur

- Location in Tamil Nadu, India
- Coordinates: 10°02′50.6″N 78°05′25.4″E
- Country: India
- State: Tamil Nadu
- District: Madurai

Area
  - Total: 4.8 km^{2} (1.9 sq mi)

Population (2011)
  - Total: 12,331
  - Density: 2,600/km^{2} (6,700/sq mi)

Languages
  - Official: Tamil
- Time zone: UTC+5:30 (IST)

Alanganallur is a panchayat town in Vadipatti taluk of Madurai district in the Indian state of Tamil Nadu. It is one of the nine panchayat towns in the district. Spread across an area of 4.8 km^{2} (1.9 sq mi), it had a population of 12,331 individuals as per the 2011 census. The town panchayat is notable for its jallikattu (bull taming) conducted during the festival of Pongal.

== Geography and administration ==
Alanganallur is located in Vadipatti taluk of Madurai district in the Indian state of Tamil Nadu. It is one of the nine panchayat towns in the district. Spread across an area of 4.8 km^{2} (1.9 sq mi), it is located on the highway connecting Madurai and Palamedu. The region has a tropical climate with hot summers and mild winters. The highest temperatures are recorded in April and May, with lowest recordings in December-January. The town panchayat is sub-divided into 15 wards. It is headed by a chairperson, who is elected by the members, who are chosen through direct elections. The town forms part of the Sholavandan Assembly constituency that elects its member to the Tamil Nadu legislative assembly and the Theni Lok Sabha constituency that elects its member to the Parliament of India.

== Demographics ==
As per the 2011 census, Alanganallur had a population of 12,331 individuals across 3,171 households. The population saw a marginal increase compared to the previous census in 2001 when 11,078 inhabitants were registered. The population consisted of 6,286 males and 6,045 females. About 1,261 individuals were below the age of six years. About 16.4% of the population belonged to scheduled castes. The entire population is classified as urban. The town has an average literacy rate of 78.7%.

About 39.4% of the eligible population were employed, of which majority were involved in agriculture and allied activities. Hinduism was the majority religion which was followed by 96.7% of the population, with Christianity (1.2%) and Islam (0.8%) being minor religions. The town panchayat is notable for its jallikattu (bull taming) conducted during the festival of Pongal.
