= Jallikattu =

Traditional bullfighting sport in Tamil Nadu, India

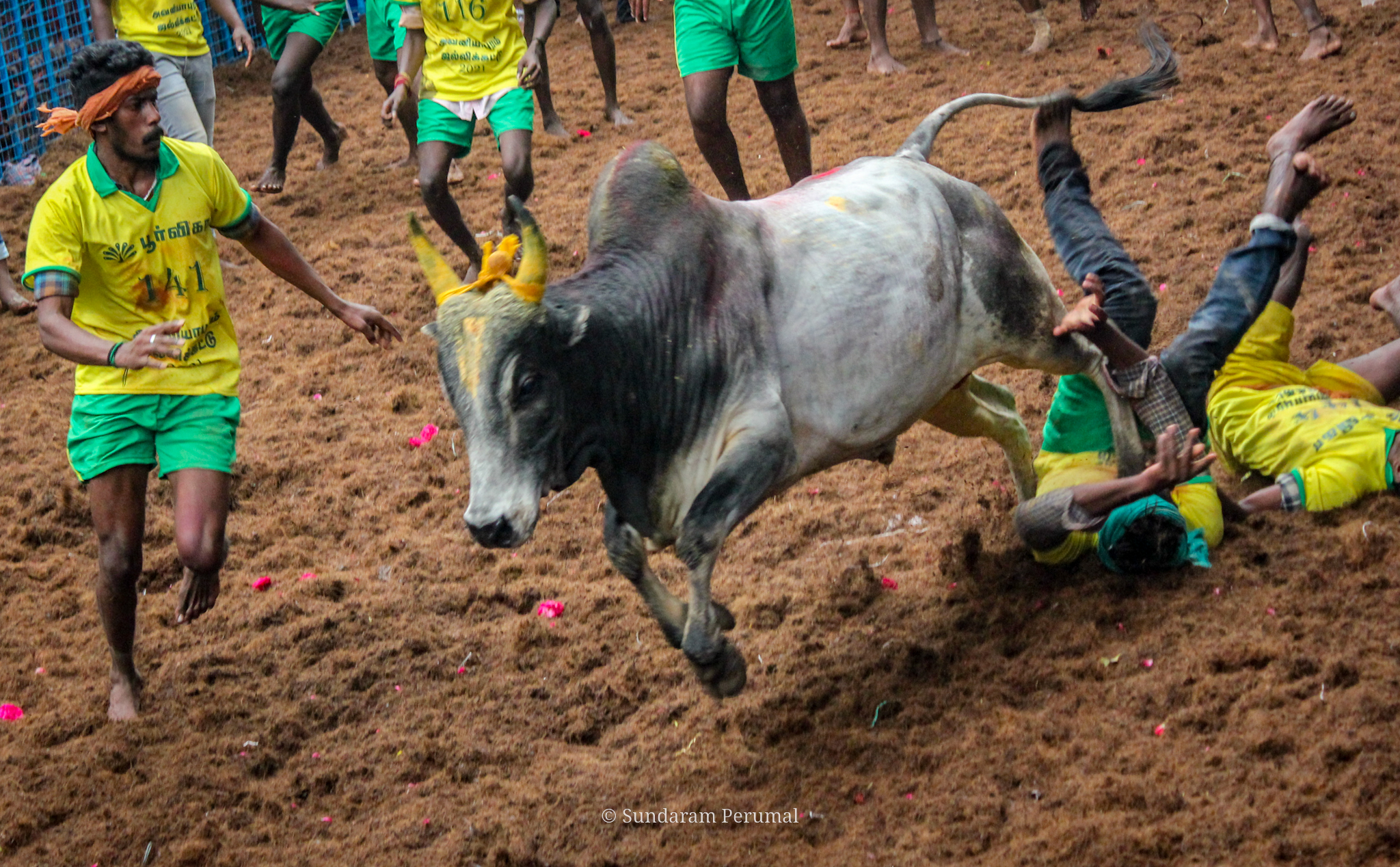
- Jallikattu being played in Madurai in 2021
- Highest governing body: Tamil Nadu Jallikattu Federation; Local organising committees
- Nicknames: Sallikkattu; ēru taḻuvuṭal; manju virattu
- First played: 600 –100 BCE

Characteristics
- Contact: Yes
- Team members: No teams, single competitors
- Mixed-sex: No
- Type: Traditional sport
- Venue: Open ground

Presence
- Country or region: Tamil Nadu, India
- Olympic: No
- Paralympic: No

Jallikattu (or Sallikkattu), also known as Eru Taḻuvuṭal and Manju-virattu, is a traditional event in which a zebu bull (Bos indicus), such as the Pulikulam or Kangayam breeds, is released into a crowd of people, and many people attempt to grab the large hump on the bull's back with both arms and hang on to it while the bull attempts to escape. They hold the hump for as long as possible, attempting to bring the bull to a stop. In some cases, they must ride long enough to remove flags on the bull's horns or cross a finish line.

Jallikattu is typically practised in some regions of the Indian state of Tamil Nadu, specifically in southern Tamil Nadu, as a part of Pongal celebrations on Mattu Pongal day, which occurs annually in January.

Because of incidents of injury and death associated with the sport, both to the participants and to the animals forced into it, animal rights organizations have called for a ban on the sport, resulting in the Supreme Court of India banning it several times over the past years. However, with protests from the people against the ban, a new ordinance was enacted in 2017 to continue the sport.

== Etymology ==
Ancient Tamil Sangams described the practice as ēru taḻuvuṭal (Tamil: ஏறு தழுவுதல்), literally 'bull embracing'. The modern term jallikattu (ஜல்லிக்கட்டு) or sallikattu (சல்லிக்கட்டு) is derived from salli ('coins') and kattu ('package'), which refers to a prize of coins that is tied to the bull's horns and that participants attempt to retrieve. Manju virattu (மஞ்சு விரட்டு) literally means 'bull chasing'.

== History ==
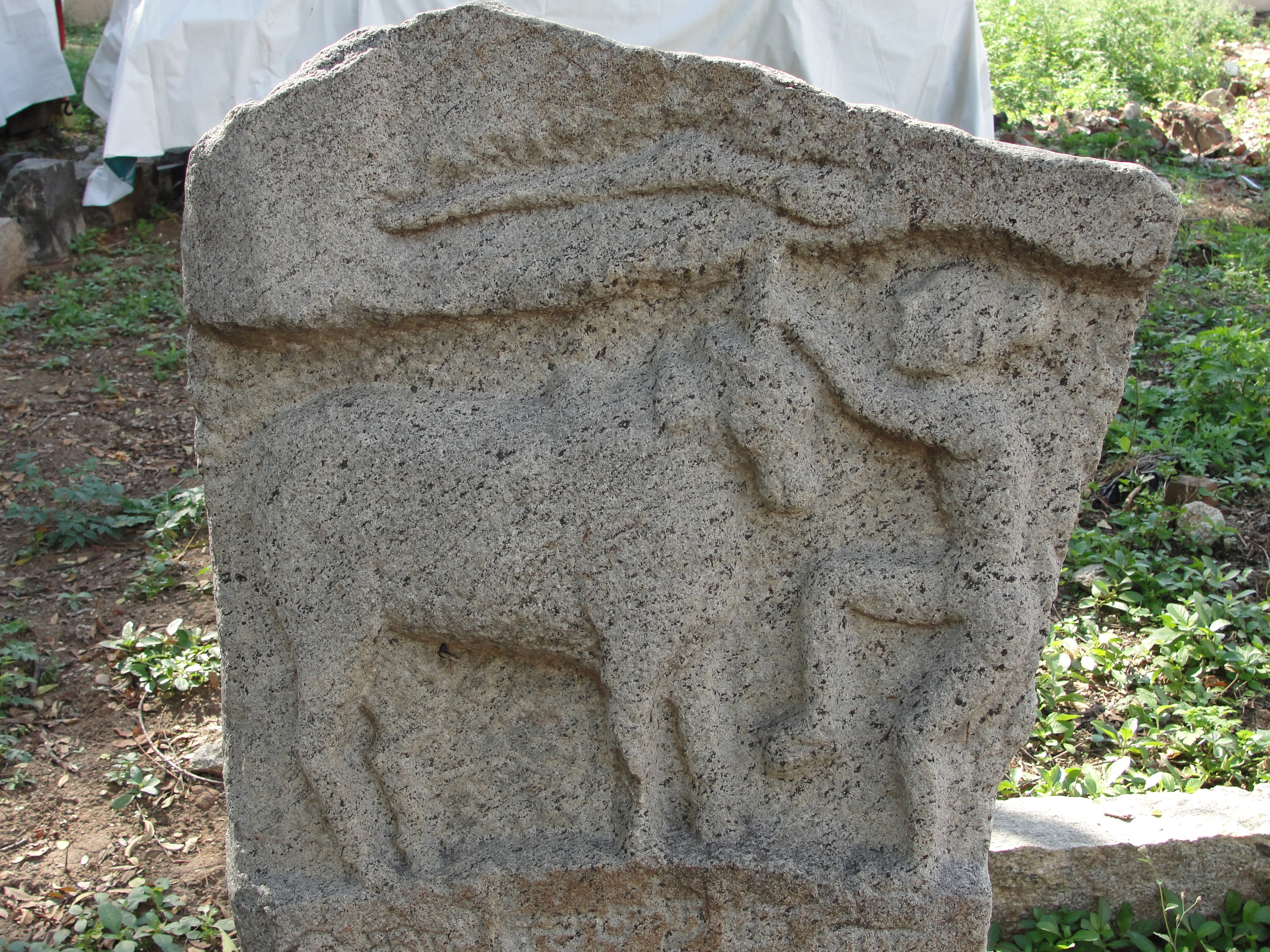
An inscription on eru thazhuvutal at government museum in Tamil Nadu

Jallikattu is known to have been practiced during the Tamil classical period (400–100 BCE). It was a cultural ritual among the Ayar tribal people who lived in the ‘Mullai’ geographical region of the ancient Tamil Nadu. Later, it became a platform for display of bravery, and prize money was introduced for participation encouragement. A seal from the Indus Valley Civilization depicting the practice is preserved in the National Museum, New Delhi.

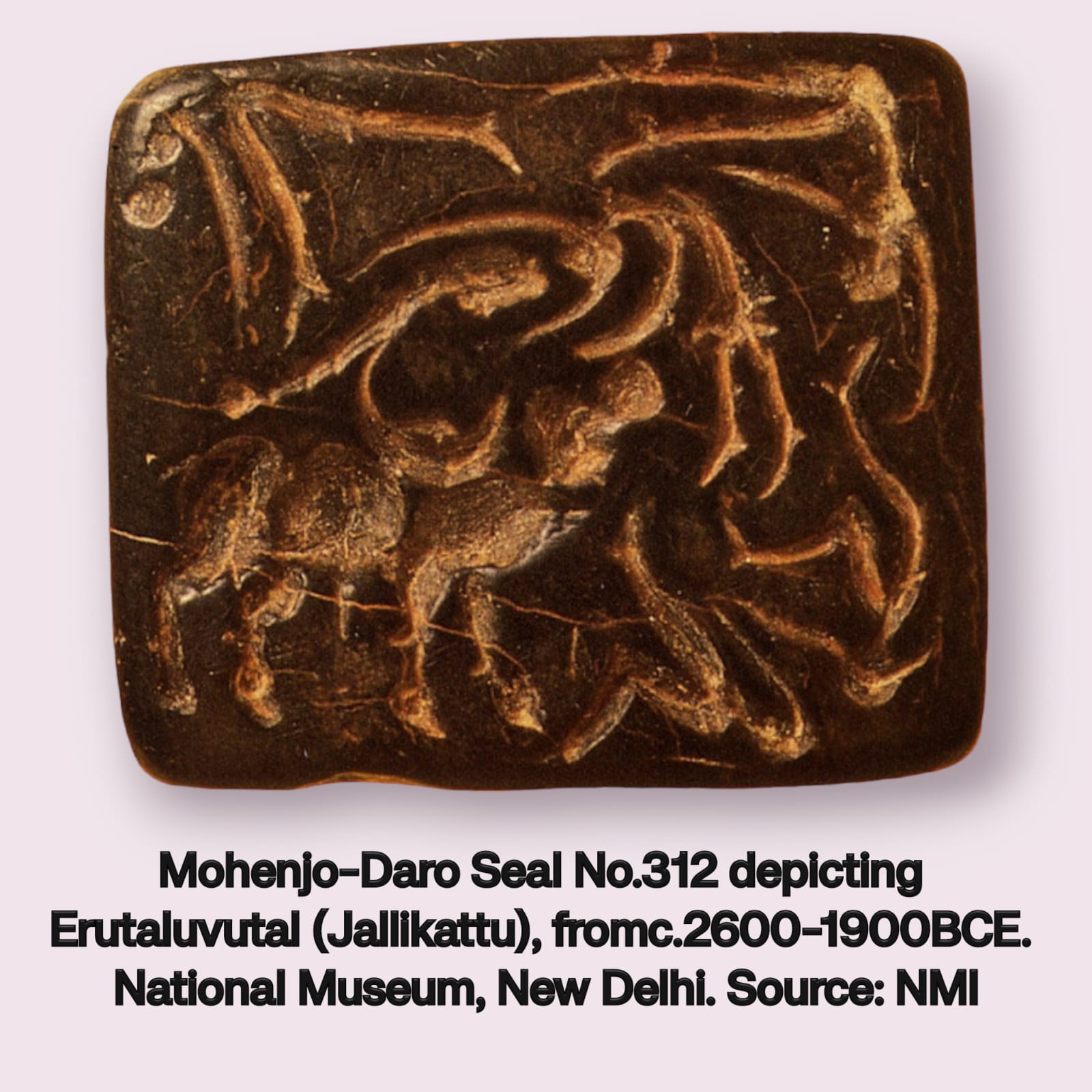
Indus Valley seal depicting Eru Thazhuvuthal

A cave painting in white kaolin discovered near Madurai depicting a lone man trying to control a bull is estimated to be about 1,500 years old.

An ancient tin coin discovered by a numismatist could be a fresh evidence of Jallikattu. R. Krishnamurthy, president of the South Indian Numismatic Society, estimated that the coin belongs to third or fourth century BCE. Since the coin was made of tin, which was then available only in South-East Asian countries.

Jallikkattus are very common between Thanjavur and Tiruchirappalli in the north and Tirunelveli and Ramanathapuram in the south, a region centered around the city of Madurai and populated for the most part by the Mukkulathor castes, who are the main participants in this ritual sport. Other landowning intermediate caste groups also enthusiastically participate, many of them bull owners and bull tamers.

In the Pudukkottai State, the Jallikattu was considered as a quasi religious function to be conducted to propitiate the village deities, and was usually held on any day after the Thai Pongal when harvesting was over and before the commencement of the Tamil New Year.

== Jallikattu venues ==
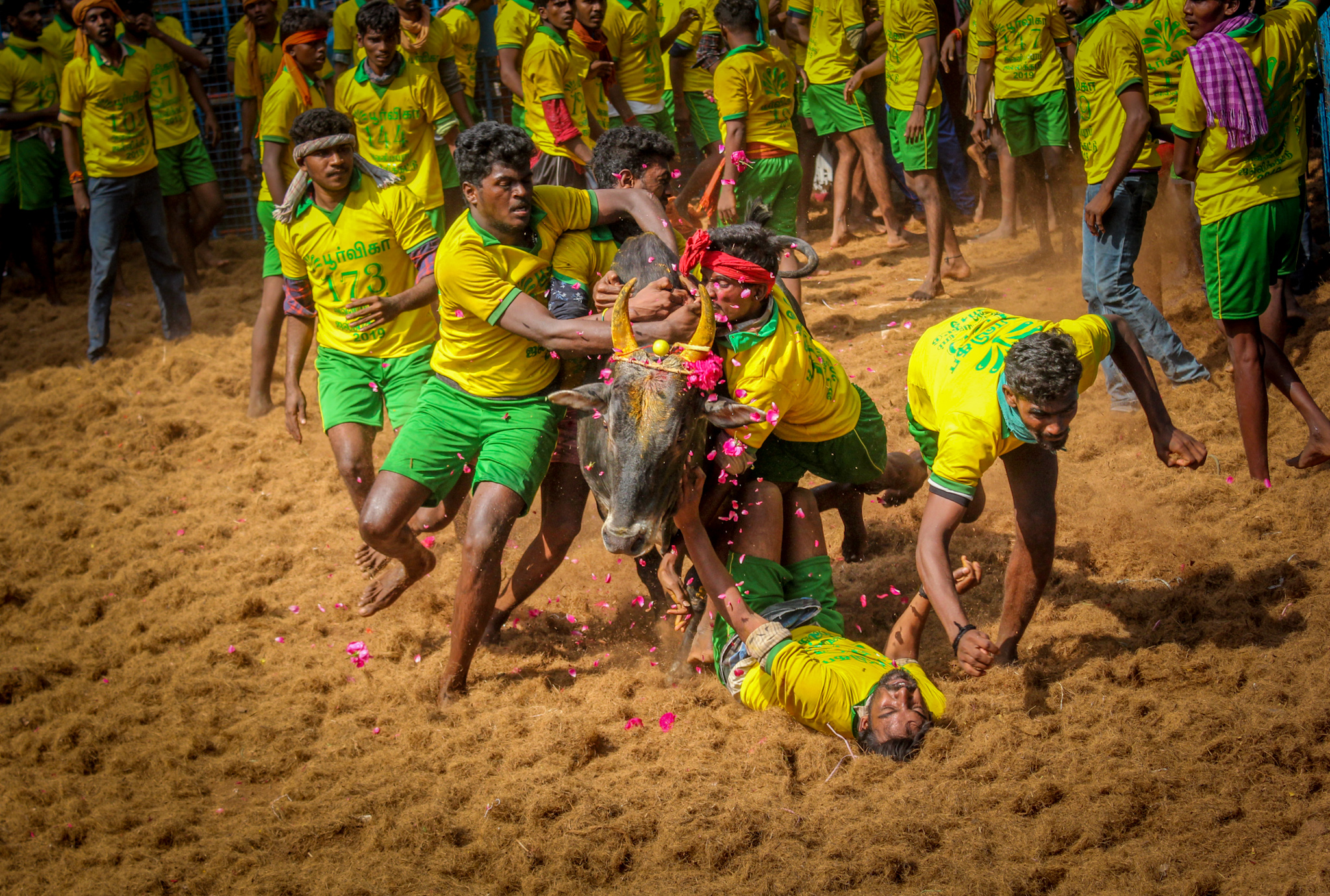
Jallikattu in Tamil Nadu in 2019

Well-known jallikattu venues include the following:

Venue	District
Alanganallur	Madurai
Avaniyapuram	Madurai
Palamedu	Madurai
Thammampatti	Salem
Vanniyan Viduthy	Pudukkottai
Thiruvapur	Pudukkottai
Vendanpatti	Pudukkottai
Siravayal	Sivagangai
Kandupatti	Sivagangai
Araliparai (unique hillock view)	Sivagangai
Pallavarayanpatty	Theni
Neikarapatti	Dindigul
Malayadipatty	Trichy
Sooriyur	Trichy
Allithurai	Trichy
Madhakottai	Thanjavur
Thirukkanurpatti	Thanjavur
Alagumalai	Tirupur
Vellalore	Coimbatore
Pagalathampalayam	Erode
Rachandar Thirumalai	Karur
Thogaimalai	Karur

Out of these the Alanganallur Jallikattu is considered to be the most famous venue.

== Variants and rules ==
Some variants include:

- Vadi manjuviraṭṭu: This is the most common category of jallikattu. The bull is released from a closed space (vadi vasal) and the contestants attempt to wrap their arms or hands around the hump of the bull and hold on to it to win the award. Only one person is allowed to attempt at a time. This variant is most common in the districts of Madurai, Theni, Thanjavur, and Salem.
- Vēli viraṭṭu: In this variant the approach is slightly different as the bull is directly released into open ground. The rules are the same as that of vadi majuviraṭṭu. This is a popular variant in the districts of Sivagangai and Madurai.
- Vaṭam manjuviraṭṭu: In this variant, the bull is tied with a 15 m (49 ft) rope (vatam means 'circle' in Tamil). There are no other physical restrictions for the bull and hence it can move freely anywhere. The maximum time period given is 30 minutes. A team of seven to nine members can attempt to untie the gift token that is tied on the bull's horn.

Bulls enter the competition area through a gate called the vadi vasal. Typically, participants must only hold onto the bull's hump. In some variations, they are disqualified if they hold onto the bull's neck, horns or tail. There may be several goals to the game depending on the region. In some versions, contestants must either hold the bull's hump for 30 seconds or for 15 metres (49 ft). If the contestant is thrown by the bull or falls, they lose. Some variations only allow for one contestant. If two people grab the hump, then neither person wins.

== Breeding ==
Bos indicus bulls are bred specifically by people of the village for the event. Bulls that are able to participate successfully in the jallikattu event are used as studs for breeding. These bulls also fetch higher prices in the markets.

== Training and preparation ==
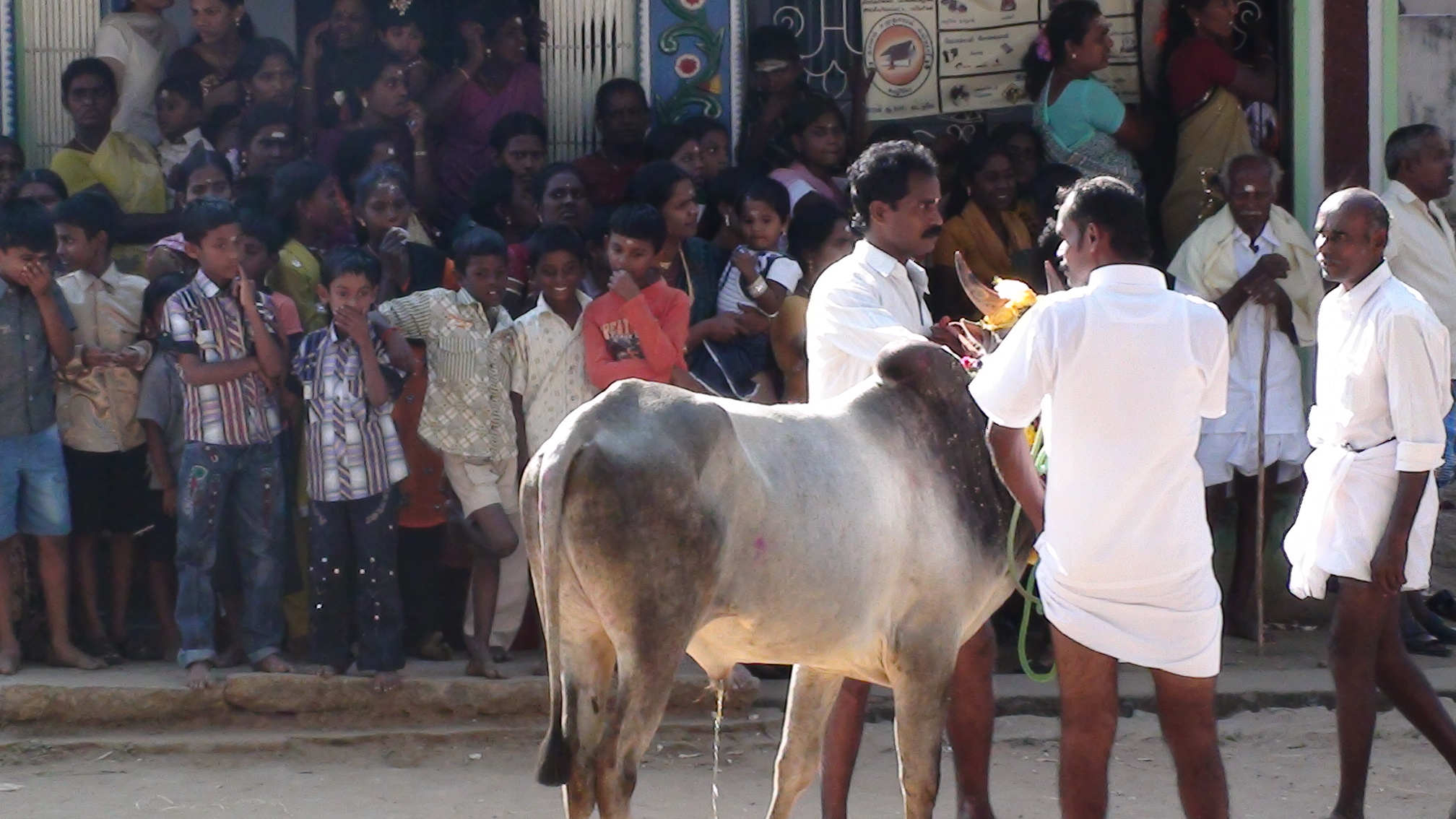
A bull being prepared for jallikattu

=== Training ===
Kabaddi was played as a warm up sport before the players enter the arena for Jallikattu.

=== Preparation ===
With the introduction of the Regulation of Jallikattu Act, 2009, by the Tamil Nadu legislature, the following activities were done in preparation of the event:

1. A written permission is obtained from the respective collector, thirty days prior to conduct of event along with notification of the event location.
2. The arena and the way through which the bulls pass through is double-barricaded, in order to avoid injuries to the spectators and by-standers who may be permitted to remain within the barricades.
3. The necessary gallery areas are built up along the double barricades.
4. The necessary permissions are obtained from the collector for the participants and the bulls fifteen days prior.
5. Final preparation before the event include a complete testing by the authorities of the Animal Husbandry Department, to ensure that performance enhancement drugs, liquor or other irritants are not used on the bulls.

== Animal rights concerns ==
Between 2008 and 2014, 43 humans and 4 bulls were killed in the jallikattu events. In 2017, there were 23 deaths in addition to about 2,500 human injuries and several instances of injury to the bulls. Year 2020 saw 5 deaths from participation in the event.

Animal rights and welfare concerns are related to the handling of the bulls before they are released and also during competitor's attempts to subdue the bull. Practices before the bull is released include prodding the bull with sharp sticks or scythes, extreme bending of the tail which can fracture the vertebrae, and biting of the bull's tail. There are also reports of the bulls being forced to drink alcohol to disorient them, or chilli peppers being rubbed in their eyes to aggravate the bull.

During attempts to subdue the bull, they are stabbed by various implements such as knives or sticks, punched, jumped on and dragged to the ground. In variants in which the bull is not enclosed, they may run into traffic or other dangerous places, sometimes resulting in broken bones or death. Protestors claim that jallikattu is promoted as bull taming, however, others suggest it exploits the bull's natural nervousness as prey animals by deliberately placing them in a terrifying situation in which they are forced to run away from the competitors which they perceive as predators and the practice effectively involves catching a terrified animal. Along with human injuries and fatalities, bulls themselves sometimes sustain injuries or die, which people may interpret as a bad omen for the village.

In his 2012 book Animal Rights Without Liberation, which analyses the use of animals in cultural practices and concerns about alleged hypocrisy, political theorist Alasdair Cochrane argues that culture cannot outweigh animal rights or outweigh animal interests in not being killed, even if this entails the destruction of cultures "defined entirely by the grave harm [they cause] to animals" and cites jallikattu as an example to argue that culture or human interests cannot outweigh animal interests in not suffering. An investigation by the Animal Welfare Board of India concluded that "jallikattu is inherently cruel to animals".

Animal welfare organisations such as the Federation of Indian Animal Protection Organisations (FIAPO) and PETA India have protested against the practice. The Indian Minister of Women and Child Development Maneka Gandhi denied the claim by jallikattu aficionados that the sport is only to demonstrate the "Tamil love for the bull", citing that the Tirukkural does not sanction cruelty to animals.

== Ban, protests and authorization ==
World laws on bullfighting: Nationwide ban on bullfighting / Nationwide ban on bullfighting, but some designated local traditions exempted; Some subnational bans on bullfighting / Bullfighting without killing bulls in the ring legal (Portuguese style or 'bloodless'); Bullfighting with killing bulls in the ring legal (Spanish style) / No data

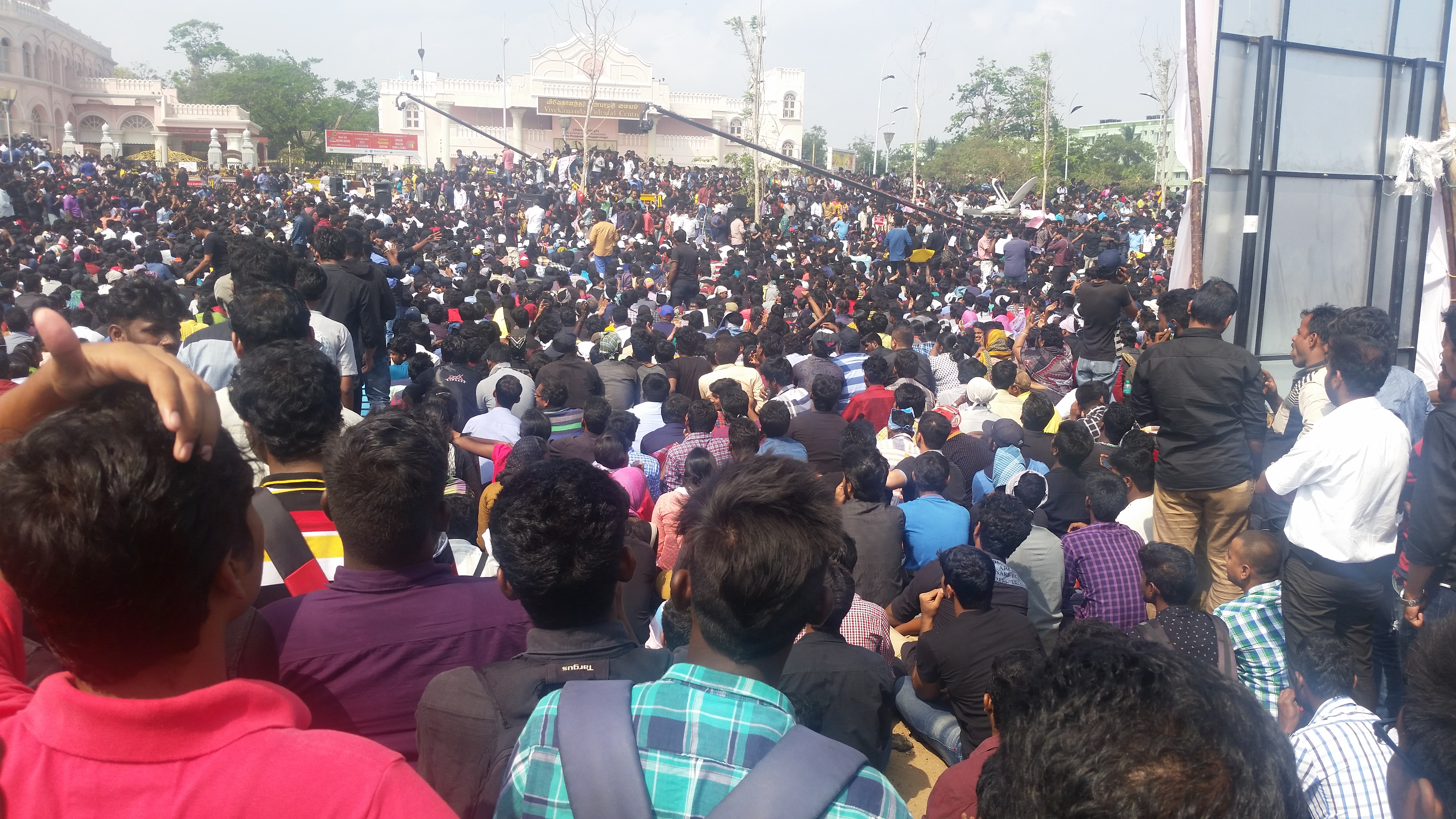
Anti-ban protesters at Marina beach, January 2017

The Animal Welfare Board of India filed a case in the Supreme Court of India for an outright ban on jallikattu because of the cruelty to animals and the threat to public safety involved.

On 27 November 2010, the Supreme Court permitted the Government of Tamil Nadu to allow jallikattu for five months in a year and directed the District Collectors to make sure that the animals that participate in jallikattu are registered to the Animal Welfare Board and in return the Board would send its representative to monitor the event. The Government of Tamil Nadu ordered that ₹2 lakh (US$2,100) be deposited by the organizers in case of an accident or injury during the event and enacted a rule to allow a team of veterinarians be present at the venue for certifying the bulls for participation in the event and to provide treatment for bulls that get injured.

The Ministry of Environment and Forests issued a notification in 2011 that banned the use of bulls as performing animals, thereby banning the event, but the practice continued to be held under Tamil Nadu Regulation of Jallikattu Act No 27 of 2009. On 7 May 2014, the Supreme Court of India struck down the State law and banned jallikattu altogether. The Supreme Court noted that any flouting of the ban should result in penalties for cruelty to animals under The Prevention of Cruelty to Animals Act, 1960. The court also asked the Government of India to amend the law on preventing cruelty to animals to bring bulls within its ambit. The Supreme Court also ruled that cruelty is inherent in these events, as bulls are not anatomically suited for such activities and making them participate is subjecting them to unnecessary pain and suffering, so such events were outlawed.

On 8 January 2016, the Ministry of Environment and Forests permitted the continuation of the tradition under certain conditions, effectively ending the ban. However, on 14 January 2016, the Supreme Court of India issued a stay on this order, upholding the ban, after a petition filed by the Animal Welfare Board of India and PETA India, leading to protests all over Tamil Nadu. The Supreme Court refused to review its decision on 26 July 2016.

On 16 January 2016, the World Youth Organization (WYO) protested at Chennai against the stay on the order overturning ban on conducting jallikattu in Tamil Nadu. The WYO also demanded a ban on PETA in India.

On 8 January 2017, several hundreds of protesters conducted a rally at the Marina in Chennai opposing the ban on jallikattu. The participants walked from the lighthouse to the labour statue bearing posters saying "save jallikattu". A few churches openly conducted prayer mass and rally against the Supreme Court ruling. Following the protests at Chennai, many students started rallies in various towns of Tamil Nadu.

After hearing the petitions which were led by the Animal Welfare Board of India challenging central government's notification, the Supreme Court of India on 12 January ordered a stay, issued notices to the central government and the Tamil Nadu government and later refused to lift the stay. Numerous jallikattu events were held across Tamil Nadu in protest of the ban, and hundreds of participants were detained by police in response. The Supreme Court has agreed to delay its verdict on jallikattu for a week following the centre's request that doing so would avoid unrest.

Due to these protests, on 21 January 2017, the governor of Tamil Nadu issued a new ordinance that authorized the continuation of jallikattu events. On 23 January 2017 the Tamil Nadu legislature passed a bipartisan bill, with the accession of the Prime Minister, exempting jallikattu from the Prevention of Cruelty to Animals Act (1960). The first legal jallikattu under this exemption took place on 1 February in Alanganallur, Madurai district.

The legal situation surrounding jallikattu is as yet not clearly resolved. Some, such as ex Ministry of External Affairs cabinet minister Salman Khurshid, have stated that the matter will only be truly resolved if the Prevention of Cruelty to Animals Act is amended as local ordinances and state laws cannot trump Indian federal law. According to The Hindu, many other Indian legal experts agreed with Khurshid's view, as federal laws such as the PCA are always more powerful than state laws, and in that respect the Prevention of Cruelty to Animals (Tamil Nadu Amendment) Act of 2017 is not much different from the state law overturned in 2009. For its part, PETA India has said that it will "study" the new ordinance, and has not ruled out a challenge to the new law on the same grounds as it challenged the 2009 law. On Jan 25, the Animal Welfare Board of India (AWBI) started the legal process towards another ban by formally challenging the new law before the Supreme Court, but they withdrew the petition on Jan 26. According to the AWBI's acting chairperson, AWBI does not plan to re-file the petition, but he claimed no knowledge of what other organizations, such as PETA, may do.

=== Timeline of the legal battle against the performance ===
- 29 March 2006: While hearing a petition filed by K. Muniasamy Thevar seeking permission to conduct a bullock cart race, the Madras High Court's Madurai Bench bans the sport of jallikattu.
- 10 January 2007: Jallikattu organisers file an appeal and the Single Bench Order is stayed by a Division Bench, paving the way to conduct the event again.
- 9 March 2007: The Division Bench sets aside Single Bench Order and gives suggestions to the State to introduce a regulatory mechanism.
- 27 July 2007: The Madras High Court's order is stayed by the Supreme Court after hearing an appeal by AWBI.
- 11 January 2008: The Supreme Court vacates stay, refusing to allow the sport.
- 15 January 2008: The Supreme Court allows a revision petition of the State, thereby permitting the event.
- 21 July 2009: The ruling DMK government passes the Tamil Nadu Regulation of Jallikattu Act, 2009.
- 8 April 2011: The Tamil Nadu Regulation of Jallikattu Act, 2009 is challenged by PETA before the Supreme Court.
- 11 July 2011: Ministry of Environment and Forests issues notification banning the use of bulls as performing animals.
- 7 May 2014: The Supreme Court bans jallikattu and strikes down the State law on the basis of a plea by the AWBI and PETA.
- 7 January 2016: Ministry of Environment and Forests modifies its earlier notification to permit the sport.
- 12 January 2016: The Supreme Court stays the centre's notification after hearing pleas by the AWBI and PETA.
- 16 November 2016: The State government's review petition seeking permission to conduct the event in 2017 is dismissed by the Supreme Court.
- 12 January 2017: The Supreme Court refuses to give a hurried judgement on a government notification to accommodate the sport in 2017.
- 21 January 2017: The Centre clears the ordinance proposed by the AIADMK government to bring a State amendment to the Prevention of Cruelty to Animals Act, 1960. The State had earlier urged the centre to consider the plea following massive protests.
- 23 January 2017: The State passes the Jallikattu Bill bringing into effect the Preventionof Cruelty to Animals (Tamil Nadu Amendment) Act, 2017, thereby allowing the conduct of jallikattu.
- 24 January 2017: The AWBI and PETA challenges the Tamil Nadu Amendment Act, 2017.
- 31 January 2017: The Supreme Court refuses to stay the Tamil Nadu Amendment Act, 2017.
- 6 November 2017: The Supreme Court seeks the State government's response to the plea filed by PETA questioning the Amendment Act.
- 2 February 2018: The Supreme Court refers all petitions filed against the sport to a Constitution Bench.
- 18 May 2023: A five judge Constitution Bench dismissed petitions challenging constitutionality of Jallikattu and upheld the validity Tamil Nadu laws protecting the sport,

== Jallikattu Premier League ==
The Jallikattu Premier League is a professional league in Tamil Nadu for jallikattu. The league was announced on 24 February 2018, to be organized in Chennai by the Tamil Nadu Jallikattu Peravai and the Chennai Jallikattu Amaippu.

== In popular culture ==
Jallikattu is often shown in Tamil cinema where the hero tames the bull to prove his gallantry. Some of the popular films are:

- Thaikkupin Tharam (1956)
- Vilaiyaattu Pillai (1970)
- Kanni Paruvathile (1979)
- Murattu Kaalai (1980)
- Mann Vasanai (1983)
- Cheran Pandian(1991)
- Rajakumaran (1994)
- Virumaandi (2004)
- Mirugam - The movie was released after cutting the jallikattu scene due to objections by the Censor Board (2007)
- Aravaan (2012)
- Ilami (2016)
- Meiyazhagan (2024)

== See also ==
- 2017 pro-jallikattu protests
- Kabaddi
- Bull-leaping
- Savika
