= Palamedu =

- panchayat town
- Location in Tamil Nadu, India
- Coordinates: 10.1043°N 78.1130°E
- Country: India
- State: Tamil Nadu
- District: Madurai
- Elevation: 244.51 m (802.2 ft)

Population (2011)
  - Total: 10,243

Languages
  - Official: Tamil
- Time zone: UTC+5:30 (IST)
- PIN: 625503
- Telephone code: 91-04543

Palamedu is a panchayat town in Madurai district in the Indian state of Tamil Nadu.

== Geography ==
Palamedu is located in Madurai near Alanganallur with the coordinates of (10.1043°N 78.1130°E). It has an average elevation of 244.51 m. (802.24 ft.).

== Demographics ==
As of 2001 India census, Palamedu had a population of 8187. Males constitute 50% of the population and females 50%. Palamedu has an average literacy rate of 62%, higher than the national average of 59.5%: male literacy is 69%, and female literacy is 54%. In Palamedu, 12% of the population is under 6 years of age.

== Politics ==
Palamedu comes under Sholavandan Assembly constituency. sholavandan assembly constituency is a part of Theni Lok Sabha constituency

== Economy ==
Palamedu has a moderate monsoon climate condition. People in this area are mainly cultivating 'Guava', 'Ground nut', 'Sugar Cane', 'Paddy (Rice)', etc. More people are engaged in producing dairy products. Milk is supplied to all over the southern parts of Tamil Nadu.
