= Sirumalai =

Mountain range in Tamil Nadu, India

- Last Hills of Eastern Ghats
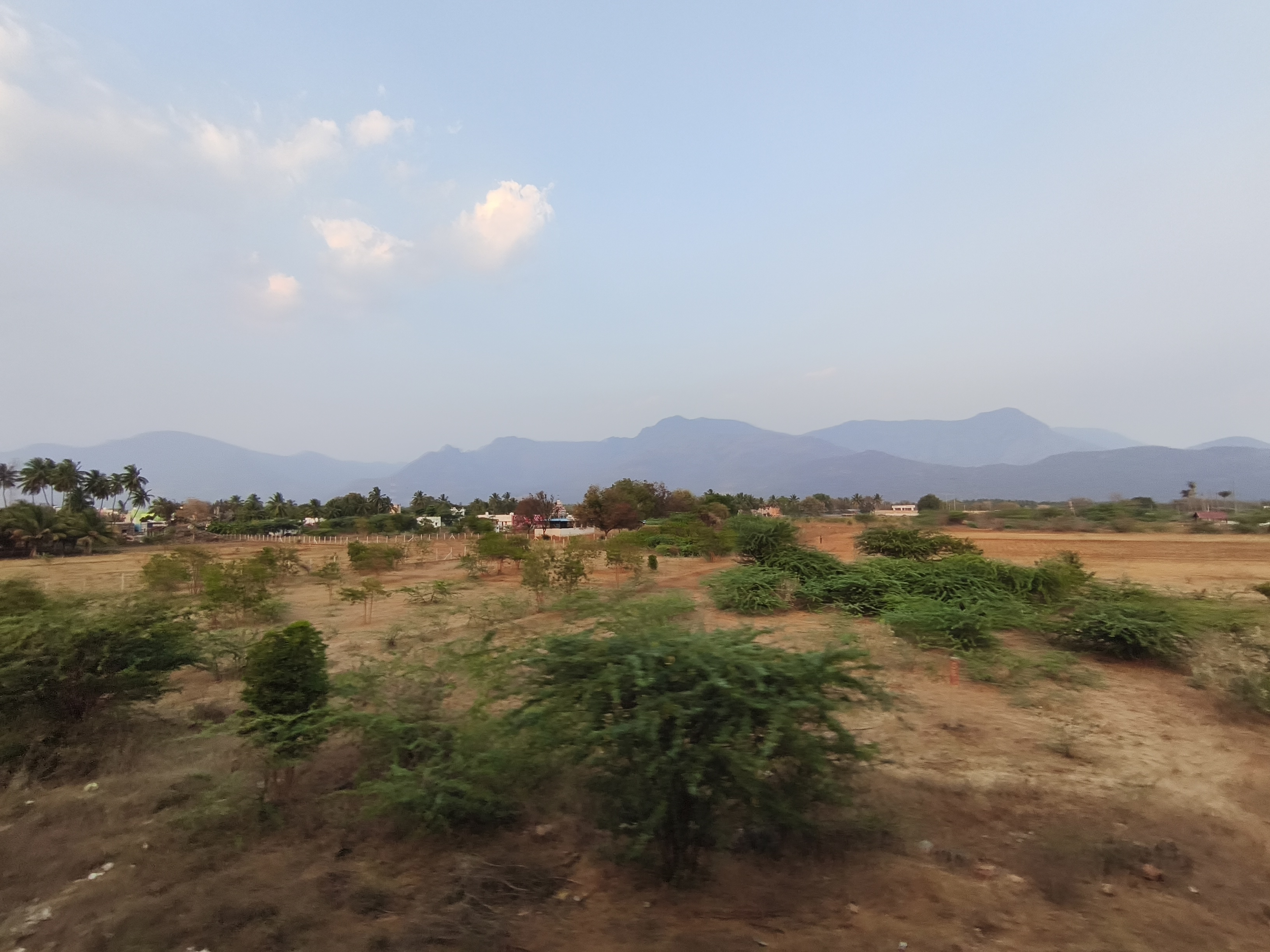
- Sirumalai Hills as seen fromm the WSW.

Highest point
- Elevation: 1,600 m (5,200 ft)
- Coordinates: 10°12′N 78°00′E

Naming
- Native name: சிறுமலை (Tamil)
- English translation: Sirumalai

Geography
- Location: Dindigul District, Tamil Nadu, India
- Parent range: Eastern Ghats

Geology
- Mountain type: Massif Hills

Sirumalai (Tamil: சிறுமலை) is a massif region of 60,000 acres (200 km^{2}) situated in Dindigul District, Tamil Nadu, India. Located 25 km (16 mi) from Dindigul, 90 km (56 mi) from Madurai, and 125 km from Trichy. There are many high hills in the area. Sirumalai range is the last mountain range of the Eastern Ghats. The last mountains of the Sirumalai mountain range are the Azhagar Kovil Hills which are present in Madurai District. Azhagar Kovil Hills are the most important place of worship for the Hindu religion. Trekking is allowed in the Azhagar Kovil Hills. The nearest Eastern Ghats hills to Sirumalai Hills are the Narthamalai Hills.

Sirumalai is a dense forest region with a moderate climate throughout the year. With an altitude of 1600 metres above sea level, it contains diversified flora and fauna. The hill has 18 hairpin bends. On the 18th bend are a church and a viewpoint of Dindigul city and the Dindigul Rock Fort. The hill contains a small waterfall as well. The famous Sirumalai Hill Banana is slowly disappearing from disease, which scientists have been unable to prevent. Meanwhile Khandige estates and eco projects private limited in sirumalai has managed to protect 1000 acres of native forest which is the last existing private forest recorded in sirumalai since 1990. www.khandigewildlife.org

Man-made fires on the hills have destroyed medicinal plants and threatened the fauna habitat. Fires are often set to promote vegetation growth used for animal fodder, clear land for cultivation, or improve access to timber.

== Attractions ==
Sirumalai Lake contains a small lake that was artificially created in the year 2010. The hills also has many water falls named Kutladampatti water falls, vellimalai water falls, sirumalai water falls, vowvaal kidangu waterfalls, konkatti odai waterfalls, thalliparai waterfalls, and there is also several dams located within the hill range which are Sathaiyar Dam, Mavoor Dam. The waterfalls is not allowed for tourist. There are also many view points, some trecking and adventure spots available at sirumalai hill areas.

In the region of Sirumalai, the Agasthiarpuram is a holy place where siddhas (monks) have lived since ancient times. The area is surrounded with medicinal herbs and plants. At the top of the hill is the historic Shiva Lingam, which dates back at least 500 years.

The famous Lord Murugan temple (Vellimalai Sivan Temple) is located in the mountain which is away from 45 minutes climbing over the valley.

== Flora and fauna ==
Much of the Sirumalai is covered by deciduous forests – the lower slopes by dry deciduous and the higher slopes and riverine valleys by moist and wet deciduous forests. This area is famous for a banana species (malai vazhai). Trees such as terminalia, shorea, and magnolia champaca are dominant in these hills. Other rare plants such as lianas and orchids also occur in the higher elevation evergreen tracts. Coffee estates form a major portion of the present-day landscape. These reserve forests are protected under the Tamil Nadu Forest Department.

A rich animal life including threatened animals such as the slender loris, gaur, sambar deer, sloth bear, Asian palm civet, Indian hare, jungle cat and Indian pangolin are to be seen in the wild. Birds such as Indian peafowl, Asian koel, Indian grey hornbill and even the endemic blue-winged parakeet are found in these forests. Threatened reptiles such as the python molurus, Indian star tortoise, and venomous snakes such as Indian cobra, Russell's viper, common krait and the endemic bamboo pit viper and the little-known striped coral snake are found here. Lizards such as the Bengal monitor, the Indian chameleon, the flying lizard, common green forest lizard, lesser snake-eyed lacerta and Cnemaspis geckoes are to be seen here. Special mention must be made of the only endemic reptile of the hill – the Sirumalai shieldtail snake Uropeltis dindigalensis, that is reportedly not found anywhere else. Rare and endemic amphibians such as golden-backed frogs, Indian frogs, short-webbed frog and the direct-developing bush frog Pseudophilautus wynaadensis occur here. A myriad forms of lesser-known insects and moths, etc. are present.

== Agathya Puram ==
Located in Sirumalai is Agathya Puram, named after the prominent Agathya Siddhar. Located in Agathya Puram is Silver Hill; this is the tallest hill in Sirumalai. It is said that the peak of the hill was made up of silver but to avoid man's destructive actions during the Kali Yuga, the hill was transformed via alchemy into stone by Agathya Siddhar, hence the name silver hill. The hill's silver glitter can be still seen in the sunlight. In the peak of this silver hill is a 500-year-old Shiva Lingam; the walk to top of the hill is about 30–45 minutes. The view from the silver hill is breathtaking.

== Agatthiyar SivaSakthi Sitthar Peedam ==
Agatthiyar SivaSakthi Sitthar Peedam is an ashram located at the silver hill in Agathya Puram. Food is served daily (Annadanam) and lodging is available at the ashram. The ashram aims to promote various voluntary campaigns such as cleaning of the hills.

== Gallery ==
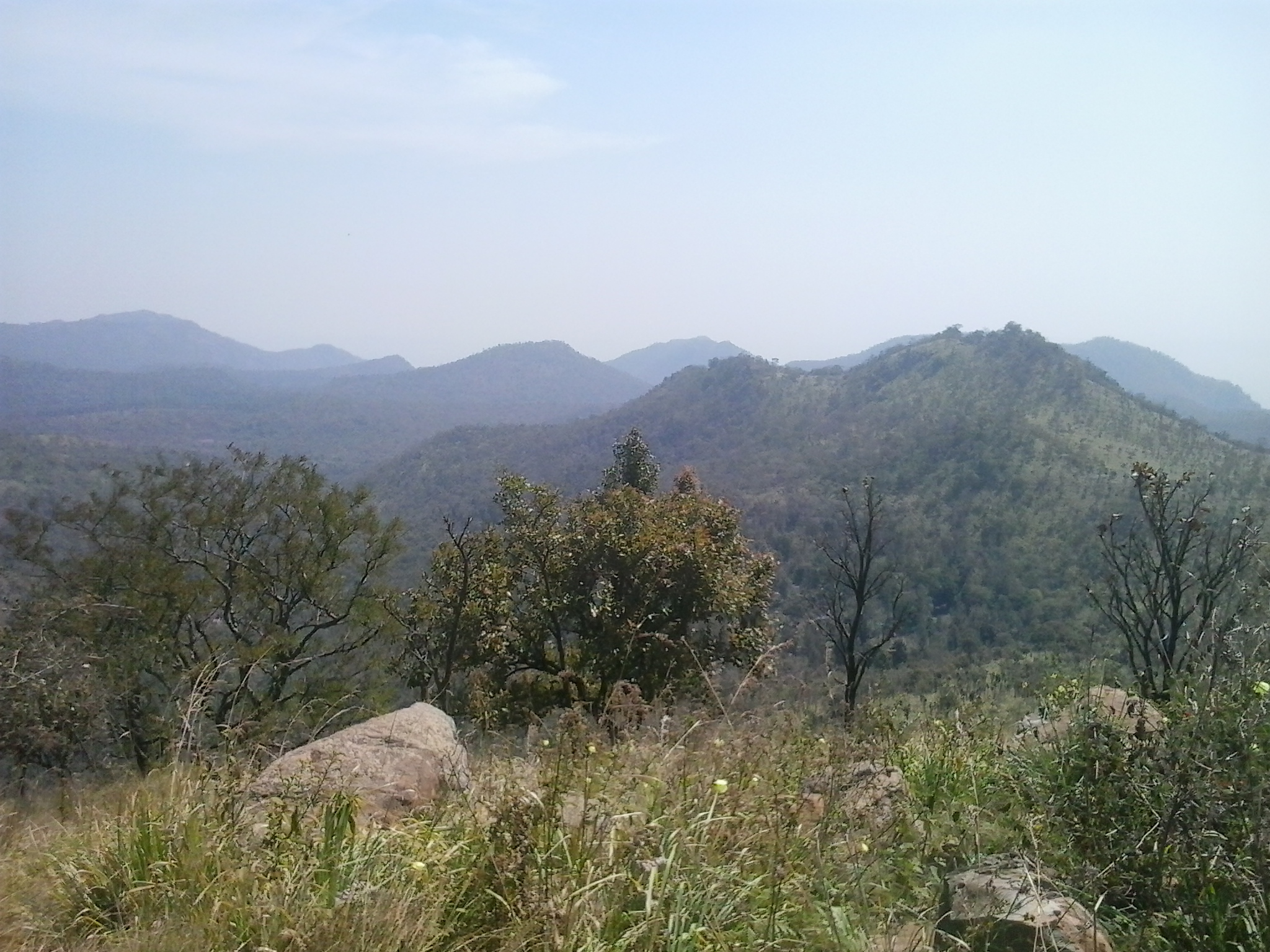
Mountains of Sirumalai Hills

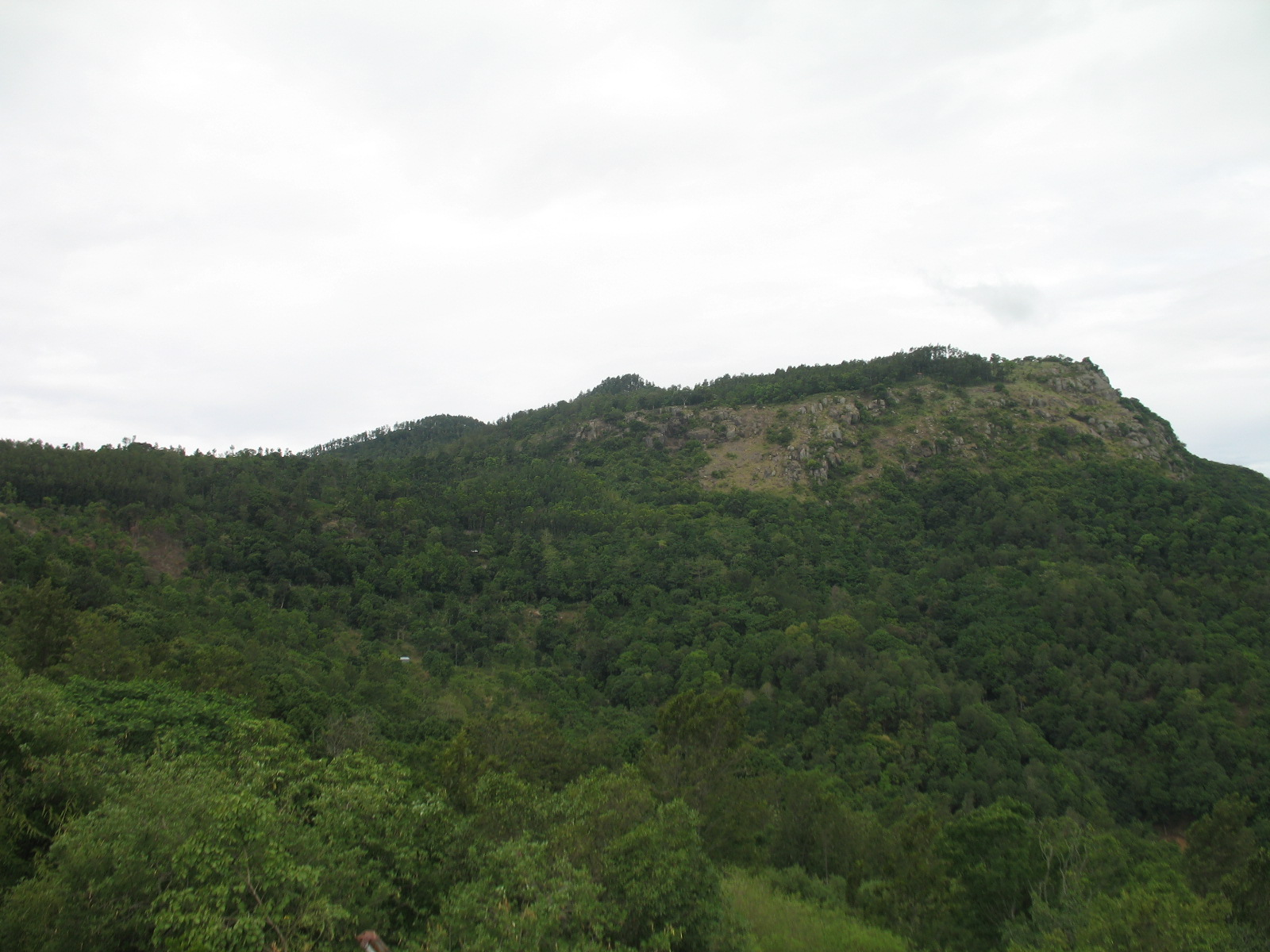
A view of Sirumalai from the viewpoint

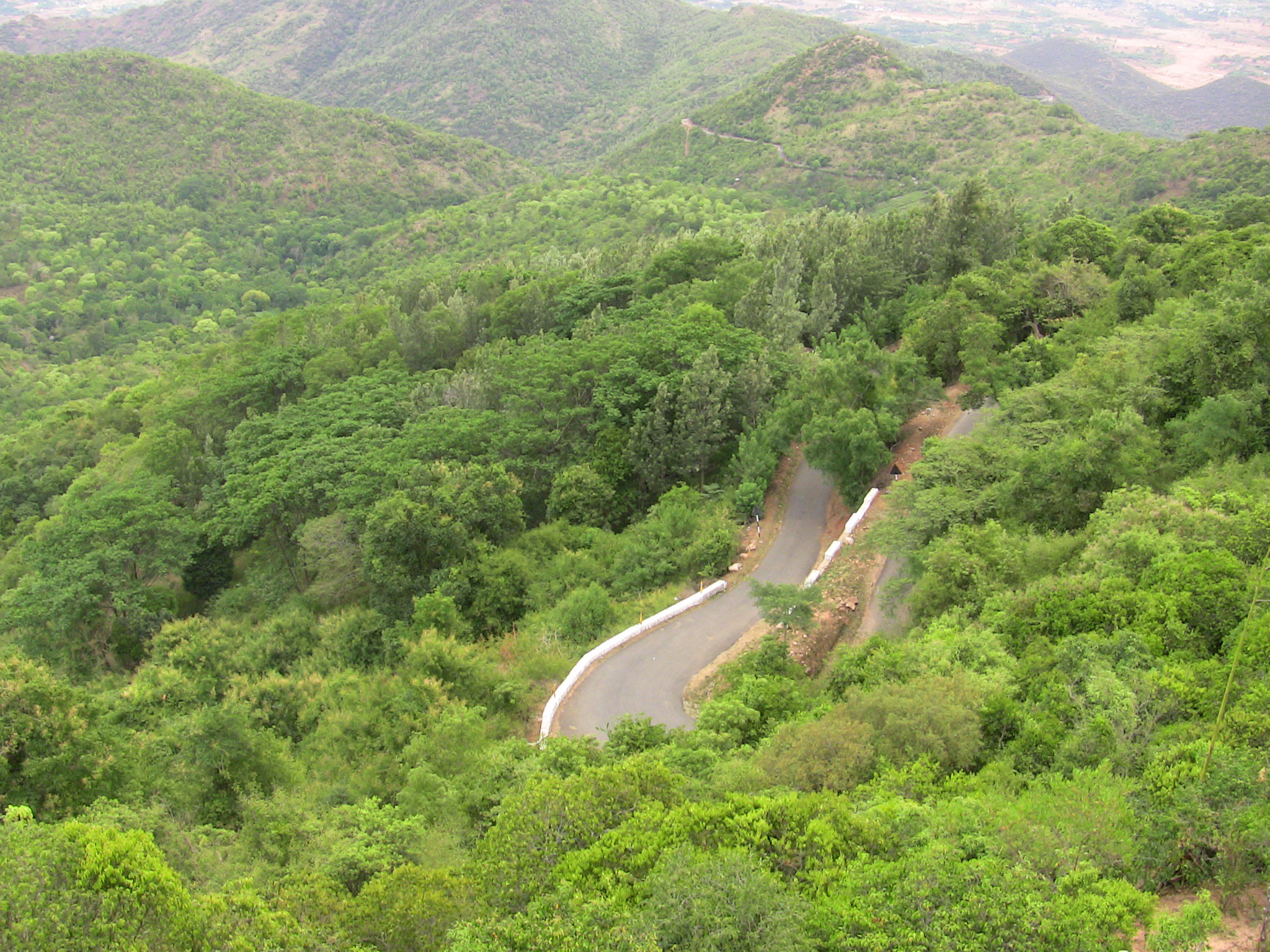
Road view from Sirumalai View Point
