= Ettakkapatti =

Village in Tamil Nadu, India

Coordinates: 9°23′N 77°45′E

Ettakkapatti is a small village in Virudhunagar District in the Indian state of Tamil Nadu. Ettakkapatti is located 13 km from Sivakasi, surrounded by villages Madathupatti, Reddyapatti, Edirkottai and Lakshmiyapuram.

Most of the Native population here are farmers and fireworks workers and speak both Telugu and Tamil.
