= Badrakali Amman temple, Sivakasi =

Badrakali Amman Temple
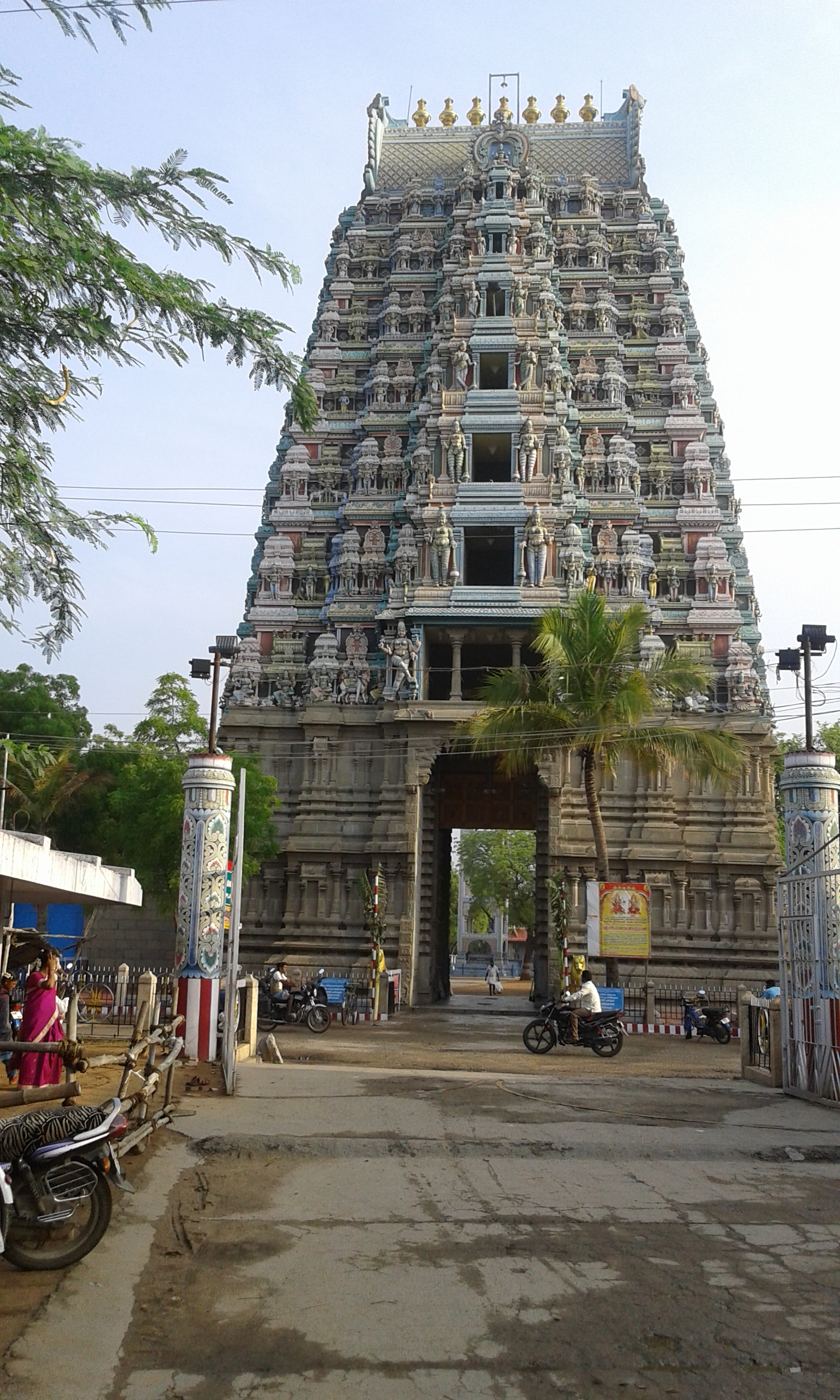

- Location in Tamil Nadu

Religion
- Affiliation: Hinduism
- District: Virudhunagar
- Deity: Badrakali Amman

Location
- Location: Sivakasi
- State: Tamil Nadu
- Country: India
- Interactive map of Badrakali Amman Temple
- Coordinates: 9°27′23″N 77°47′52″E

Architecture
- Type: Dravidian architecture

Badrakali Amman Temple in Sivakasi, a town in Virudhunagar district in the South Indian state of Tamil Nadu, is dedicated to the Hindu god Badrakali. Constructed in the Dravidian style of architecture, the temple is believed to have been built during the 18th century with later expansion during the 19th and 20th centuries.

The temple has a five-tiered gopuram, the gateway tower and a granite wall surrounds the temple, enclosing all its shrines. The temple is open from 6am - 12 pm and 5 - 8:30 pm on all days except during new moon days when it is open the full day. Four daily rituals and many yearly festivals are held at the temple, of which Panguni Pongal and Chithirai Pongal festivals being the most prominent.

== Architecture ==
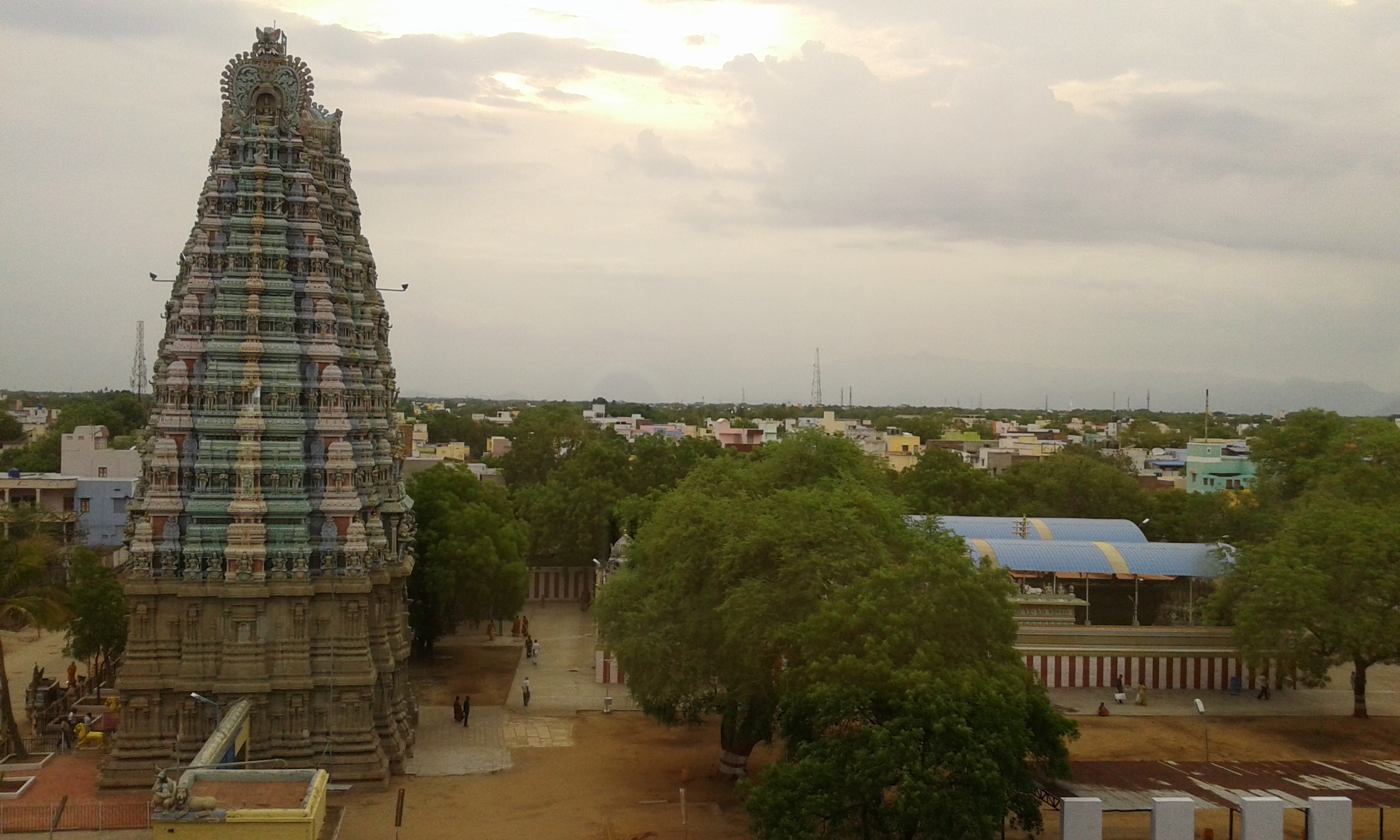
Pillared hall leading to the main entrance

Badrakali is a fierce manifestation of Parvati, the consort of Shiva. Badrakali Amman temple is the most prominent landmark of Sivakasi. The tower or Rajagopuram of this temple has a breadth of 66 ft (20 m), width of 44 ft (13 m) and a height of 110 ft (34 m). Unlike other temples, the gopuram is not in axial direction towards the sanctum. The presiding deity, Badrakali Amman, is housed in a north facing sanctum to the left of the gateway tower in a seated posture. The vimana of the shrine is plated with gold. There is a large temple tank and a bell tower located axial to the sanctum. There is an shrine of Heramba Vinayaka, a fierce manifestation of Vinayaka with five heads. Usually the manifestation is sported with lion as his vehicle obtained from his mother Parvathi. In this temple, he is sported with his bandicoot vehicle. There are shrines of eight forms of lakshmi in a shrine around the sanctum. There are smaller shrines of other deities like Ayyappa, Murugan and Agora Murthy located adjacent to the temple tank.

== History ==
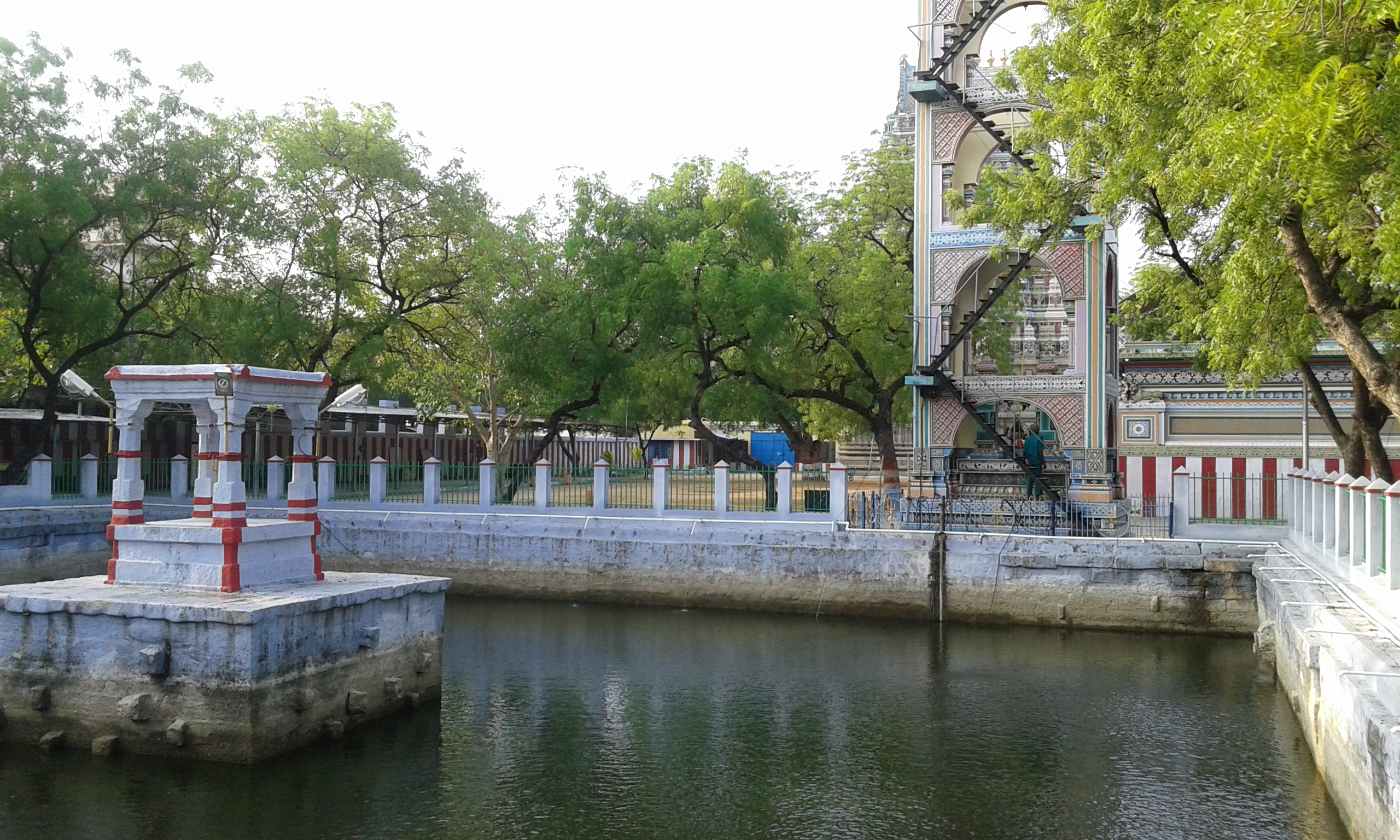
Temple tank in the temple

During the 1800s, Nadars, then aspiring business community, established their commercial base in the town. By the end of the 19th century, the Nadars’ rapid rise as a business community lead to confrontation with the Maravars. The Nadars were holding the ownership of the Badrakali temple and other smaller shrines in the north of the town. The Nadars were denied entry to the Kasi Viswanathar temple and when they tried to enter in 1899, it led to a series of riots which became known as the Sivakasi riots. The Badrakali temple was closed for a number of days during the riots and the festivals were cancelled. A total of 22 people were killed, as many as 800 houses and Big chariot in center of the city used by temple during festival were burnt during the riots. Eventually the riots came to an end after the intervention of the military in mid-July 1899.

== Festival ==
The temple priests perform the pooja (rituals) during festivals and on a daily basis. There are weekly, monthly and fortnightly rituals performed in the temple. The temple is open from 6 am to 12 pm and from 5 pm to 8:30 pm on all days except during new moon days when it is open for the whole day. Panguni Pongal and Chithirai Pongal are the annual festivals celebrated for the deities Mariamman and Badrakali Amman in April and May respectively, both of which are celebrated for ten days.
