= Edirkottai =

Village in Tamil Nadu, India

Coordinates: 9°23′N 77°44′E

Edirkottai is a small village in Vembakottai taluk of Tamil Nadu, India. It is located 15 km from Sivakasi and 22 km from Sattur.

== Politics ==
Village is a part of Sattur (state assembly constituency) and elects one MLA to the Tamil Nadu Legislative Assembly. Raghuraman A. R. R. from Dravida Munnetra Kazhagam party is the MLA of Sattur since 2021.

From 2009, Sattur (state assembly constituency) is part of Virudhunagar (Lok Sabha constituency); formerly it was known as the Sivakasi (Lok Sabha constituency). Manickam Tagore is the MP from Virudhunagar since 2019.

== Facility ==
It has a bus stop and a primary school. It has a 24-hour panchayat located on the main road. In May or June it has kovil pongal.
