= Sanjay Ramasamy =

Indian politician

Tamil Nadu Legislative Assembly
- In office 1991–1996
- Preceded by: R. Chokkar
- Succeeded by: A. R. R. Seenivasan
- Constituency: Virudhunagar

Personal details
- Party: Indian National Congress; AIADMK
- Relations: Sridevi (sister-in-law)

Sanjay Ramasamy is an Indian politician and former Member of the Legislative Assembly. He was elected to the Tamil Nadu legislative assembly as an Indian Congress (Socialist) – Sarat Chandra Sinha candidate from Virudhunagar constituency in 1991 election. And stood from virudhunagar as the AIADMK LS candidate in 1999. He is the son of Justice V. Ramaswami, the former Supreme Court Judge and Chief Justice of Punjab and haryana High Court, who was the first to be put up for removal from the bench but later sent to Chhattisgarh as the chief justice.

He married Srilatha Yanger, sister of actress Sridevi.

He is the President of the Cosmopolitan Club, Chennai
