= K. T. Rajenthra Bhalaji =

Former Member of the Tamil Nadu Legislative Assembly

Minister for Milk and Dairy Development
- In office 29 August 2016 – 2 May 2021
- Chief Minister: J.Jayalalithaa; O. Panneerselvam; Edappadi K. Palaniswami
- Preceded by: S. P. Shunmuganathan
- Succeeded by: S. M. Nasar

Minister for Rural Industries
- In office 23 May 2016 – 28 August 2016
- Chief Minister: J.Jayalalithaa
- Preceded by: P. Mohan
- Succeeded by: P. Benjamin

Minister for Information and Special Programme implementation
- In office 6 November 2011 – 22 May 2016
- Chief Minister: J. Jayalalithaa; O. Panneerselvam; J. Jayalalithaa
- Preceded by: M. C. Sampath
- Succeeded by: S. P. Velumani

Member of the Tamil Nadu Legislative Assembly
- In office 16 May 2011 – 2 May 2021
- Preceded by: R. Gnanadoss
- Succeeded by: A. M. S. G. Ashokan
- Constituency: Sivakasi

Personal details
- Party: All India Anna Dravida Munnetra Kazhagam

K. T. Rajenthra Bhalaji is a former minister and former member of Tamil Nadu Legislative Assembly elected from the Sivakasi constituency in 2011 and 2016. He represented the All India Anna Dravida Munnetra Kazhagam party.

Bhalaji was first appointed Minister for Information and Special Programme Implementation by Jayalalithaa in a cabinet reshuffle of November 2011. He served as the Minister for Information and Special Programme implementation of Tamil Nadu (during November 2011 - May 2016) and as the Minister for Rural Industries of Tamil Nadu (from May 2016 - August 2016) and after reshuffle of portfolios in August 2016, he became the Minister for Milk and Dairy Development of Tamil Nadu (during August 2016 - May 2021).

Bhalaji initiated a new scheme in “Aavin – Tamilnadu Co-operative Milk Producers Federation Limited” that milk would be available to the public 24 hrs in Chennai City and the same has been implemented throughout Tamil Nadu. This scheme has been appreciated by the public in a great manner.

In 2021, he contested Rajapalayam Legislative constituency and lost to the DMK candidate Thangapandiyan.

== Controversies ==
On 25 September 2019, Balaji has fueled a controversy after calling Congress MP Manickam Tagore as an 'ungrateful dog' and asked people to beat him with slippers when he comes seeking vote in Nanguneri. In another scathing remark he further called him a pig and asked people to shoot Manickam Tagore with rubber bullets if he ever went there.

Bhalaji on 13 May 2019 created controversy when he said actor-politician Kamal Haasan's tongue should be chopped off for saying that Nathuram Godse was a Hindu extremist. He also said Kamal Hassan's party Makkal Needhi Maiam should be banned and the Election Commission should take action. Makkal Needhi Maiam general secretary A Arunachalam said Bhalaji should be removed from his post as he lacks political ethics and personal dignity.

On 9 March 2019, he claimed prime minister Narendra Modi as the father of his party AIADMK on the demise of late J. Jayalalithaa who he and his party members called their mother.

On 23 March 2020, K. T. Rajenthra Bhalaji was removed from his post as the AIADMK district secretary in Virudhunagar. The decision came hours after he made a controversial statement linking COVID-19 with religion.

Sattur AIADMK MLA Rajavarman accused Balaji of threatening to kill him for 6 months with mercenaries. He claimed that Balaji threatened to cut and stab him. He said this during a meeting on 18 October 2020.

== Elections contested ==
=== Tamil Nadu Legislative elections ===
| Elections | Constituency | Party | Result | Vote percentage | Opposition Candidate | Opposition Party | Opposition vote percentage |
|---|---|---|---|---|---|---|---|
| 2011 Tamil Nadu Legislative Assembly election | Sivakasi | AIADMK | Won | 59.17 | T. Vanaraja | DMK | 35.01 |
| 2016 Tamil Nadu Legislative Assembly election | Sivakasi | AIADMK | Won | 43.67 | C. Sreeraja | INC | 35.28 |
| 2021 Tamil Nadu Legislative Assembly election | Rajapalayam | AIADMK | Lost | 39.73 | S. Thangappandian | DMK | 41.94 |
