= T. Radhakrishnan =

Indian politician (1955–2022)

Member of Parliament, Lok Sabha
- In office 16 May 2014 – 23 May 2019
- Preceded by: Manicka Tagore, INC
- Succeeded by: Manicka Tagore, INC
- Constituency: Virudhunagar

Personal details
- Born: 2 June 1955 Vadapatti, Virudhunagar, Madras State, India
- Died: 11 December 2022 (aged 67) Sivakasi, Tamil Nadu, India
- Party: All India Anna Dravida Munnetra Kazhagam
- Spouse: Smt.Jayalakshmi
- Children: 3
- Occupation: Agriculturist
- As of 17 December, 2016

T. Radhakrishnan (2 June 1955 – 11 December 2022) was an Indian politician and Member of Parliament elected from Tamil Nadu. He was elected to the Lok Sabha from Virudhunagar constituency as an Anna Dravida Munnetra Kazhagam candidate in 2014 election.

Radhakrishnan was a Virudhunagar district secretary and three-time chairman of Sivakasi panchayat union. His party did not give seat to him.to contest 2019 Indian general election. It gave the seat to alliance party DMDK's R. Alagarsamy to contest the election but he lost to Manicka Tagore of the INC.

Radhakrishnan died on 11 December 2022, at the age of 67.
