= A. M. S. G. Ashokan =

Indian politician

Member of the Tamil Nadu Legislative Assembly
- In office 2 May 2021 – 4 May 2026
- Preceded by: K. T. Rajenthra Bhalaji
- Succeeded by: S. Keerthana
- Constituency: Sivakasi

Personal details
- Party: Indian National Congress
- Occupation: Indian politician

A. M. S. G. Ashokan is an Indian politician and member of the Tamil Nadu Legislative Assembly representing Sivakasi. He is a member of the Indian National Congress.

== Personal life ==
Ashokan is a commerce graduate and has been a Congress party member since 1996. He served as the vice chairman of the Sivakasi municipality between 2006 and 2011. His father A. M. S. Ganesan also served as the chairperson of the Sivakasi municipality between 1967 and 1974 and his elder brother was the Tamil Nadu state president of the Seva Dal. He is also the managing director of the Arasan Ganesan Group of Industries.

== Electoral performance ==
2021 Tamil Nadu Legislative Assembly election: Sivakasi
Party	Candidate	Votes	%	±%
INC	A. M. S. G. Ashokan	78,947	43.07	+7.79
AIADMK	Lakshmi Ganesan	61,628	33.62	−10.06
NTK	R. Kanagapriya	20,865	11.38	+9.53
AMMK	G. Samikkalai	9,893	5.40	New
MNM	S. Mugunthan	6,090	3.32	New
NOTA	NOTA	1,727	0.94	−0.6
Independent	E. Lakshmanan	1,430	0.78	New
Margin of victory		17,319	9.45	1.05
Turnout		183,320	70.02	−3.87
Rejected ballots		61	0.03	
Registered electors		261,809		
INC gain from AIADMK		Swing	-0.61	
