= V. Balakrishnan (politician) =

Indian politician (1939–2020)

Member of the Tamil Nadu Legislative Assembly for Sivakasi constituency

Personal details
- Born: 21 December 1943
- Died: 8 August 2020 (aged 80)
- Resting place: Sivakasi
- Party: Anna Dravida Munnetra Kazhagam

V. Balakrishnan (31 December 1939 – 8 August 2020) was an Indian politician and Member of the Legislative Assembly. He was elected to the Tamil Nadu legislative assembly as an Anna Dravida Munnetra Kazhagam candidate from Sivakasi constituency in 1980 and 1984 elections.
