= Virudhunagar Assembly constituency =

One of the 234 State Legislative Assembly Constituencies in Tamil Nadu, in India

Coordinates: 9°35′N 77°57′E

Virudhunagar
- Constituency No. 206 for the Tamil Nadu Legislative Assembly

Constituency details
- Country: India
- Region: South India
- State: Tamil Nadu
- District: Virudhunagar
- Lok Sabha constituency: Virudhunagar
- Established: 1951
- Total electors: 200,618

Member of Legislative Assembly
- 17th Tamil Nadu Legislative Assembly
- Incumbent P. Selvam
- Party: TVK
- Elected year: 2026

Virudhunagar is a legislative assembly constituency in the Indian state of Tamil Nadu. Elections were not held in year 1957 and 1962. Former Chief Minister of Tamil Nadu, K. Kamaraj, lost to P. Seenivasan in 1967 from Virudhunagar. It is a part of Virudhunagar Lok Sabha constituency. It is one of the 234 State Legislative Assembly Constituencies in Tamil Nadu, in India.

== Members of Legislative Assembly ==
=== Madras State ===
| Year | Winner | Party |
|---|---|---|
| 1952 | V. V. Ramasami | Independent |
| 1967 | P. Seenivasan | Dravida Munnetra Kazhagam |

=== Tamil Nadu ===
| Year | Winner | Party |
|---|---|---|
| 1971 | P. Seenivasan | Dravida Munnetra Kazhagam |
| 1977 | M. Sundararajan | All India Anna Dravida Munnetra Kazhagam |
| 1980 | M. Sundararajan | All India Anna Dravida Munnetra Kazhagam |
| 1984 | A. S. A. Arumugam | Janata Party |
| 1989 | R. Chokkar | Indian National Congress |
| 1991 | Sanjay Ramasamy | Indian Congress (Socialist) – Sarat Chandra Sinha |
| 1996 | A. R. R. Seenivasan | Dravida Munnetra Kazhagam |
| 2001 | S. Dhamodharan | Tamil Maanila Congress |
| 2006 | R. Varadarajan | Marumalarchi Dravida Munnetra Kazhagam |
| 2011 | K. Pandiarajan | Desiya Murpokku Dravida Kazhagam |
| 2016 | A. R. R. Seenivasan | Dravida Munnetra Kazhagam |
| 2021 | A. R. R. Seenivasan | Dravida Munnetra Kazhagam |
| 2026 | P. Selvam | Tamilaga Vettri Kazhagam |

== Election results ==
Vote share of winning candidates
| 2026 | 39.06% |
| 2021 | 45.32% |
| 2016 | 42.71% |
| 2011 | 52.36% |
| 2006 | 38.85% |
| 2001 | 42.67% |
| 1996 | 41.53% |
| 1991 | 56.07% |
| 1989 | 32.00% |
| 1984 | 45.36% |
| 1980 | 48.86% |
| 1977 | 44.52% |
| 1971 | 49.88% |
| 1967 | 49.90% |
| 1952 | 46.67% |

=== 2026 ===
2026 Tamil Nadu Legislative Assembly election: Virudhunagar
| Party | Candidate | Votes | % | ±% |
|---|---|---|---|---|
| TVK | P. Selvam | 63,653 | 39.06 | New |
| DMDK | Vijay Prabhakaran | 54,110 | 33.19 | |
| AIADMK | V. G. Ganesan | 34,212 | 20.99 | |
| NTK | Lakshmanan | 10,120 | 6.21 | ▼2.73 |
| NOTA | None of the above | 954 | 0.59 | |
| Margin of victory | | 9,391 | 5.76 | |
| Turnout | | 163,049 | 82.10 | |
| Rejected ballots | | | | |
| Registered electors | | 198,616 | | |
| TVK gain from DMK | | Swing | | |

=== 2021 ===
2021 Tamil Nadu Legislative Assembly election: Virudhunagar
| Party | Candidate | Votes | % | ±% |
|---|---|---|---|---|
| DMK | A. R. R. Seenivasan | 73,297 | 45.77% | +3.06 |
| BJP | G. Pandurangan | 51,958 | 32.44% | +27.87 |
| NTK | V. R. Selvakumar | 14,311 | 8.94% | +7.33 |
| AMMK | M. Thangaraj | 10,783 | 6.73% | New |
| SMK | N. Manimaran | 5,054 | 3.16% | New |
| NOTA | NOTA | 1,570 | 0.98% | −0.87 |
| Independent | G. Gunasekaran | 1,406 | 0.88% | New |
| Margin of victory | | 21,339 | 13.32% | 11.45% |
| Turnout | | 160,147 | 71.46% | −2.15% |
| Rejected ballots | | 60 | 0.04% | |
| Registered electors | | 224,099 | | |
| DMK hold | | Swing | 3.06% | |

=== 2016 ===
2016 Tamil Nadu Legislative Assembly election: Virudhunagar
| Party | Candidate | Votes | % | ±% |
|---|---|---|---|---|
| DMK | A. R. R. Seenivasan | 65,499 | 42.71% | New |
| AIADMK | K. Kalanithi | 62,629 | 40.84% | New |
| DMDK | M. Syed Kaja Shareef | 10,127 | 6.60% | −45.75 |
| BJP | S. Kamatchi | 7,013 | 4.57% | +2.24 |
| NOTA | NOTA | 2,835 | 1.85% | New |
| NTK | D. Akilan | 2,461 | 1.60% | New |
| Margin of victory | | 2,870 | 1.87% | −14.06% |
| Turnout | | 153,347 | 73.62% | −5.40% |
| Registered electors | | 208,304 | | |
| DMK gain from DMDK | | Swing | -9.65% | |

=== 2011 ===
2011 Tamil Nadu Legislative Assembly election: Virudhunagar
| Party | Candidate | Votes | % | ±% |
|---|---|---|---|---|
| DMDK | K. Pandiarajan | 70,441 | 52.36% | +40.41 |
| INC | T. Armstrong Naveen | 49,003 | 36.42% | +0.73 |
| Independent | S. Karkuvel Mariselvam | 5,652 | 4.20% | New |
| BJP | S. Kamatchi | 3,139 | 2.33% | −0.16 |
| Independent | K. V. Murugesan | 1,571 | 1.17% | New |
| Independent | S. Veera Perumal | 1,093 | 0.81% | New |
| BSP | M. Perumalsamy | 715 | 0.53% | −4.26 |
| Margin of victory | | 21,438 | 15.93% | 12.78% |
| Turnout | | 134,537 | 79.01% | 7.59% |
| Registered electors | | 170,268 | | |
| DMDK gain from MDMK | | Swing | 13.51% | |

=== 2006 ===
2006 Tamil Nadu Legislative Assembly election: Virudhunagar
| Party | Candidate | Votes | % | ±% |
|---|---|---|---|---|
| MDMK | R. Varadarajan | 50,629 | 38.85% | +26.16 |
| INC | S. Dhamodharan | 46,522 | 35.69% | New |
| DMDK | A. Subburaj | 15,575 | 11.95% | New |
| BSP | A. Selva Kumaresan | 6,241 | 4.79% | New |
| AIFB | A. Selvam | 5,475 | 4.20% | New |
| BJP | M. Eswaran | 3,255 | 2.50% | New |
| Independent | P. Ramar | 1,294 | 0.99% | New |
| Margin of victory | | 4,107 | 3.15% | −0.32% |
| Turnout | | 130,333 | 71.43% | 11.25% |
| Registered electors | | 182,473 | | |
| MDMK gain from TMC(M) | | Swing | -3.82% | |

=== 2001 ===
2001 Tamil Nadu Legislative Assembly election: Virudhunagar
| Party | Candidate | Votes | % | ±% |
|---|---|---|---|---|
| TMC(M) | S. Dhamodharan | 49,413 | 42.67% | New |
| DMK | A. R. R. Seenivasan | 45,396 | 39.20% | −2.33 |
| MDMK | R. Varatharajan | 14,695 | 12.69% | −4.54 |
| Independent | M. Rajailango | 2,595 | 2.24% | New |
| JD(S) | A. S. A. Arumugam | 1,090 | 0.94% | New |
| Independent | P. S. A Umar Farook | 1,040 | 0.90% | New |
| Independent | M. G. Raja | 620 | 0.54% | New |
| Margin of victory | | 4,017 | 3.47% | −17.18% |
| Turnout | | 115,815 | 60.18% | −6.86% |
| Registered electors | | 192,478 | | |
| TMC(M) gain from DMK | | Swing | 1.14% | |

=== 1996 ===
1996 Tamil Nadu Legislative Assembly election: Virudhunagar
| Party | Candidate | Votes | % | ±% |
|---|---|---|---|---|
| DMK | A. R. R. Seenivasan | 47,247 | 41.53% | New |
| INC | G. Karikolraj | 23,760 | 20.88% | New |
| MDMK | B. Boopathirajaram | 19,600 | 17.23% | New |
| PMK | S. Velayutham | 9,001 | 7.91% | New |
| BJP | S. Manoharan | 5,195 | 4.57% | New |
| Independent | S. Bose Perumal | 2,548 | 2.24% | New |
| Independent | S. Baluchamy | 1,989 | 1.75% | New |
| Margin of victory | | 23,487 | 20.64% | 0.20% |
| Turnout | | 113,773 | 67.04% | 6.05% |
| Registered electors | | 179,060 | | |
| DMK gain from INS(SCS) | | Swing | -14.54% | |

=== 1991 ===
1991 Tamil Nadu Legislative Assembly election: Virudhunagar
| Party | Candidate | Votes | % | ±% |
|---|---|---|---|---|
| INS(SCS) | Sanjay Ramasamy | 53,217 | 56.07% | New |
| JD | G. Veerasamy | 33,816 | 35.63% | New |
| PMK | S. Mookiah | 3,192 | 3.36% | New |
| Independent | N. D. Murugah | 657 | 0.69% | New |
| Independent | S. V. P. R. Pandiarajan | 571 | 0.60% | New |
| Margin of victory | | 19,401 | 20.44% | 15.23% |
| Turnout | | 94,911 | 60.99% | −11.26% |
| Registered electors | | 164,459 | | |
| INS(SCS) gain from INC | | Swing | 24.07% | |

=== 1989 ===
1989 Tamil Nadu Legislative Assembly election: Virudhunagar
| Party | Candidate | Votes | % | ±% |
|---|---|---|---|---|
| INC | R. Chokkar | 34,106 | 32.00% | New |
| JP | A. S. A. Arumugam | 28,548 | 26.78% | New |
| AIADMK | N. Srinivasan | 26,488 | 24.85% | −13.02 |
| Independent | G. Ganesan | 10,599 | 9.94% | New |
| Independent | P. Karuppasmay | 1,317 | 1.24% | New |
| Independent | V. Pugazhendhi | 599 | 0.56% | New |
| Margin of victory | | 5,558 | 5.21% | −2.28% |
| Turnout | | 106,584 | 72.25% | −2.88% |
| Registered electors | | 150,275 | | |
| INC gain from JP | | Swing | -13.36% | |

=== 1984 ===
1984 Tamil Nadu Legislative Assembly election: Virudhunagar
| Party | Candidate | Votes | % | ±% |
|---|---|---|---|---|
| JP | A. S. A. Arumugam | 42,852 | 45.36% | New |
| AIADMK | M. Sundararajan | 35,776 | 37.87% | −10.99 |
| Independent | K. Selvam | 14,876 | 15.75% | New |
| Independent | P. Panneerselvam | 518 | 0.55% | New |
| Margin of victory | | 7,076 | 7.49% | −5.39% |
| Turnout | | 94,472 | 75.13% | 7.06% |
| Registered electors | | 131,781 | | |
| JP gain from AIADMK | | Swing | -3.50% | |

=== 1980 ===
1980 Tamil Nadu Legislative Assembly election: Virudhunagar
| Party | Candidate | Votes | % | ±% |
|---|---|---|---|---|
| AIADMK | M. Sundararajan | 40,285 | 48.86% | +4.34 |
| DMK | P. Seenivasan | 29,665 | 35.98% | +24.76 |
| JP | S. Balasubramanian | 12,504 | 15.16% | New |
| Margin of victory | | 10,620 | 12.88% | −0.93% |
| Turnout | | 82,454 | 68.07% | 7.64% |
| Registered electors | | 122,637 | | |
| AIADMK hold | | Swing | 4.34% | |

=== 1977 ===
1977 Tamil Nadu Legislative Assembly election: Virudhunagar
| Party | Candidate | Votes | % | ±% |
|---|---|---|---|---|
| AIADMK | M. Sundararajan | 33,077 | 44.52% | New |
| JP | A. S. A. Arumugam | 22,820 | 30.71% | New |
| DMK | K. S. Kandaswamy | 8,331 | 11.21% | −38.67 |
| INC | S. Narvaneetha Krishnan | 7,520 | 10.12% | New |
| Independent | V. Chinniah | 1,747 | 2.35% | New |
| AIFB | A. Velu | 803 | 1.08% | New |
| Margin of victory | | 10,257 | 13.81% | 11.30% |
| Turnout | | 74,298 | 60.43% | −15.29% |
| Registered electors | | 124,439 | | |
| AIADMK gain from DMK | | Swing | -5.36% | |

=== 1971 ===
1971 Tamil Nadu Legislative Assembly election: Virudhunagar
| Party | Candidate | Votes | % | ±% |
|---|---|---|---|---|
| DMK | P. Seenivasan | 31,455 | 49.88% | −0.02 |
| SWA | V. Seenivasaga Naidu | 29,878 | 47.38% | New |
| Independent | K. M. Arunachalam | 727 | 1.15% | New |
| Independent | A. Seenivasan | 712 | 1.13% | New |
| Margin of victory | | 1,577 | 2.50% | 0.58% |
| Turnout | | 63,060 | 75.73% | −8.52% |
| Registered electors | | 87,783 | | |
| DMK hold | | Swing | -0.02% | |

=== 1967 ===
1967 Madras Legislative Assembly election: Virudhunagar
| Party | Candidate | Votes | % | ±% |
|---|---|---|---|---|
| DMK | P. Seenivasan | 33,421 | 49.90% | New |
| INC | K. Kamaraj | 32,136 | 47.98% | New |
| Independent | R. Periakaruppan | 838 | 1.25% | New |
| Independent | K. P. Nadar | 579 | 0.86% | New |
| Margin of victory | | 1,285 | 1.92% | New |
| Turnout | | 66,974 | 84.25% | |
| Registered electors | | 82,606 | | |
| DMK win (new seat) | | | | |

=== 1952 ===
1952 Madras Legislative Assembly election: Virudhunagar
| Party | Candidate | Votes | % | ±% |
|---|---|---|---|---|
| Independent | V. V. Ramasami | 22,811 | 46.67% | New |
| INC | Sankarapandia Nadar | 22,307 | 45.64% | New |
| Independent | Doraswami Nadar | 2,076 | 4.25% | New |
| Socialist Party (India) | Rangaswami Reddiar | 1,684 | 3.45% | New |
| Margin of victory | | 504 | 1.03% | |
| Turnout | | 48,878 | 75.97% | |
| Registered electors | | 64,339 | | |
| Independent win (new seat) | | | | |
