= Kasi Viswanathar Temple, Sivakasi =

Kasi Viswanathar Temple
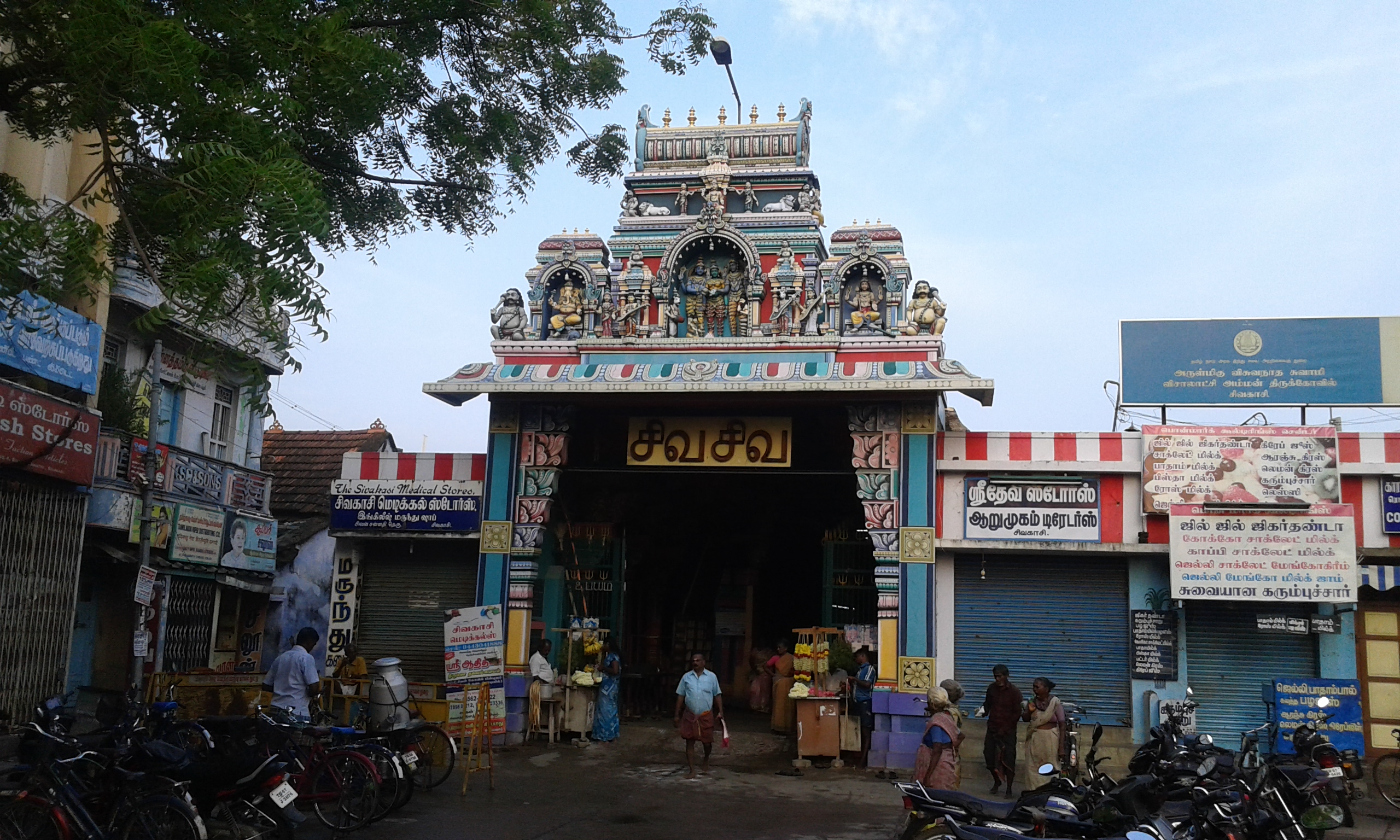

- Kasi Viswanathar Temple, Sivakasi, Virudhunagar, Tamil Nadu

Religion
- Affiliation: Hinduism
- District: Virudhunagar
- Deity: Kasi Viswanathar (Shiva) Visalakshi (Parvathi)

Location
- Location: Sivakasi
- State: Tamil Nadu
- Country: India
- Interactive map of Kasi Viswanathar Temple
- Coordinates: 9°27′01″N 77°47′44″E

Architecture
- Type: South Indian architecture

Kasi Viswanathar Temple in Sivakasi, a town in Virudhunagar district in the South Indian state of Tamil Nadu, is dedicated to the Hindu god Shiva. Constructed in the South Indian style of architecture, the temple is believed to have been built by Pandyan ruler Harikesari Parakkirama Pandian during the 16th century, with later additions from Madurai Nayaks. Shiva is worshipped as Kasi Viswanathar and his consort Parvathi as Visalakshi. The temple was the scene of temple entry movement in 1899, followed by Sivakasi riots when 22 people were killed.

A granite wall surrounds the temple, enclosing all its shrines. The temple is open from 6 am - 12 pm and 4 - 8:30 pm on all days except during new moon days when it is open the full day. Four daily rituals and three yearly festivals are held at the temple, of which the Brahmostavam festival during the Tamil month of Vaiakasi (May - June) being the most prominent. The temple is maintained and administered by the Hindu Religious and Endowment Board of the Government of Tamil Nadu.

== Legend ==
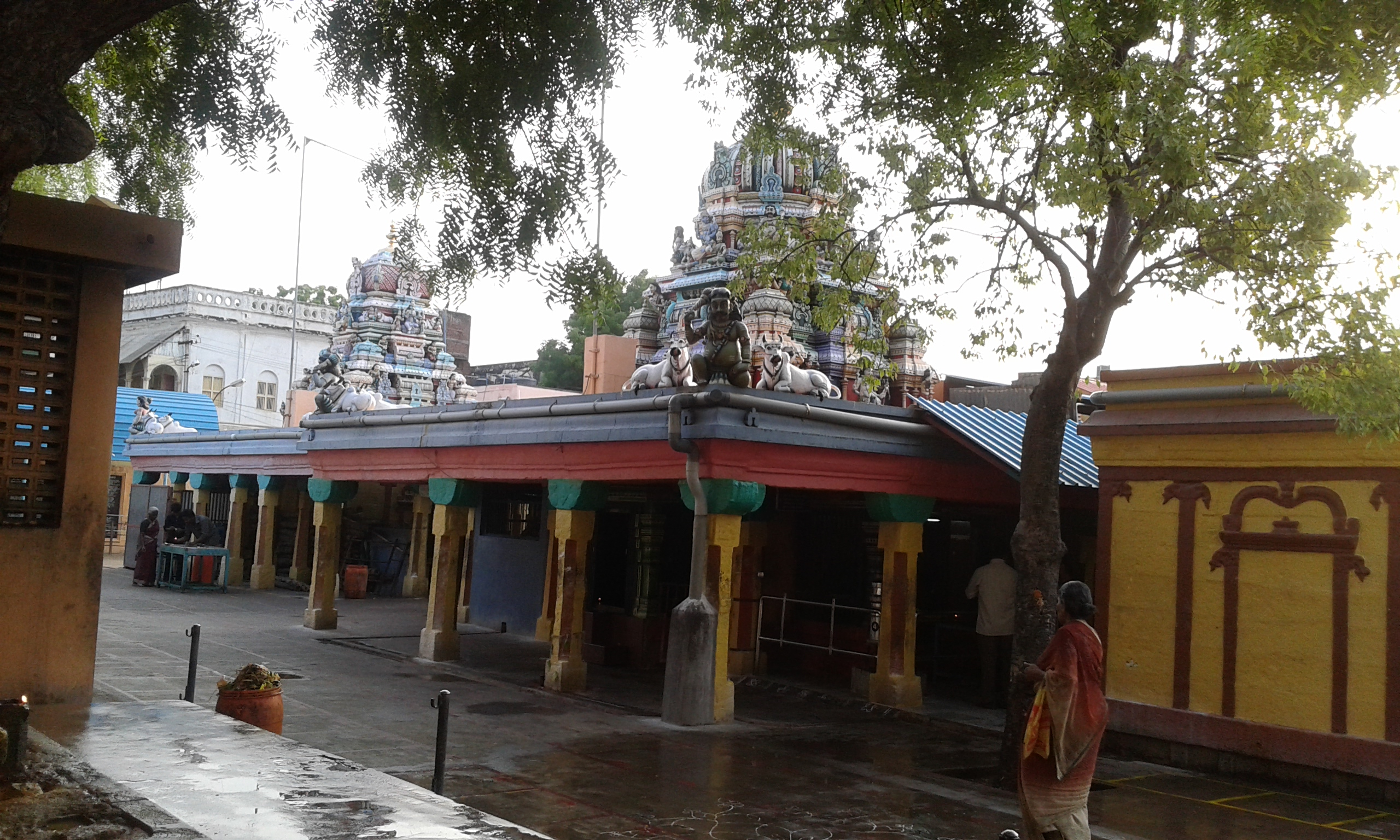
The first precinct

As per Hindu legend, a Pandya king Harikesari Parakkirama Pandian wanted to construct a temple for Hindu god Shiva at Tenkasi and went to Kasi to bring a lingam, the most common iconic representation of Shiva in South India. While returning to his palace with the prized lingam, he rested under the grove of a vilva tree, the favourite tree of Shiva. When a cow carrying the lingam refused to move from the spot, the king realised that it was a divine wish of Shiva, and he placed the lingam in the place where the cow halted. The place where the "shivalingam brought from Kasi" was installed came to be known as Sivakasi. Since he brought the lingam from Kasi, it came to be known as Kasi Viswanathar temple.

== History ==
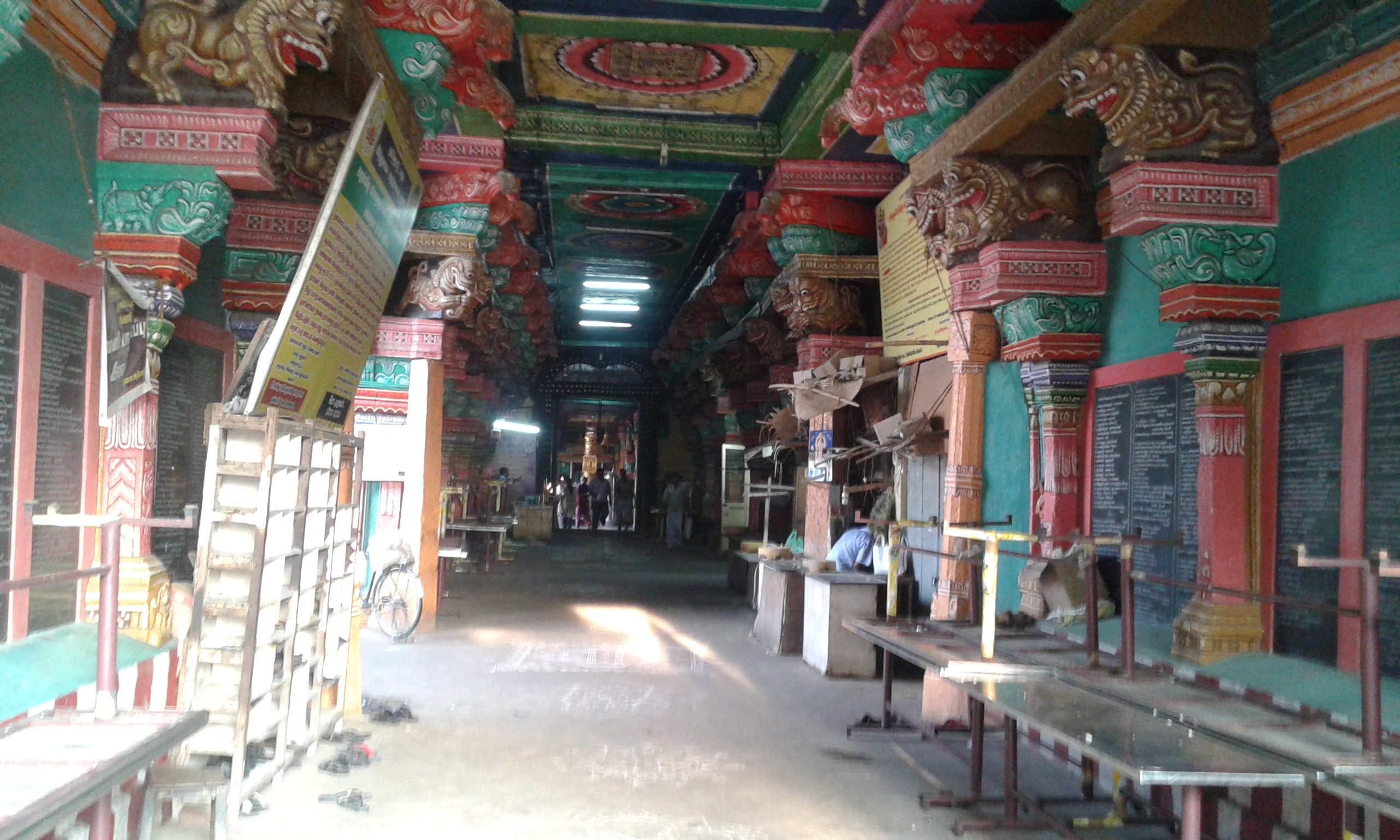
Pillared hall leading to the sanctum

Sivakasi was established during the early 15th century CE. Between 1428 and 1460, a Pandya king Harikesari Parakkirama Pandian ruled the southern part of Madurai region, comprising the modern day Sivakasi and it surroundings. Sivakasi was a part of Madurai region during the 16th century. Madurai became independent from Vijayanagar Empire in 1559 under the Nayaks and the temple started receiving gifts from the rulers of the dynasty. There are no indication of history of the temple after the Nayak rule ended in 1736 and Madurai was repeatedly captured several times by Chanda Sahib (1740 – 1754), Arcot Nawab and Muhammed Yusuf Khan (1725 – 1764) in the middle of 18th century. In 1801, Madurai came under the direct control of the British East India Company and was annexed to the Madras Presidency.

During the 1800s, Nadars, then aspiring business community, established their commercial base in the town. By the end of the 19th century, the Nadars’ rapid rise as a business community lead to confrontation with the Maravars. The Nadars were denied entry to the temple and when they tried to enter in 1899, it led to a series of riots which became known as the Sivakasi riots. A total of 22 people were killed, as many as 800 houses and Big chariot in center of the city (used by temple during festival) were burnt during the riots. Eventually the riots came to an end after the intervention of the military in mid-July 1899. The temple is maintained and administered by the Hindu Religious and Endowment Board of the Government of Tamil Nadu.

== Architecture ==
The temple is located in the Bazaar street, a busy business locality in Sivakasi. The temple has a three-tiered gopuram (temple tower). The temple has a pillared hall from the entrance leading to the flagstaff hall. The sanctum is located axial to the entrance facing east. The image of Kasi Viswanathar in the form of lingam is housed in the sanctum. The images of Vinayaka and Subramanya are located on either side of the hall leading to the sanctum. The shrine of Sivakami is located parallel to the sanctum facing East. There is a second flagstaff located axial to the Sivakami shrine and perpendicular to the flagstaff facing Viswanathar shrine. The right of the main entrance facing the Sivakami shrine is the temple water tank. There are smaller shrines of Ayyappa, Dakshinamurthy, Arumugar, Durga, Navagrahas and Nataraja in the precinct around the shrines of Kasi Viswanatha and Visalakshi.

== Festival ==
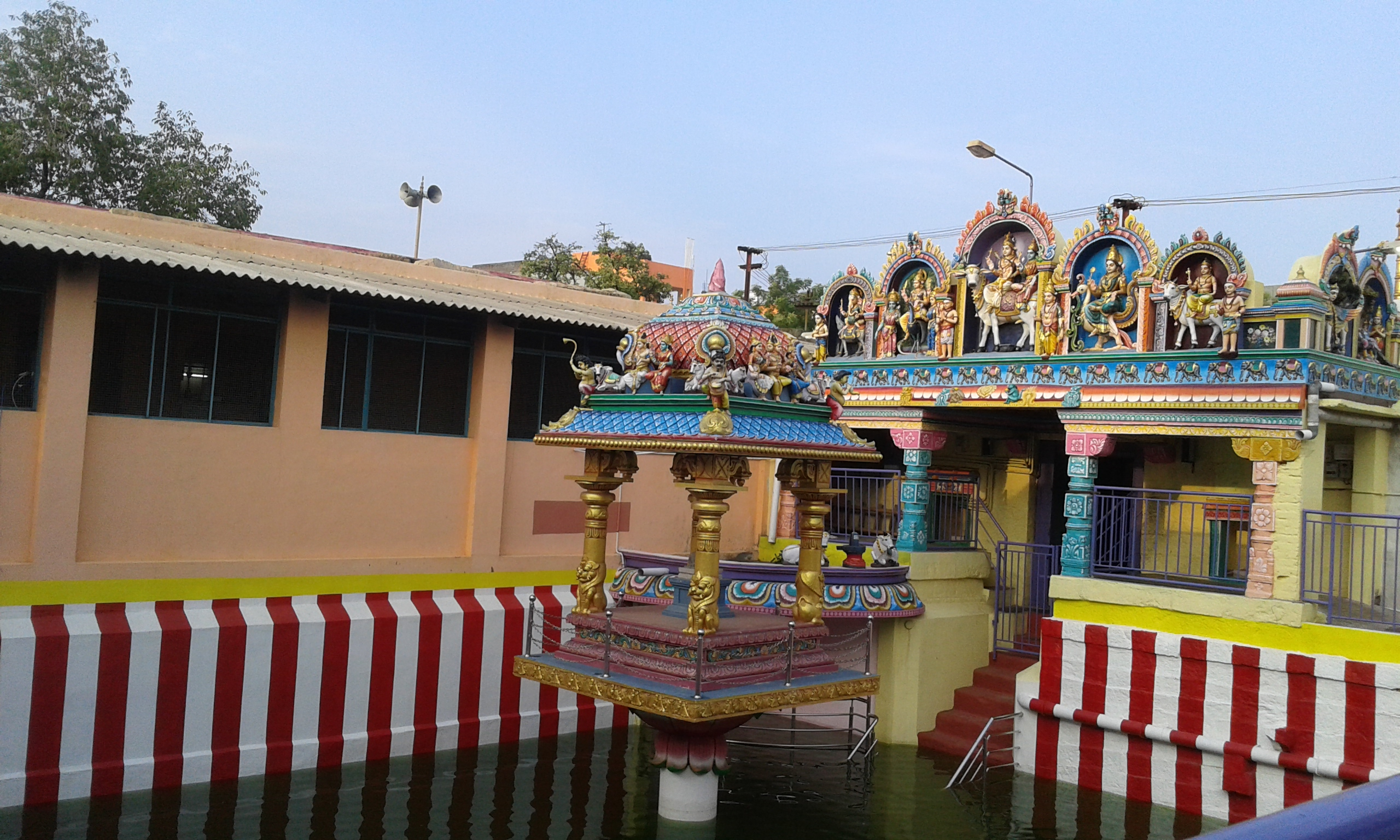
The temple tank

The temple follows Saivite tradition. The temple priests perform the pooja (rituals) during festivals and on a daily basis. The temple rituals are performed four times a day: Kalasanthi at 8:30 a.m., Uchikalam at 11:30 p.m., Sayarakshai at 5:30 p.m., and Aravanai Pooja between 8:00 - 8:00 p.m. There are weekly, monthly and fortnightly rituals performed in the temple. The temple is open from 6am - 12 pm and 4-8:30 pm on all days except during festival days when it is open the full day. There are various festivals celebrated in the temple. The Brahmostavam festival during the Tamil month of Vaiakasi (May - June) is the most prominent festival celebrated in the temple. Nataraja Thirumanjana during Aani (June - July), Visalakshi Tapas festival during Aadi (July - August), Moola festival during Aavani (August - September), Navarathri, Soorasamharam during Aipassi (October - November), Karthikai festival, Thiruvathirai, Thaipoosam, Sivarathri, Panguni Uthiram are the other festival celebrated in the temple.
