= K. Ramasamy (politician) =

Indian politician

K. Ramasamy was an Indian politician and former Member of the Legislative Assembly. He was elected to the Tamil Nadu legislative assembly as a Janata Party candidate from Sivakasi constituency in 1977 election. In addition he served as Chairman of Chairman of Sivakasi Panchayat Union for over 25 years. He later rejoined in Congress party. He is also related to actress Sridevi who was his brother Ayyapan's daughter.
