= Standard Fireworks (India) =

Indian manufacturing company

- Company type: Private
- Industry: Safety matches, fireworks
- Founded: 1942 Sivakasi, Tamil Nadu, India
- Founder: N.R.K. Rajarathnam
- Headquarters: Sivakasi, Tamil Nadu, India
- Key people: Shri. K.A.A. Sankaralingam, Shri. K.A.A. Arunachalam, Shri. A. Chelladurai and Shri. Yennarkay.R. Ravindran
- Products: Matches, sparklers, fireworks
- Website: standardfireworks.in

Standard Fireworks is a company based in Sivakasi, Tamil Nadu, India, which manufactures safety matches, firecrackers, and other fireworks. It was founded by N. R. K. Rajarathnam in 1942 in Sivakasi. The company started by manufacturing matchsticks and later expanded to fireworks.

First directors of standard fireworks were K.A.A.Sankaralingam, K.A.A.Arunachalam, A.Chelladurai and Yennarkay R Ravindran

Standard Fireworks has partnerships with China-based manufacturers.

The company reported a 45% market-share in India and 5% of global exports. Standard Fireworks' Sivakasi facilities are spread over 3.7 kilometres (2.3 mi) land, using only 10% of the total land area out of environmental and safety concerns. The company employs over 10,000 personnel.
