= Thondar Duraiswamy =

Indian comrade in the Indian freedom struggle movement

Thondar Duraiswamy Nadar
- Born: 31 October 1915; Sivakasi, Tamilnadu
- Died: 10 October 1971 (aged 55)
- Occupation: comrade

"Thondar" Duraiswamy Nadar (Tamil: தொண்டர் துரைசுவாமி நாடார் ) (31 October 1915 – 10 October 1971) was an Indian comrade in the Indian freedom struggle movement. He belonged to Sivakasi, a small town in the Indian state of Tamil Nadu. He participated most actively along with K. Kamaraj in the struggles of the freedom movement. The local people gave him the title of "Thondar", a good soul who serves selflessly and also have named a social study place padipagam as Thondar Duraiswamy Ninaivu Padipagam in Sivakasi.

He went to jail and became communist behind prison walls. Duraiswamy worked in the press Janasakthi as a proof reader.

The famous Tamil writer Dandapani Jayakanthan claims "Thondar" Duraiswamy as mentor of his early days in his book A Literary Man's Political Experiences he also narrates that "Thondar Duraiswamy, during those days used to narrate him in simple language, story after story relating to freedom movement. 'Thondar' also had many interesting tales to tell about Kamaraj Annachi (elder brother)."
