= S. Dhamodharan =

Indian politician

S. Dhamodharan was an Indian politician and former Member of the Legislative Assembly. He was elected to the Tamil Nadu Legislative Assembly as a Tamil Maanila Congress (Moopanar) candidate from Virudhunagar constituency in 2001 election.
