= Sivakasi Assembly constituency =

State Legislative Assembly Constituency in Tamil Nadu, India

Coordinates: 9.46°N 77.80°E

Sivakasi
- Constituency No. 205 for the Tamil Nadu Legislative Assembly

Constituency details
- Country: India
- Region: South India
- State: Tamil Nadu
- Lok Sabha constituency: Virudhunagar
- Established: 1957
- Total electors: 228,205

Member of Legislative Assembly
- 17th Tamil Nadu Legislative Assembly
- Incumbent S. Keerthana
- Party: TVK
- Elected year: 2026

Sivakasi is an assembly constituency located in Virudhunagar district in Tamil Nadu. It falls under Virudhunagar Lok Sabha constituency. The constituency has been in existence since the 1957 election. It is one of the 234 State Legislative Assembly Constituencies in Tamil Nadu, in India.

== Members of Legislative Assembly ==
Year	Member	Political party
Madras State
1957	S. Ramasami Naidu	Indian National Congress
1962	S. Ramasami Naidu	Indian National Congress
1967	S. Alagu Thevar	Swatantra Party
Tamil Nadu
1971	K. Kalimuthu	Dravida Munnetra Kazhagam
1977	K. Ramasamy	Janata Party
1980	V. Balakrishnan	All India Anna Dravida Munnetra Kazhagam
1984	V. Balakrishnan	All India Anna Dravida Munnetra Kazhagam
1989	P. Seenivasan	Dravida Munnetra Kazhagam
1991	J. Balagangadharan	All India Anna Dravida Munnetra Kazhagam
1996	R. Chokkar	Tamil Maanila Congress
2001	A. Rajagopal	Tamil Maanila Congress
2006	R. Gnanadoss	Marumalarchi Dravida Munnetra Kazhagam
2011	K. T. Rajenthra Bhalaji	All India Anna Dravida Munnetra Kazhagam
2016	K. T. Rajenthra Bhalaji	All India Anna Dravida Munnetra Kazhagam
2021	A. M. S. G. Ashokan	Indian National Congress
2026	S. Keerthana	Tamilaga Vettri Kazhagam

== Election results ==
Vote share of winning candidates
2026	35.56%
2021	42.66%
2016	43.67%
2011	59.17%
2006	43.71%
2001	42.45%
1996	40.14%
1991	66.75%
1989	31.20%
1984	38.73%
1980	61.32%
1977	31.11%
1971	59.42%
1967	55.73%
1962	57.62%
1957	53.72%

=== 2026 ===
2026 Tamil Nadu Legislative Assembly election: Sivakasi
Party	Candidate	Votes	%	±%
TVK	S. Keerthana	68,709	35.56	New
INC	Ashokan G	57,039	29.52	▼13.55
AIADMK	Rajenthrabhalaji K. T	51,078	26.45	▼7.17
NTK	Esther Mary Diana A	10,191	5.27	▼6.11
NOTA	NOTA	948	0.49	
Margin of victory		11670	6.04	
Turnout		193128	80.00	
Registered electors		241,403		
TVK gain from INC		Swing		

=== 2021 ===
2021 Tamil Nadu Legislative Assembly election: Sivakasi
Party	Candidate	Votes	%	±%
INC	A. M. S. G. Ashokan	78,947	43.07	+7.79
AIADMK	Lakshmi Ganesan	61,628	33.62	−10.06
NTK	R. Kanagapriya	20,865	11.38	+9.53
AMMK	G. Samikkalai	9,893	5.40	New
MNM	S. Mugunthan	6,090	3.32	New
NOTA	NOTA	1,727	0.94	−0.6
Independent	E. Lakshmanan	1,430	0.78	New
Margin of victory		17,319	9.45	1.05
Turnout		183,320	70.02	−3.87
Rejected ballots		61	0.03	
Registered electors		261,809		
INC gain from AIADMK		Swing	-0.61	

=== 2016 ===
2016 Tamil Nadu Legislative Assembly election: Sivakasi
Party	Candidate	Votes	%	±%
AIADMK	K. T. Rajenthra Bhalaji	76,734	43.67	−15.49
INC	C. Sreeraja	61,986	35.28	New
DMDK	R. Sudhakaran	17,379	9.89	New
BJP	A. G. Parrathashaarathi	6,189	3.52	+0.68
NTK	T. Babu	3,245	1.85	New
NOTA	NOTA	2,704	1.54	New
PMK	M. Thilagabama	1,350	0.77	New
Independent	S. Thaneswaran	1,235	0.70	New
AIFB	V. Maharajan	981	0.56	New
Margin of victory		14,748	8.39	−15.76
Turnout		175,702	73.89	−7.15
Registered electors		237,773		
AIADMK hold		Swing	-15.49	

=== 2011 ===
2011 Tamil Nadu Legislative Assembly election: Sivakasi
Party	Candidate	Votes	%	±%
AIADMK	K. T. Rajenthra Bhalaji	87,333	59.17	New
DMK	T. Vanaraja	51,679	35.01	−3.63
BJP	P. Meera Devi	4,198	2.84	+2.04
Margin of victory		35,654	24.16	19.09
Turnout		147,605	81.05	8.99
Registered electors		182,125		
AIADMK gain from MDMK		Swing	15.46	

=== 2006 ===
2006 Tamil Nadu Legislative Assembly election: Sivakasi
Party	Candidate	Votes	%	±%
MDMK	R. Gnanadoss	79,992	43.71	+27.98
DMK	V. Thangaraj	70,721	38.65	−0.12
DMDK	V. Rajendran	12,657	6.92	New
AIFB	T. Manikandan	8,329	4.55	New
BSP	K. Rajendran	5,698	3.11	New
Independent	J. Ragmathullah	1,961	1.07	New
BJP	G. Paratha Sarathy	1,476	0.81	New
Margin of victory		9,271	5.07	1.38
Turnout		183,001	72.06	11.58
Registered electors		253,957		
MDMK gain from TMC(M)		Swing	1.26	

=== 2001 ===
2001 Tamil Nadu Legislative Assembly election: Sivakasi
Party	Candidate	Votes	%	±%
TMC(M)	A. Rajagopal	65,954	42.45	New
DMK	Thangaraj V	60,233	38.77	New
MDMK	Ravichandran A	24,447	15.74	−5.17
Independent	G. Jeevanandham	1,593	1.03	New
Puratchi Bharatham	G. Lourduraj	1,152	0.74	New
Margin of victory		5,721	3.68	−8.58
Turnout		155,367	60.48	−8.31
Registered electors		256,918		
TMC(M) hold		Swing	2.31	

=== 1996 ===
1996 Tamil Nadu Legislative Assembly election: Sivakasi
Party	Candidate	Votes	%	±%
TMC(M)	R. Chokkar	61,322	40.14	New
AIADMK	N. Alagarsamy	42,590	27.88	−38.87
MDMK	R. Gnanadoss	31,933	20.90	New
Independent	V. Alagarsamy	4,867	3.19	New
Independent	V. Balakrishnan	2,699	1.77	New
BJP	S. P. A. Vinokara Vijaya Anand	1,738	1.14	New
Independent	R. Durairaj	1,577	1.03	New
Independent	S. Muniyandi	952	0.62	New
JP	M. Jesudoss	892	0.58	New
Margin of victory		18,732	12.26	−25.31
Turnout		152,781	68.79	6.16
Registered electors		235,416		
TMC(M) gain from AIADMK		Swing	-26.61	

=== 1991 ===
1991 Tamil Nadu Legislative Assembly election: Sivakasi
Party	Candidate	Votes	%	±%
AIADMK	J. Balagangadharan	84,785	66.75	+44.49
DMK	B. Rajaram Boopathi	37,059	29.17	−2.02
PMK	M. Dharmar	1,258	0.99	New
Independent	A. Rayappan	1,204	0.95	New
Independent	S. Haridoss	1,010	0.80	New
Margin of victory		47,726	37.57	33.07
Turnout		127,025	62.63	−9.35
Registered electors		208,155		
AIADMK gain from DMK		Swing	35.55	

=== 1989 ===
1989 Tamil Nadu Legislative Assembly election: Sivakasi
Party	Candidate	Votes	%	±%
DMK	P. Seenivasan	41,027	31.20	New
INC	K. Ayyappan	35,112	26.70	New
AIADMK	V. Balakrishnan	29,268	22.26	−16.47
Independent	S. Periyasamy	15,011	11.41	New
Independent	K. Karuppiah	5,399	4.11	New
Independent	T. Alagar Ramanujam	754	0.57	New
Independent	P. Rathinasabapathy	743	0.57	New
Independent	M. Manmathan	712	0.54	New
Margin of victory		5,915	4.50	−5.53
Turnout		131,503	71.98	−2.45
Registered electors		185,980		
DMK gain from AIADMK		Swing	-7.53	

=== 1984 ===
1984 Tamil Nadu Legislative Assembly election: Sivakasi
Party	Candidate	Votes	%	±%
AIADMK	V. Balakrishnan	41,731	38.73	−22.59
Independent	N. Perumal Samy	30,930	28.71	New
Independent	A. S. Graham	29,736	27.60	New
Independent	G. Muthusamy	2,315	2.15	New
Independent	Gnanaseelant	910	0.84	New
Margin of victory		10,801	10.02	−19.70
Turnout		107,745	74.43	10.15
Registered electors		151,831		
AIADMK hold		Swing	-22.59	

=== 1980 ===
1980 Tamil Nadu Legislative Assembly election: Sivakasi
Party	Candidate	Votes	%	±%
AIADMK	V. Balakrishnan	53,081	61.32	+33
DMK	S. Alagu Thevar	27,348	31.59	+21.76
JP	P. Alagar Rajan	4,084	4.72	New
Independent	M. Jesudos	549	0.63	New
Margin of victory		25,733	29.73	27.48
Turnout		86,561	64.27	−0.07
Registered electors		135,976		
AIADMK gain from JP		Swing	30.21	

=== 1977 ===
1977 Tamil Nadu Legislative Assembly election: Sivakasi
Party	Candidate	Votes	%	±%
JP	K. Ramasamy	24,518	31.11	New
INC	Dharmar	22,746	28.87	New
AIADMK	K. Ponnupandian	22,315	28.32	New
DMK	S. Amudan	7,753	9.84	−49.58
Independent	K. Kaliappa Nadar	1,079	1.37	New
Margin of victory		1,772	2.25	−19.17
Turnout		78,800	64.34	−7.89
Registered electors		123,965		
JP gain from DMK		Swing	-28.30	

=== 1971 ===
1971 Tamil Nadu Legislative Assembly election: Sivakasi
Party	Candidate	Votes	%	±%
DMK	K. Kalimuthu	39,854	59.42	New
SWA	N. Sundararaj Naicker	25,486	38.00	New
Independent	K. Muthunadar	1,063	1.58	New
Independent	S. K. Gurusamy	671	1.00	New
Margin of victory		14,368	21.42	4.74
Turnout		67,074	72.23	−6.89
Registered electors		101,587		
DMK gain from SWA		Swing	3.69	

=== 1967 ===
1967 Madras Legislative Assembly election: Sivakasi
Party	Candidate	Votes	%	±%
SWA	S. Alagu Thevar	38,416	55.73	New
INC	R. R. Thevar	26,918	39.05	−18.57
Independent	V. Chinniah	2,402	3.48	New
Independent	P. Nagarathinam	1,200	1.74	New
Margin of victory		11,498	16.68	−3.72
Turnout		68,936	79.12	11.10
Registered electors		90,594		
SWA gain from INC		Swing	-1.89	

=== 1962 ===
1962 Madras Legislative Assembly election: Sivakasi
Party	Candidate	Votes	%	±%
INC	S. Ramaswamy Naidu	35,726	57.62	+3.9
SWA	K. Doraisamy Thevar	23,078	37.22	New
Independent	M. Prakasam	3,203	5.17	New
Margin of victory		12,648	20.40	−9.08
Turnout		62,007	68.02	13.89
Registered electors		95,665		
INC hold		Swing	3.90	

=== 1957 ===
1957 Madras Legislative Assembly election: Sivakasi
Party	Candidate	Votes	%	±%
INC	S. Ramaswamy Naidu	25,421	53.72	New
Independent	P. Muthuramanuja Thevar	11,471	24.24	New
Independent	A. Subbiah	8,767	18.53	New
Independent	V. Karuppiah	1,665	3.52	New
Margin of victory		13,950	29.48	
Turnout		47,324	54.13	
Registered electors		87,423		
INC win (new seat)				
