= S. Keerthana =

Indian politician (born 1996)

Cabinet Minister Government of Tamil Nadu
- Incumbent
- Assumed office 10 May 2026
- Minister: Industries, Investment Promotions and Commerce
- Governor: R. V. Arlekar
- Chief Minister: C. Joseph Vijay
- Preceded by: T. R. B. Rajaa

Member of the Tamil Nadu Legislative Assembly
- Incumbent
- Assumed office 11 May 2026
- Preceded by: A. M. S. G. Ashokan
- Constituency: Sivakasi

Personal details
- Born: 1996 (age 29–30) Kovilangulam, Aruppukkottai, Virudhunagar district, Tamil Nadu
- Party: Tamilaga Vettri Kazhagam
- Parent(s): Sampath; Vijayalakshmi
- Occupation: Politician; political consultant

Sampath Keerthana (born 1996) is an Indian politician and political consultant from Tamil Nadu. She is a member of the Tamil Nadu Legislative Assembly from Sivakasi in Virudhunagar district representing the Tamilaga Vettri Kazhagam. On 10 May 2026, she was sworn in as the Minister for Industries, becoming the youngest in Vijay's cabinet and the first woman to serve as Tamil Nadu's Minister for Industries.

== Early life and education ==
Keerthana was born in 1996 in Kovilangulam village, near Aruppukkottai, Virudhunagar district. Her parents are Sampath, a financial consultant, and Vijayalakshmi, a homemaker. She attended Kshatriya Girls Higher Secondary School, Virudhunagar, studying in the Tamil medium. She then graduated with a B.Sc. in mathematics from V.P.M.M Arts and Science College for Women, Krishnankoil, which is affiliated with Madurai Kamaraj University. Later, she did her M.Sc. in statistics from Pondicherry Central University in 2019.

== Career ==
Before entering politics, Keerthana engaged in social work through the Piramal Foundation, focusing on women's empowerment and upgrading government schools across the slum areas of Thane in Maharashtra. She later worked as a political consultant and digital strategist with firms such as I-PAC and Showtime Consulting, collaborating with political leaders including M. K. Stalin, Mamata Banerjee and N. Chandrababu Naidu.

Keerthana became an MLA for the first time winning her debut 2026 Tamil Nadu Legislative Assembly election from Sivakasi Assembly constituency representing the TVK party. She polled 68,809 votes and defeated her nearest rival, Ashokan G of the Indian National Congress, by a margin of 11,670 votes.

=== Minister for Industries and Investment Promotion (2026–present) ===
During Keerthana's tenure as Industries Minister, Tamil Nadu faced competition from neighbouring Andhra Pradesh f and lost major industrial investment opportunities to the latter. The cancellation or suspension of infrastructure projects, including the Parandur greenfield airport, Cheyyar industrial corridor highway tenders and other road projects by the TVK government lead by C. Joseph Vijay, raised concerns about infrastructure continuity and investor confidence. Three South Korean automotive component manufacturers supplying Hyundai and Kia chose Andhra Pradesh for expansion projects worth a combined ₹1,614 crore, despite having earlier held discussions with the previous DMK government about establishing or expanding operations in Tamil Nadu. Separately, Royal Enfield announced a ₹2,200 crore investment in Andhra Pradesh for a new manufacturing facility, marking its first major manufacturing expansion outside Tamil Nadu since its establishment in 1901.

In August 2026, the Andhra Pradesh Economic Development Board conducted investor roadshows in Chennai and Coimbatore to attract companies from Tamil Nadu, particularly in the textile, automobile and manufacturing sectors. The initiative was reported as the first time Andhra Pradesh had organised investor meetings in Tamil Nadu, drawing criticism over concerns that it could divert investments and industrial opportunities to Andhra Pradesh, potentially affecting Tamil Nadu's economy. However, Tamil Nadu's Industries Department stated that companies were free to participate in investment-promotion events organised by other states.

== Controversies ==
After the victory in the 2026 election, she was in a spotlight when she spoke in Hindi during some public interactions but she defended herself and stated that her goal was to help a wider audience connect with Vijay’s message.

Keerthana faced criticism for using the Tamil term 'Oonamutror' while referring to persons with disabilities during a media interaction. She promptly issued a public apology on 13 May 2026, clarifying that the remark was an inadvertent error due to ignorance rather than an intent to disrespect. Highlighting that she is the daughter of a disabled mother and understands their daily struggles, she appealed to the public not to politicise the issue.

Keerthana faced criticism following the circulation of a video showing her smiling during a media interaction related to the Coimbatore child assault-murder, with opposition leaders alleging her conduct was insensitive. She clarified in a statement on 24 May 2026 that her natural smile occurred simply as the press session concluded and was not a reaction to the tragedy. Expressing distress over the incident, she stated that her body language was misinterpreted and politically distorted to spread misinformation.

In July 2026, Keerthana faced criticism after a video showed her questioning a student in English during an inspection of a government girls' school near Sivakasi, with critics raising concerns over her remarks regarding the student's English proficiency in front of classmates. She faced criticism for publicly embarrassing a student, making remarks about last-bench students, and allegedly using schoolchildren for publicity. Critics said the interaction could undermine students' confidence and called for guidelines on ministers' conduct during school inspections. In response, Keerthana defended her actions on social media, clarifying thatI made mistakes, I learnt, and I am still learning. I am not ashamed of that. She herself was educated in the Tamil medium and had faced similar struggles with English in the past. Denying allegations of mocking the student, she stated that her goal was to build a supportive environment for government school students to confidently compete globally, while noting that the video was recorded and circulated by the media rather than her office.

During a felicitation event held at her alma mater, the Virudhunagar Kshatriya Girls Higher Secondary School, celebrating her appointment as a Tamil Nadu Minister, Keerthana's remarks referencing 'Kshatriya' faced criticism on social media several social media users and from Dalit organizations for allegedly promoting caste pride in front of students. On the other hand, several social media users defended her, arguing that she may have inadvertently used the term while simply referring to the official name of the school, and urged that the issue should not be intentionally turned into a controversy.

In October 2026, Allegations surfaced Keerthana had received a ₹3 crore commission in connection with a railway overbridge project. Claims were also made regarding the value of a house allegedly linked to her and the jewellery she wore during a visit to Tirupati. Social media users compared her jewellery with the assets declared in her election affidavit, while claims circulated that she owned a house worth ₹10 crore. She denied the allegations, stating that she had neither sought nor accepted a bribe and challenging those making the claims to provide evidence.

== Elections contested and results ==
Elections	Constituency	Result	Vote %	Opposition Candidate	Opposition Party	Opposition vote %
2026	Sivakasi	Won	35.51%	A. M. S. G. Ashokan	INC	29.47%
