= V. V. Ramasami =

Indian politician

V. V. Ramasami was an Indian politician and former Member of the Legislative Assembly. He was elected to the Tamil Nadu legislative assembly as an Independent candidate from Virudhunagar constituency in 1952 election.
