= M. Sundararajan =

Indian politician

M. Sundararajan was an Indian politician and former Member of the Legislative Assembly. He was elected to the Tamil Nadu legislative assembly as an Anna Dravida Munnetra Kazhagam candidate from Virudhunagar constituency in 1977 and 1980 elections. He won the Tamil Nadu election 2021 in sankari
