= A. S. A. Arumugam =

Indian politician

A. S. A. Arumugam was an Indian politician and former Member of the Legislative Assembly. He was elected to the Tamil Nadu legislative assembly as a Janata Party candidate from Virudhunagar constituency in 1984 election.
