= R. Varadarajan =

Indian politician

R. Varadarajan was an Indian politician and former Tamil Nadu Member of the Legislative Assembly. He was elected to the Tamil Nadu legislative assembly as a Marumalarchi Dravida Munnetra Kazhagam candidate from Virudhunagar constituency in 2006 election.
