= List of fireworks accidents and incidents in Sivakasi =

Sivakasi is a town in Virudhunagar District in the Indian state of Tamil Nadu. The town is known for its firecracker, matchbox and printing industries. The industries in Sivakasi employ over 250,000 people with an estimated turn over of ₹20 billion (US$210 million). The major issues in the fireworks industry in Sivakasi are child labour and frequent accidents.

== Background ==
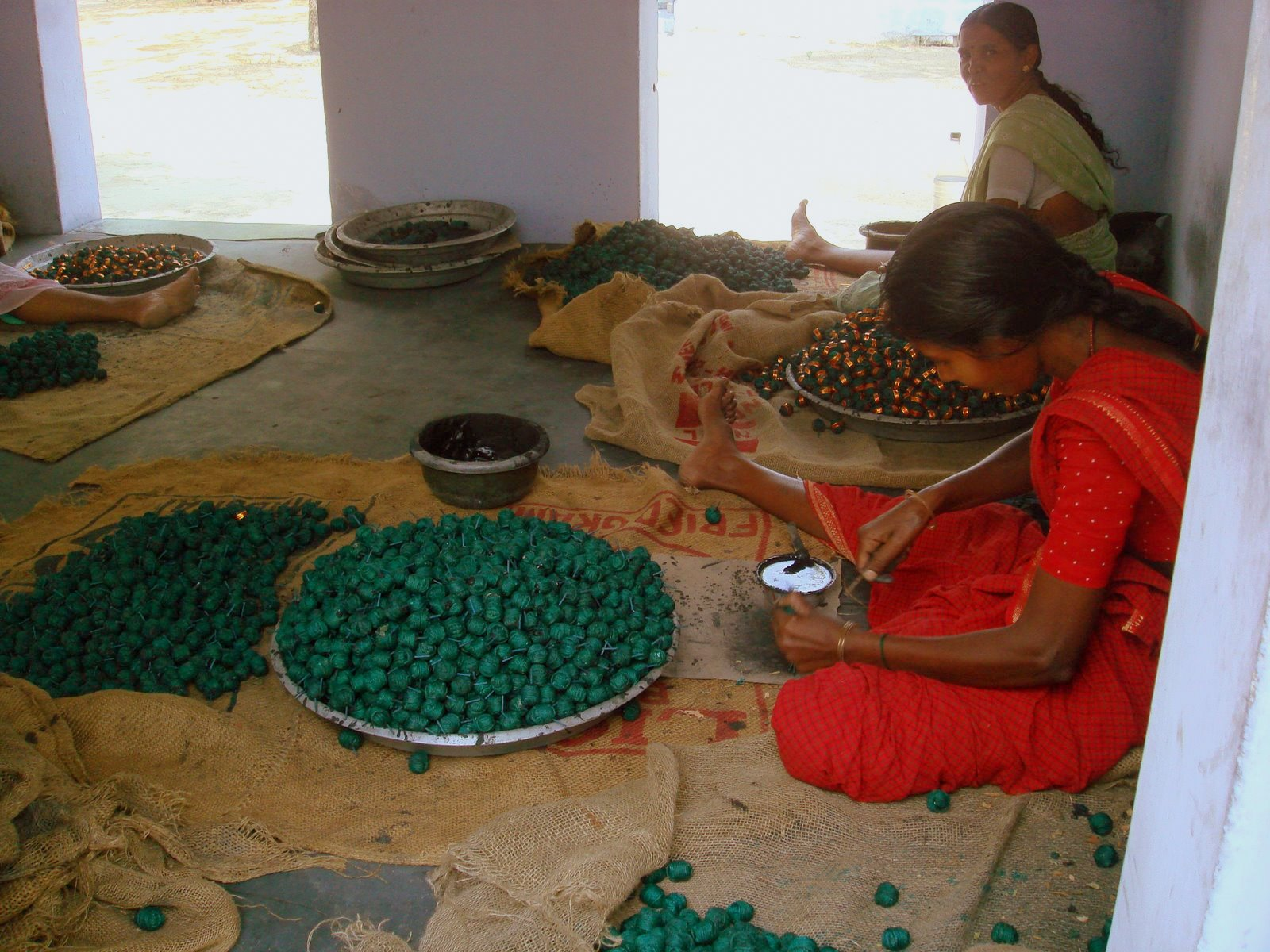
Making of firecrackers

The economy of Sivakasi is dependent on three major industries: firecrackers, matchbox manufacturing, and printing. The town has 520 registered printing industries, 53 match factories, 32 chemical factories, seven soda factories, four flour mills and two rice and oil mills. The town is the nodal center for firecracker manufacturing at the national level. In 2011, the industry employed over 25,000 people and some of the private enterprises had an annual turnover of ₹5 billion (US$52 million). In 2011, the combined estimated turnover of the firecracker, matchbox making and printing industry in the town was around ₹20 billion (US$210 million). Approximately 70% of the firecrackers and matches produced in India are from Sivakasi. The hot and dry climate of the town is conducive to the firecracker and matchbox making industries. The raw materials for these industries were procured from Sattur earlier but were discontinued due to the high power and production cost. The source of raw materials is Kerala and Andaman. The paper for the printing industry is procured from various states. The town is a major producer of diaries, contributing to 30% of the total diaries produced in India. Printing industry in the town was initially utilized for printing labels for the firecrackers and later evolved with modern machinery to grow as a printing hub. In 2012, all the industries suffered 15–20% production loss due to power shortage and escalating labor cost.

The major issues in the fireworks industry in Sivakasi is child labour and frequent accidents. In a blast in 1991 in a factory, 39 people were killed and 65 others were injured. In July 2009, more than 40 people were killed in a fire accident in a firecracker unit. The police traced out unregistered units and irregularities that led to the accident. In a fire accident in August 2011, seven people were killed and five were seriously injured. A similar fire accident and blast in a private unit in September 2012 killed 40 people and injured 38 others. The common reasons cited for the accidents are inadequate training of workers and supervisors involved in different stages of production and marketing of firecracker items. Other reasons are found to be overstocking of explosives, raw material and finished goods, and employment of workers in excess of the permitted strength.

== List of Fireworks accidents and explosions ==
Date	Event	Location	Casualties
20.07.2009	Sri Krishna Fireworks	Namaskarithanpatti	
28.07.2009	Anil Fireworks	Keezha Tiruthangal	
03.08.2009	Classic Fireworks	Meenampatti	
05.09.2012	Om Sakthi Fire works	Mudhalaipatti	
15.05.2013	Meenakshi Fireworks	Kichanayakkanpatti	
22.08.2013	Chidambaram Fireworks	Vilampatty	
25.02.2016	Jonal Fireworks	Chokkalingapuram	
09.06.2016	Krishnasamy Fireworks	Maraneri	
20.10.2016	Whole Sale Shop - Raghavendra Agency	Sivakasi	
11.03.2017	Nagamalli Fireworks	Vetrilai Oorani	
06.04.2018	ARV fireworks	Ramuthevanpatti	
06.04.2018	SKS fireworks	Kakkivadanpatti	
08.09.2018	Factory belonging to Krishnasamy Industries	Kakkivadanpatti	
