= A. Rajagopal =

Indian politician, social worker, and lawyer

Personal details
- Born: Nachiyar patti, Tamil Nadu, India
- Spouse: Visalatchi
- Profession: Social work, Lawyer, Politician

A. Rajagopal is a well-known Indian politician, social worker, lawyer and former Member of the Legislative Assembly. He was elected to the Tamil Nadu legislative assembly as a Tamil Maanila Congress (Moopanar) candidate from Sivakasi constituency in 2001 election.
