= J. Balagangadharan =

Indian politician

J. Balagangadharan (ta: ஜே. பாலகங்காதரன்) was an Indian politician and former Member of the Legislative Assembly. He was elected to the Tamil Nadu legislative assembly as an Anna Dravida Munnetra Kazhagam candidate from Sivakasi constituency in 1991 election.
