= Madathupatti =

- village
- Location in Tamil Nadu, India Madathupatti (India)
- Coordinates: 9°22′30″N 77°46′45″E
- Country: India
- State: Tamil Nadu
- District: Virudhunagar

Languages
  - Official: Tamil
- Time zone: UTC+5:30 (IST)
- Postal code: 626128
- Nearest city: Sivakasi

Madathupatti is a village near Sivakasi in Virudhunagar District, Tamil Nadu, India.

== Religion ==
Madathupatti church was established in the village in 1940.
