= Kovilangulam =

- village
- Location in Tamil Nadu, India Kovilangulam (India)
- Coordinates: 9.559879°N 78.104321°E
- Country: India
- State: Tamil Nadu
- District: Virudhunagar

Area
  - Total: 11.73 km^{2} (4.53 sq mi)

Population (2011)
  - Total: 3,569
- Time zone: UTC+5:30 (IST)
- literacy rate: 75
- Sex ratio: 0.96

Kovilangulam is a village in the Virudhunagar district of Tamil Nadu, popularly known as "Kutti Singapore" (Small Singapore) due to the significant number of its residents who work and reside in Singapore, many holding Permanent Residency (PR) status.

The village is predominantly home to the Scheduled Caste (SC) community, particularly the Parayar/Adi Dravida people. Unlike common stereotypes, the Adi Dravida population in Kovilangulam is highly educated and economically prosperous. Many families have achieved substantial financial success through their overseas employment, particularly in Singapore, leading to improved living standards, modern infrastructure, and high levels of education among the younger generations.

The influence of Singapore can be seen in the village's development, lifestyle, and global outlook, making Kovilangulam a unique and progressive rural community in Tamil Nadu..

== Climate ==
Climate data for Kovilangulam (1991–2020)
Month	Jan	Feb	Mar	Apr	May	Jun	Jul	Aug	Sep	Oct	Nov	Dec	Year
Record high °C (°F)	34.5 (94.1)	38.0 (100.4)	39.5 (103.1)	42.0 (107.6)	42.8 (109.0)	43.0 (109.4)	41.5 (106.7)	40.0 (104.0)	39.4 (102.9)	39.0 (102.2)	39.8 (103.6)	34.5 (94.1)	43.0 (109.4)
Mean daily maximum °C (°F)	31.9 (89.4)	34.0 (93.2)	36.2 (97.2)	37.7 (99.9)	38.1 (100.6)	38.2 (100.8)	37.4 (99.3)	36.9 (98.4)	35.5 (95.9)	34.3 (93.7)	31.3 (88.3)	30.8 (87.4)	35.3 (95.5)
Mean daily minimum °C (°F)	20.1 (68.2)	20.0 (68.0)	23.6 (74.5)	24.9 (76.8)	25.6 (78.1)	25.4 (77.7)	25.2 (77.4)	24.5 (76.1)	23.9 (75.0)	23.2 (73.8)	22.3 (72.1)	20.2 (68.4)	23.3 (73.9)
Record low °C (°F)	14.6 (58.3)	16.6 (61.9)	19.7 (67.5)	21.0 (69.8)	21.6 (70.9)	23.0 (73.4)	20.0 (68.0)	22.0 (71.6)	20.8 (69.4)	19.8 (67.6)	18.8 (65.8)	14.8 (58.6)	14.6 (58.3)
Source: India Meteorological Department

== Demographics ==
According to the 2011 Census of India, Kovilangulam had a population of 3,569 and a total area of 11.73 km^{2}. Males and females constituted 48.95 per cent and 51.05 per cent respectively of the population. Literacy at that time was 75 per cent. People classified as Scheduled Castes under India's system of positive discrimination accounted for 35.78 per cent of the population.
