= R. Chokkar =

Indian politician

R. Chokkar is an Indian politician and was a Member of the Legislative Assembly. He was elected to the Tamil Nadu legislative assembly as an Indian National Congress (INC) candidate from Virudhunagar constituency in the 1989 election and as a Tamil Maanila Congress (Moopanar) (TMC) candidate from Sivakasi constituency in 1996.

Chokkar resigned from his seat in the Assembly on 1 June 2000. His son, Sreeraja Chokkar, was nominated as the INC candidate to contest the Sivakasi seat in the 2016 state assembly elections.
