= R. Gnanadoss =

Indian politician

R. Gnanadoss is an Indian politician and presently serving Member of the Legislative Assembly. He was elected to the Tamil Nadu Legislative Assembly as a Marumalarchi Dravida Munnetra Kazhagam candidate from Sivakasi constituency in 2006.
