= A. R. R. Seenivasan =

Indian politician

A. R. R. Seenivasan was an Indian politician and Member of the Legislative Assembly. He was elected to the Tamil Nadu Legislative Assembly as a Dravida Munnetra Kazhagam candidate from Virudhunagar constituency in 1996, 2016, 2021 election.
