= Sivakasi =

City in Tamil Nadu, India

Sivakasi "Little Japan of India"
- City
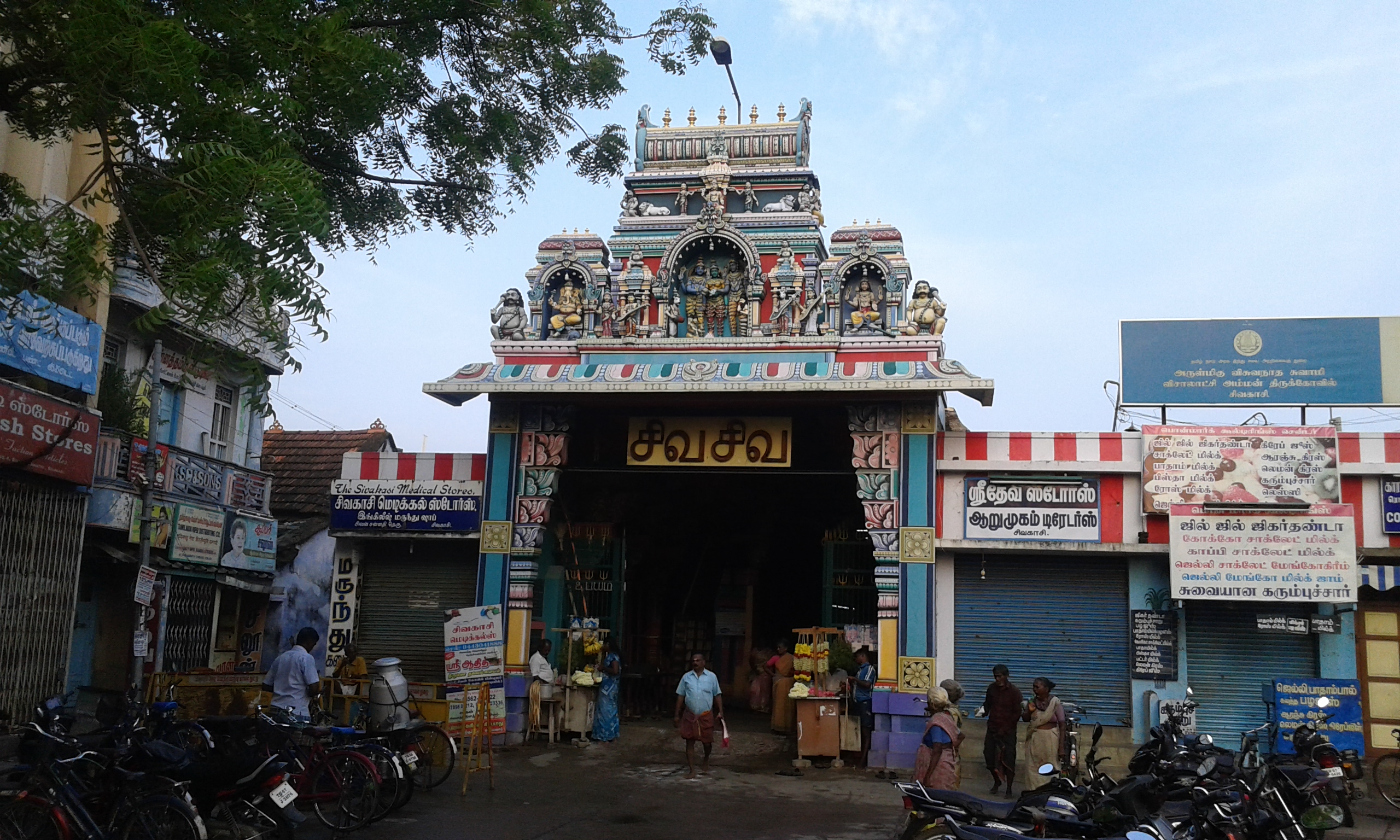
- Kasi Viswanathar temple in Sivakasi, after which the city is named
- Nicknames: Little Japan of India, Cracker City of India
- Sivakasi, Tamil Nadu Sivakasi (India)
- Coordinates: 9.453300°N 77.802400°E
- Country: India
- State: Tamil Nadu
- District: Virudhunagar
- Revenue Division: Sivakasi
- Taluk: Sivakasi
- Named for: The deity Shiva and the city Kashi (Varanasi)

Government
  - Type: Municipal Corporation
  - Body: Sivakasi Corporation

Area
  - Total: 19.89 km^{2} (7.68 sq mi)
- Elevation: 127 m (417 ft)

Population (2011)
  - Total: 260,047
  - Density: 13,070/km^{2} (33,860/sq mi)
- Demonym: Sivakasian Sivakasikaran

Languages
  - Official: Tamil
- Time zone: UTC+5:30 (IST)
- PIN: 626123, 626124, 626189, 626130
- Telephone code: 04562
- Vehicle registration: TN 67, TN 84, TN 95
- Website: virudhunagar.nic.in

Sivakasi (also pronounced Shivakaashi) is a city in Virudhunagar District in the Indian state of Tamil Nadu. The city is known for firecrackers and match factories that produce 70% of the country's output. The printing industries in Sivakasi produce 30% of the total diaries produced in India. The industries in Sivakasi employ over 25,000 people and the estimated turnover of the firecracker, match making and printing industries in the city is around ₹20 billion (US$210 million). It is the largest city in Virudhunagar district.

Sivakasi was established in the 15th century during the reign of the Pandya king Harikesari Parakkirama Pandian. The city was a part of Madurai and has been ruled at various times by Later Pandyas, the Vijayanagar Empire, Madurai Nayaks, Chanda Sahib, the Carnatic kingdom and the British. A major riot against the British Raj took place in Sivakasi in 1899.

Sivakasi has a dry climate, making it suitable for dry crops like cotton, chilies and millets. Badhrkali Amman Temple is the most prominent landmark of Sivakasi, and the temple festivals constitute the major festivals of the city. AJ and Hatsun Indoor Stadium has a coaching centre for badminton and is the major sporting venue of the city. Sivakasi is a part of Sivakasi constituency and elects its member of legislative assembly every five years, and a part of the Virudhunagar constituency that elects its member of parliament. Sivakasi is locally administered by a municipal corporation which covers an area of 6.8 km^{2} (2.6 sq mi). Roadways are the major mode of transport, in addition to a railway which runs through the city. As of 2021, Sivakasi has an estimated population of 160,047.

== History ==
Sivakasi was established during the early 15th century CE. Between 1428 and 1460, it was ruled by the Pandya king Harikesari Parakkirama Pandian as part of the southern Madurai region (constituting modern Sivakasi and its surroundings). Hindu legend relates that he wanted to construct a temple for the Hindu god Shiva at Tenkasi and went to Kasi to bring a lingam (an iconic representation of Shiva). While returning to his palace with the prized lingam, he rested under the grove of a vilva tree, the favourite tree of Shiva. When a cow carrying the lingam refused to move from the spot, the king realised that the wishes of Shiva were different from his own, and he placed the lingam in the place where the cow halted. The place where the "Shiva lingam brought from Kasi" was installed came to be known as Sivakasi.

Madurai became independent from the Vijayanagar Empire in 1559 under the Nayaks. Nayak rule ended in 1736 and Madurai was repeatedly captured several times by Chanda Sahib (1740–1754), Arcot Nawab and Muhammed Yusuf Khan (1725–1764) during the mid-18th century. In 1801, Madurai came under the direct control of the British East India Company and was annexed to the Madras Presidency.

The mutual confrontation between the Maravars and Nadars reached its peak in 1899, leading to a series of riots which became known as the Sivakasi riots. A total of 22 people were killed, as many as 800 houses and the Big Chariot in the centre of the city (used by the temple during festivals) were burnt during the riots. Eventually, the riots ended after the intervention of the British Indian Army in mid-July 1899.

The Sivakasi municipality was established in 1920. After India gained independence from the British in 1947, Sivakasi continued to be a municipality under the Madras state and later a part of Tamil Nadu, when the state was split on linguistic lines during 1953, 1956 and 1960 and renamed in 1968. It was promoted to a second-grade municipality in 1978, first-grade in 1978, selection-grade in 1998, special-grade in 2013 and proposed to be upgraded as municipal corporation in 2017. On 31 December 2020, both Sivakasi and Thiruthangal are merged with a view to promote Sivakasi as municipal corporation. It is declared as Municipal Corporation on 24 August 2021 in Tamil Nadu legislative assembly. (Note: The municipalities in Tamil Nadu are graded special, selection, grade I and grade II based on income and population.)

In the decades following independence, Sivakasi grew as an industrial city specialising in the firecracker, match and printing industries. Several incidents of fire and explosions have occurred in the fireworks factories.

== Geography ==
Sivakasi is located at 9.45°N 77.8167°E and has an average elevation of 101 metres (331 feet). The municipality covers an area of 6.8 km^{2} (6,800,000 m^{2}). The city is located in Virudhunagar district of the South Indian state, Tamil Nadu, at a distance of 74 km (46 mi) from Madurai. Sivakasi is located to the east of the Western Ghats and to the west of Sattur. The topography is mostly flat, with no major geological formation. There are no notable mineral resources available around the city. Cotton, chilies, and millets are major crops in the area due to the prevalence of black and red soil types and poor groundwater supply.

Sivakasi experiences a hot and dry climate year-round. The temperature ranges from a maximum of 39 °C (102 °F) to a minimum of 23 °C (73 °F). Like the rest of Tamil Nadu, April to June are the hottest months and December to January are the coldest. Rainfall is low, with an average of 812 mm (32.0 in) annually, which is lower than the state average of 1,008 mm (39.7 in). The Southwest monsoon, with an onset in June and lasting up to August, brings scanty rainfall. The bulk of the rainfall is received during the North East monsoon in the months of October, November and December. The average humidity of the city is 76.2% and varies between 65.6% to 79.2%.

== Demographics ==
Religious census
Religion	Percent(%)
Hindu	85.42%
Muslim	9.21%
Christian	5.20%
Other	0.17%

Historical population
Year	Pop.	±%
1951	22,674	—
1961	30,690	+35.4%
1971	44,883	+46.2%
1981	59,827	+33.3%
1991	65,593	+9.6%
2001	72,168	+10.0%
2011	71,040	−1.6%
Sources: 1961 – 1981; 1991 - 2011

According to the 2011 census, Sivakasi had a population of 71,040 with a sex ratio of 1,009 females for every 1,000 males, much above the national average of 929. A total of 6,963 were under the age of six, constituting 3,474 males and 3,489 females. Scheduled Castes and Scheduled Tribes accounted for 8.35% and 0.25% of the population, respectively. The average literacy of the city was 79.62%, compared to the national average of 72.99%. The city had a total of 18,952 households. There were a total of 29,342 workers, comprising 22 cultivators, 135 main agricultural labourers, 955 in household industries, 27,662 other workers, 568 marginal workers, 6 marginal cultivators, 3 marginal agricultural labourers, 79 marginal workers in household industries and 480 other marginal workers.

In 2011, Sivakasi had 85.42% Hindus, 9.21% Muslims, 5% Christians, 0.01% Sikhs, 0.06% Jains, 0.08% following other religions and 0.01% following no religion or did not indicate any religious preference.

In 2001, 16 slums were identified in the city, with a total population of 34,029 people. The slum population increased from 42% to 47% of the city population during the period of 1991–2001. The high decadal growth of population during the 1961–71 period is attributed to the high level of industrialisation during the period. The density of population increased from 9,646 persons per km^{2} in 1991 to 10,613 persons per km^{2} in 2001. The wards along the Virudhunagar, Sattur, Srivilliputhur and Vembakottai corridors have registered increased commercial and residential activity.

The majority of Sivakasi residents are engaged in the secondary sector involving match works, fireworks, and the printing industry. During the 2001 census, the occupational pattern indicated the increasing presence of the tertiary sector. The agricultural output of the city is limited, due to the lack of favourable geographical and climatic conditions.

== Municipal administration and politics ==
Municipality officials
Mayor	I Sangeetha
Deputy Mayor	Vignesh Priya
Commissioner	S. Murugan
Elected members
Member of Legislative Assembly	S. Keerthana
Member of Parliament	Manicka Tagore

The Sivakasi municipality has 33 wards and there is an elected councillor for each of those wards. The functions of the municipality are devolved into six departments: general administration/personnel, Engineering, Revenue, Public Health, city planning and Information Technology (IT). All these departments are under the control of a Municipal Commissioner who is the executive head. The legislative powers are vested in a body of 33 members, one each from the 33 wards. The legislative body is headed by an elected Chairperson assisted by a Deputy Chairperson. On 24 August 2021, the government announced the upgrading of Sivakasi city to Sivakasi City Municipal Corporation.

Sivakasi comes under the Sivakasi assembly constituency and it elects a member to the Tamil Nadu Legislative Assembly once every five years. From the 1977 elections, All India Anna Dravid Munnetra Kazhagam (AIADMK) won the assembly seat five times (in 1980, 1984,1991,2011 and 2016 elections); Tamil Maanila Congress (TMC) twice (1996, 2001). The seat was won once by Dravida Munnetra Kazhagam (DMK, 1989), Janata Party (1977), Marumalarchi Dravida Munnetra Kazhagam (MDMK, 2006) and Indian National Congress (2021). The current MLA of the constituency is S. Keerthana from Tamilaga Vettri Kazhagam.

During the 1957 elections, Sivakasi was a part of Srivilliputhur constituency and was held by the Indian National Congress and an independent after the by-elections. During the 1962 elections, the city was a part of Aruppukkottai constituency and was held by the Forward Block party. Since 1967, the city has been a part of Virudhunagar Lok Sabha constituency; the constituency was won by AIADMK five times (1980, 1984, 1989, 1991, and 2014), MDMK three times (1998, 1999, and 2004), and once each by Swathanthara Party (1967), DMK (1971), INC (1977), and Communist Party of India (CPI, 1996). The current Member of Parliament from the constituency is Manicka Tagore from the Indian National Congress.

Law and order in the city are maintained by the Sivakasi subdivision of the Tamil Nadu Police headed by a Deputy Superintendent. There are three police stations in the city, one of them being an all-women police station. There are special units like prohibition enforcement, district crime, social justice and human rights, district crime records and special branch that operate at the district level police division headed by a Superintendent of Police.

== Education and utility services ==
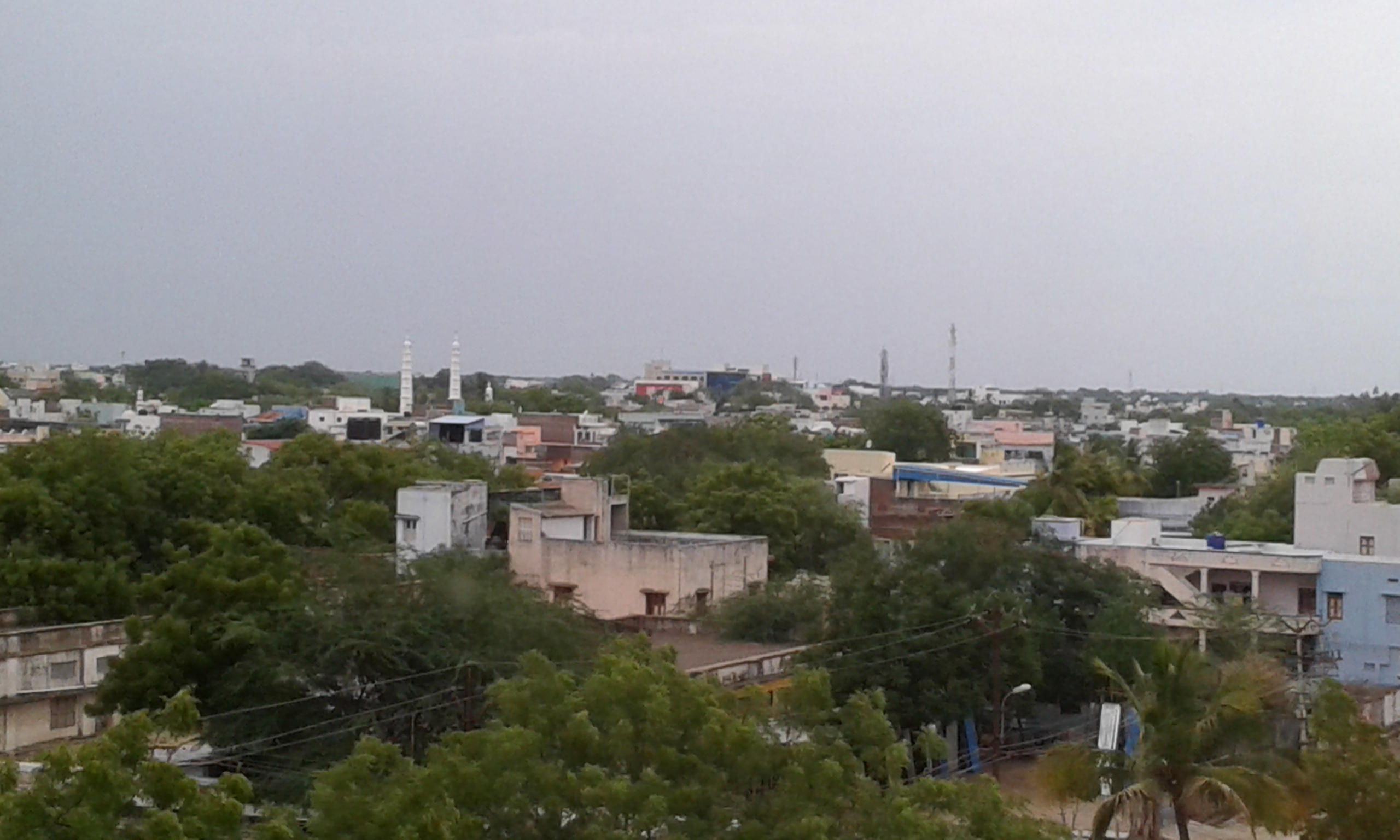
View of the city

There are five government schools in Sivakasi: two primary schools, one middle school, one high school and one higher secondary school. There are ten private schools in the city. There are four engineering colleges in the city, with the Mepco Schlenk Engineering College being prominent among them. There are four arts and science colleges and three polytechnic colleges in the city. Sri Kaliswari College is located within the city.

In 2011, there was one government hospital, three municipal health centres, one municipal maternity home and 25 private hospitals and clinics that take care of the healthcare needs of the citizens. The municipality operates two markets, namely the Anna Daily Market and Viswanatham Municipal Meat Market that cater to the needs of the city and the rural areas around it.

Electricity supply to Sivakasi is regulated and distributed by the Tamil Nadu Electricity Board (TNEB). The city along with its suburbs forms the Sivakasi Electricity Distribution Circle. A Chief Distribution engineer is stationed at the regional headquarters. The municipality covers an area of 6.8 km^{2} (6,800,000 m^{2}). In 2011, the municipality maintained a total of 2,584 street lamps: 322 sodium lamps, 125 mercury vapour lamps, 2,136 tube lights and one high mast beam lamp.

Water supply is provided by the Sivakasi Municipality from the Vaippar river through eight reservoirs and six feeders located in various parts of the city. In the period 2000–2001, a total of 6.5 million litres of water was supplied every day for households in the city. As per the municipal data for 2011, about 45 metric tonnes of solid waste were collected from Sivakasi every day by door-to-door collection and subsequently the source segregation and dumping was carried out by the sanitary department of the Sivakasi municipality. The coverage of solid waste management in the city by the municipality had an efficiency of 100% in 2001. There is no underground drainage system in the city and the sewerage system for disposal of sullage is through septic tanks, open drains and public conveniences. The municipality maintained a total of 85.87 km (53.36 mi) of storm water drains in 2011.

== Economy ==
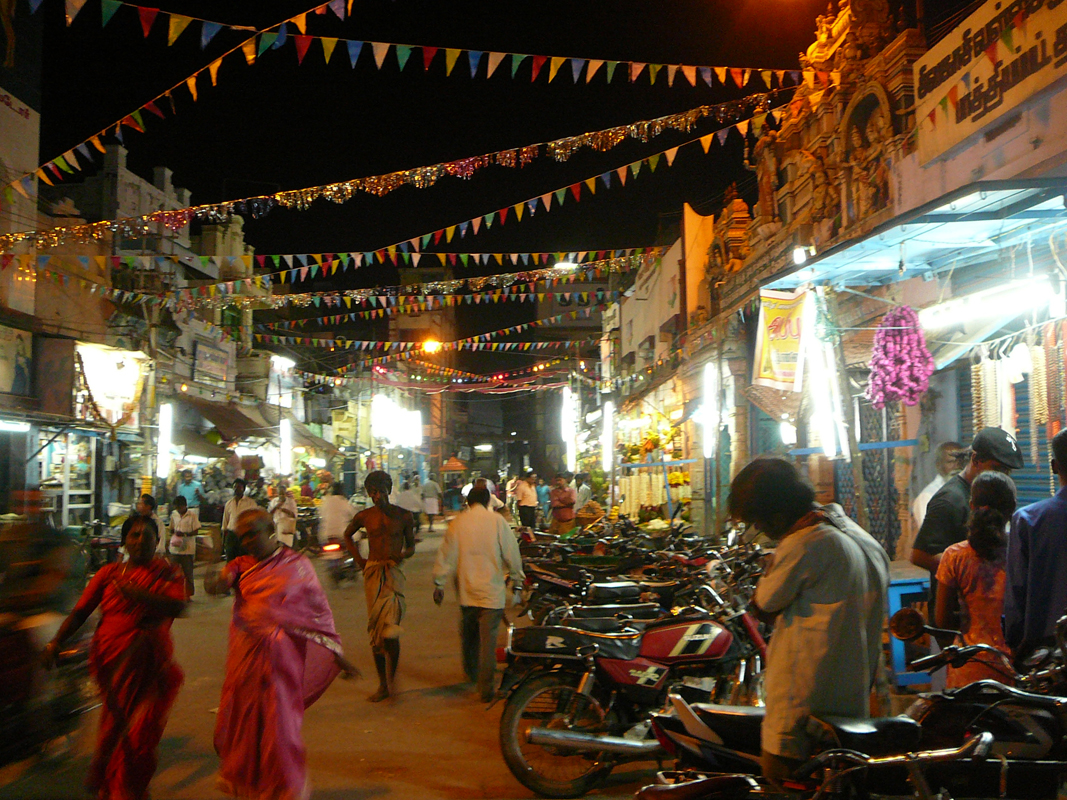
Busy street in Sivakasi

The economy of Sivakasi is dependent on three major industries: firecrackers, matchbox manufacturing, and printing. The city has 520 registered printing industries, 53 match factories, 32 chemical factories, seven soda factories, four flour mills and two rice and oil mills. The city is the nodal centre for firecracker manufacturing at the national level. In 2020, there were around 1070 registered firecracker manufacturing companies in Sivakasi and 800,000 directly and indirectly employed by the industry. Some of the private enterprises had an annual turnover of ₹5 billion (US$52 million). In 2011, the combined estimated turnover of the firecracker, matchbox making and printing industry in the city was around ₹20 billion (US$210 million). Approximately 70% of the firecrackers and matches produced in India are from Sivakasi. The hot and dry climate of the city is conducive to the firecracker and matchbox making industries. The raw materials for these industries were procured from Sattur earlier but were discontinued due to high power and production costs. Raw materials are sourced from Kerala and Andaman. The paper for the printing industry is procured from various states. The city is a major producer of diaries, contributing to 30% of the total diaries produced in India. Printing industry in the city was initially utilized for printing labels for the firecrackers and later evolved with modern machinery to grow as a printing hub. In 2012, all the industries suffered 15–20% production loss due to power shortage and escalating labor cost.

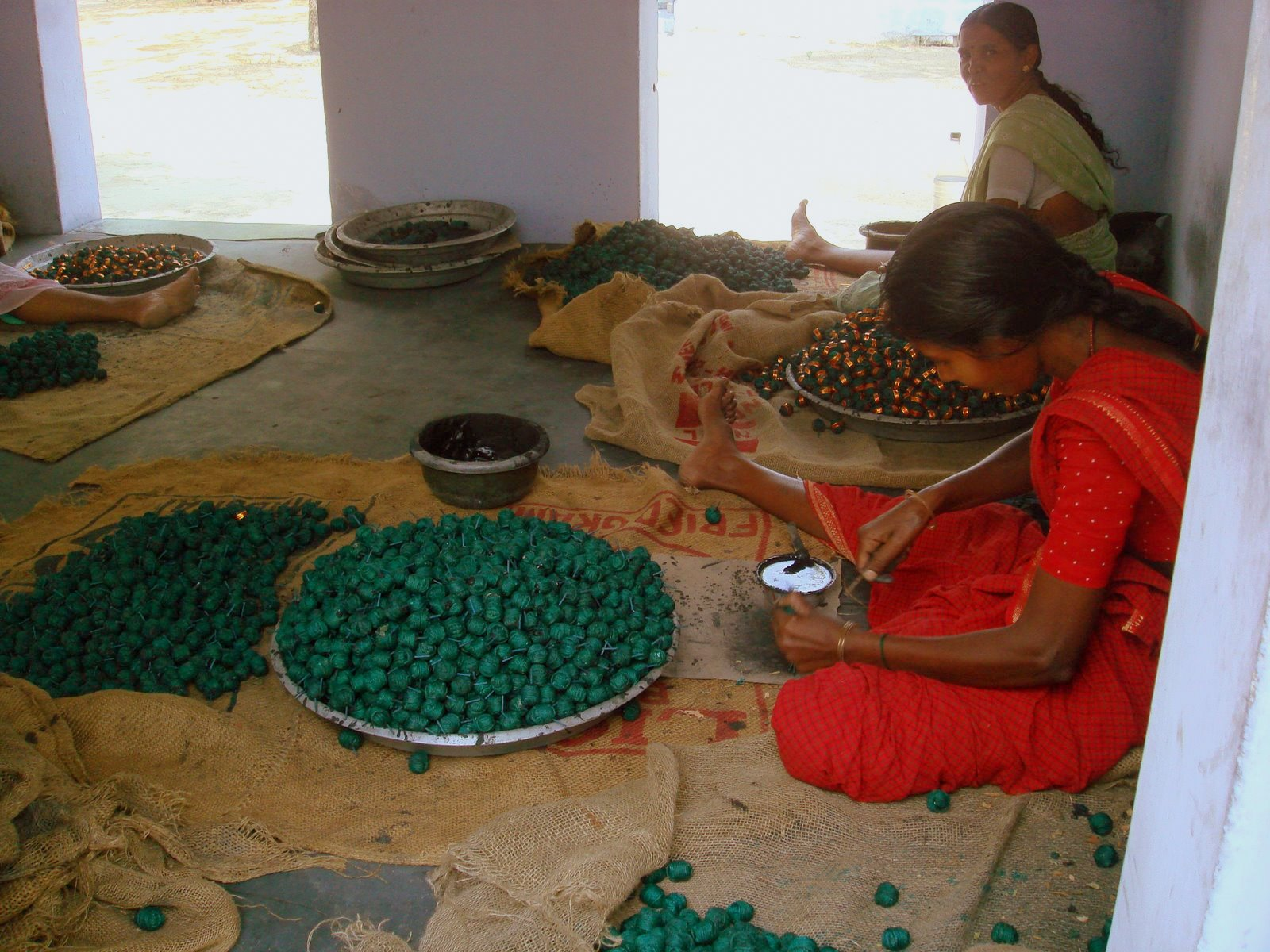
Sutli Bomb class Firecrackers being made

The major issues in the fireworks industry in Sivakasi is child labour and frequent accidents. In a blast in 1991 in a factory, 39 people were killed and 65 others were injured. In July 2009, more than 40 people were killed in a fire accident in a firecracker unit. The police traced out unregistered units and irregularities that led to the accident. In a fire accident in August 2011, seven people were killed and five were seriously injured. A similar fire accident and blast in a private unit in September 2012 killed 40 people and injured 38 others. The common reasons cited for the accidents are inadequate training of workers and supervisors involved in different stages of production and marketing of firecracker items. Other reasons are found to be overstocking of explosives, raw material and finished goods, and employment of workers in excess of the permitted strength.

Child labour in the industries, especially in matchbox making factories, was at its peak during the 1970s and 1980s. In 1981, the child workforce in the age group 4–16 was 30% of the total workforce, 90% of whom were girls. In 1986, the National Child Labour project estimated child labour in Sivakasi matchbox making industries to be 14,121 children. The estimates indicated 80% of the child labour belonging to Scheduled Castes (SC), who were marginalised for centuries for cheap labour. Poverty and lack of farm produce were stated as the main reason for child labour. The employers also preferred children because of ease of management, discipline, and lack of labour unions. The children in these industries suffered from a backache, neckache, tuberculosis, malnutrition, gastrointestinal disorders, dermatitis, respiratory disorders, over-exhaustion, burn injuries and water-borne diseases due to exposure to harmful chemicals in the work environment. The situation of the child labour came to light during an accident of a bus transporting the children in 1976. The central government appointed a one-man committee under Harbans Singh in 1978, who reported abolishing child labour would seriously impact the economy of the region. The National Policy on child labour was formulated by the central government in August 1987, aiming at the rehabilitation of children withdrawn from these factories. In 1988, the union labour ministry initiated a programme for providing informal education, free healthcare and free lunch for children working in the factories. The Supreme Court of India, in a judgement, ruled in December 1996 indicating provisions for preventing child labour like compensation for the child employed, employment to the adult members of the family and contribution to the corpus fund by the state government. From the establishment of child labour Act in 1986 till 2011, 150,000 inspections on child labour have been conducted in the factories, 1,500 cases have been registered and few prosecutions have been made. The results indicated a small amount of child labour in the cottage and household industries.

== Transportation ==
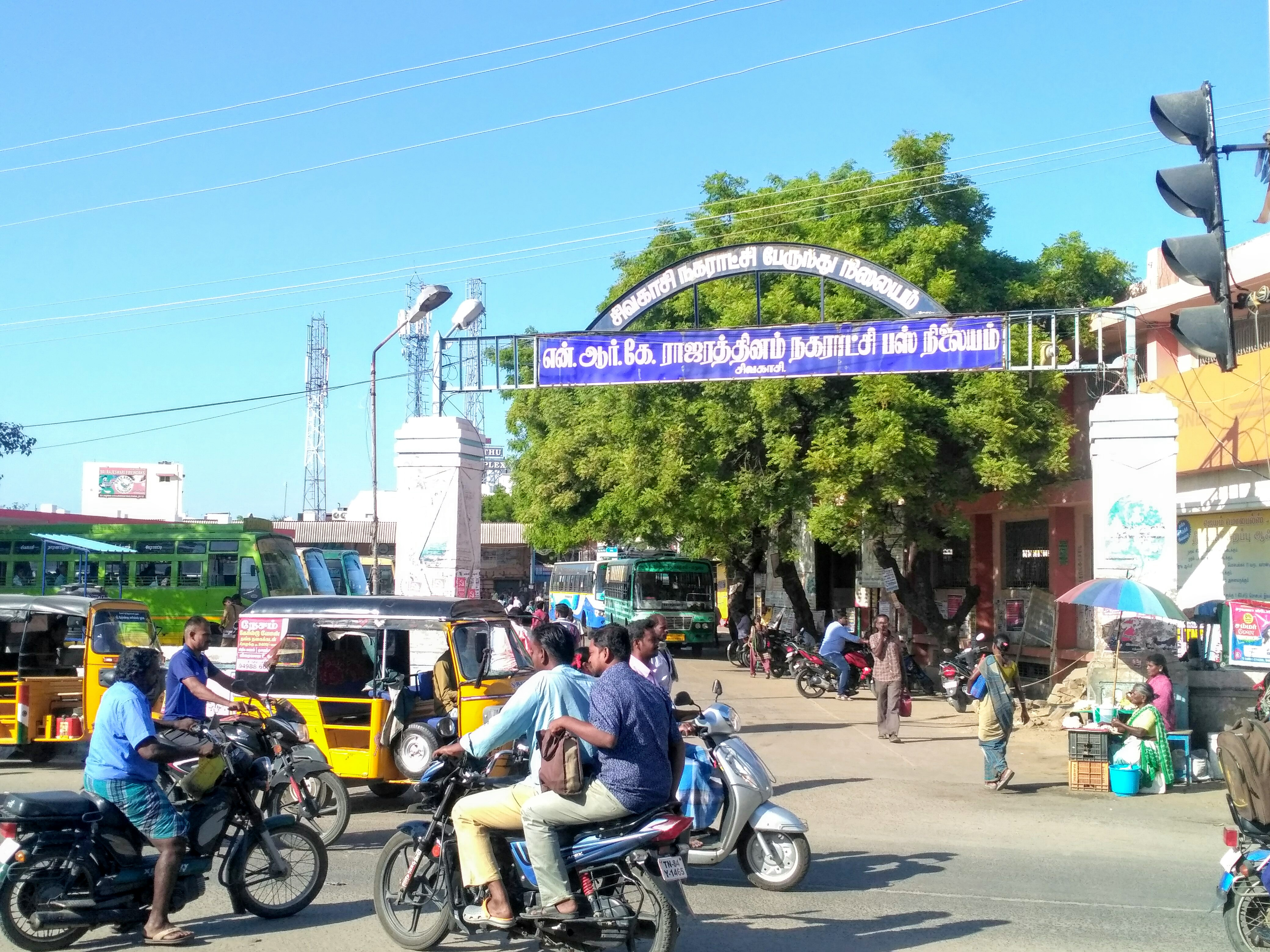
Sivakasi Bus Stand

The Sivakasi municipality maintains 65.15 km (40.48 mi) of the road. The city has 13.04 km (8.10 mi) of concrete road and 52.12 km (32.39 mi) of bituminous road. A total of 2.5 km (1.6 mi) of state highways is maintained by the State Highways Department. Four major roads connect the city with Sattur, Virudhunagar, Srivilliputhur and Vembakottai; The first phase of Outer Ring Road is also under construction. There are eight major intersections located across different parts in these major roads.

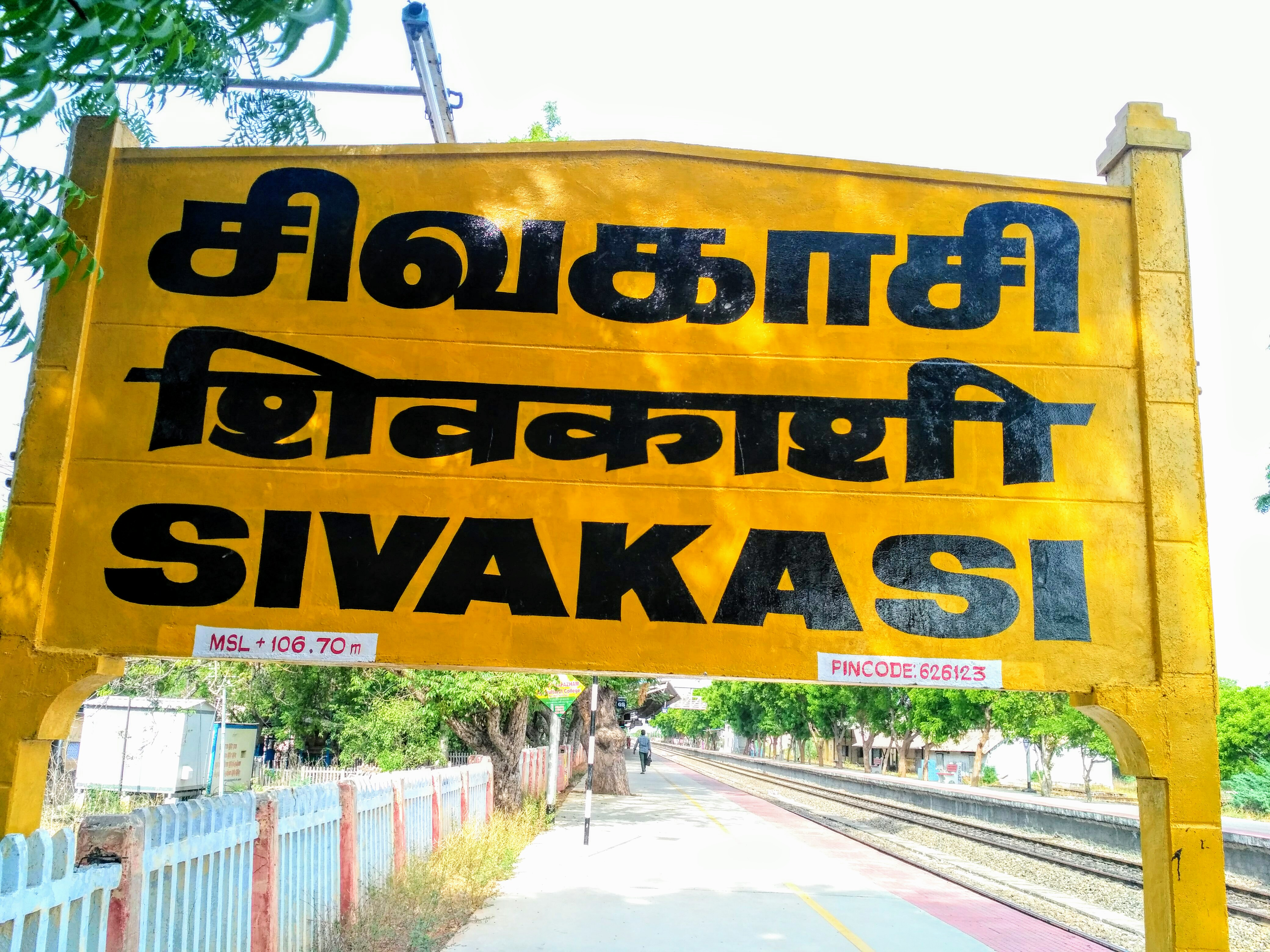
Sivakasi Railway Station

Sivakasi is served by a city bus service, which provides connectivity within the city and the suburbs. Minibus service operated by private companies cater to the local transport needs. The city bus routes to surrounding villages are to Puliparaipatti, Thayilpatti, Madathupatti Vilampatti, Alangulam, Vilampatti, Alangulam, M.Pudupatti, Alamarathupatti, Sengamalapatti, Muthalipatti, and Meenampatti. The main bus stand covers an area of 1.39 acres (5,600 m^{2}) and is located in the heart of the city. The Tamil Nadu State Transport Corporation operates daily services connecting various cities to Sivakasi. The State Express Transport Corporation operates long-distance buses connecting the city to important cities like Chennai, Bangalore, Tiruppur and Thoothukudi. The major intercity bus routes are to Madurai, Chennai, Erode, Karur, Coimbatore, Karaikudi, Dindigul, Trichy, Ramanathapuram, Thanjavur, Sankarankovil, Sengottai, Rajapalayam, Tenkasi, Kovilpatti, Tiruppur, Dharapuram, Oddanchatram, Thoothukudi, Tiruchendur, Nagercoil and Tirunelveli. Being an industrial city, there is significant truck activity with around 400–450 trucks entering the city for loading and unloading activities daily. Three wheelers, called autos are also a common public transport system.

Sivakasi railway station is located in the rail head from Madurai to Sengottai. It connects Tamil Nadu with Kerala through Rajapalayam and Sengottai. The Podhigai Express connects Sivakasi to Sengottai and Chennai Egmore in either directions. All other express trains ply from Virudunagar station. There are also passenger trains running either direction from Madurai to Shencottah. There is another railway station at Thiruthangal, which caters to the locality of Thiruthangal, where passenger trains, Podhigai Express and Silambu Express stops.

The closest international airport is Madurai international Airport, which is located 70 km away.

== Culture ==
Arulmigu Viswanatha Swamy Temple is an important ancient temple in Sivakasi built by Pandya King Arikesari Parakkirama Pandian between 1428 and 1460 during his reign.

Badhrakali Amman temple is another prominent temple of Sivakasi. The tower or Rajagopuram of this temple has a breadth of 66 ft (20 m), a width of 44 ft (13 m) and a height of 110 ft (34 m). "Panguni Pongal" and "Chithirai Pongal" are the annual festivals celebrated for the deities Mariamman and Badrakali Amman in April and May, respectively, both of which are celebrated for ten days.

Periya Palli Vasal mosque and Chinna Palli Vasal mosque are two of the most prominent mosques in the city. The CSI Regland Memorial Church is the prominent church.

== Notable people ==
- Thondar Duraiswamy (1915–1971), Indian freedom movement comrade
- Sridevi (1963-2018), Indian actress
- Ayya Nadar (1905-1982), Indian entrepreneur

== Sports ==
AJ Indoor Stadium on Velayutham Road is a major sporting and coaching centre for badminton, table tennis, and basketball. Many district, state and national level badminton championship matches are held in this stadium.

== See also ==
- Standard Fireworks (India)
