= P. Seenivasan =

Indian politician

P. Seenivasan was an Indian politician affiliated with the Dravida Munnetra Kazhagam (DMK) and a former Member of the Tamil Nadu Legislative Assembly. He served as the Deputy Speaker of the Tamil Nadu Legislative Assembly from 1971 to 1972.

Seenivasan was elected to the Tamil Nadu Legislative Assembly as a DMK candidate from the Virudhunagar and Sivakasi constituencies in the 1967, 1971, and 1989 elections.

== Electoral performance ==
1967 Madras Legislative Assembly election: Virudhunagar
Party	Candidate	Votes	%	±%
DMK	P. Seenivasan	33,421	49.90%	New
INC	K. Kamaraj	32,136	47.98%	New
Independent	R. Periakaruppan	838	1.25%	New
Independent	K. P. Nadar	579	0.86%	New
Margin of victory		1,285	1.92%	New
Turnout		66,974	84.25%	
Registered electors		82,606		
DMK win (new seat)				
