= Virudhunagar Lok Sabha constituency =

Parliamentary constituency in Tamil Nadu, India

Coordinates: 9.6°N 78.0°E

Virudhunagar
- Lok Sabha constituency
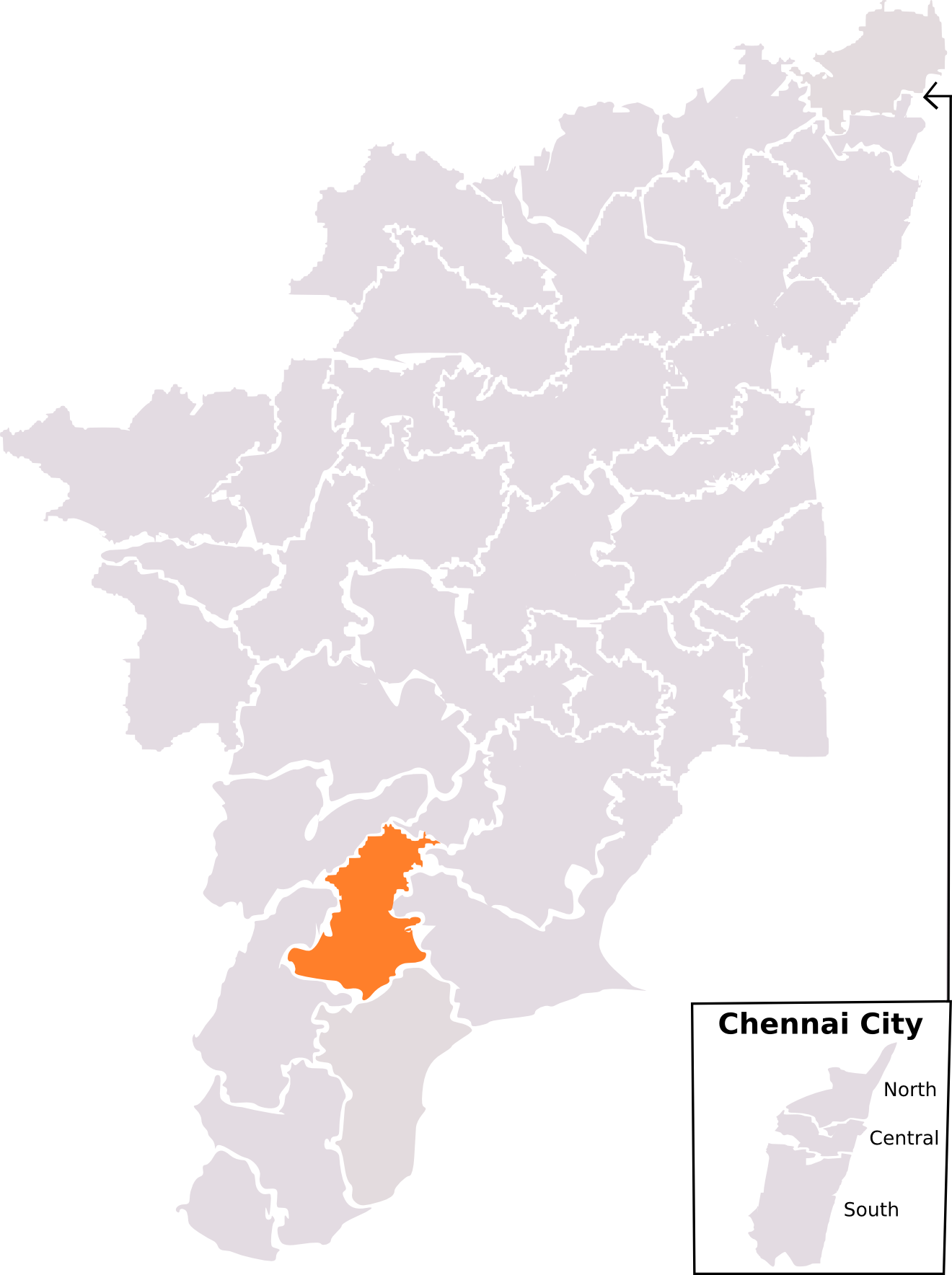
- Area of Virudhunagar Lok Sabha Constituency

Constituency details
- Country: India
- Region: South India
- State: Tamil Nadu
- Assembly constituencies: Thiruparankundram; Thirumangalam; Sattur; Sivakasi; Virudhunagar; Aruppukkottai
- Established: 2009
- Total electors: 1,501,942
- Reservation: None

Member of Parliament
- 18th Lok Sabha
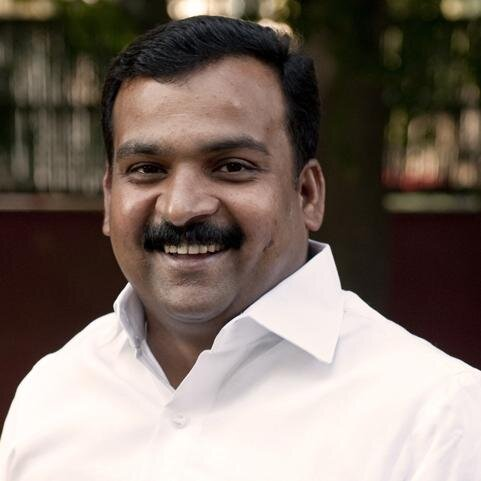
- Incumbent B. Manickam Tagore
- Party: INC
- Alliance: INDIA
- Elected year: 2024
- Preceded by: T. Radhakrishnan

Virudhunagar Lok Sabha constituency (Tamil: விருதுநகர் மக்களவைத் தொகுதி) is one of the 39 Lok Sabha (parliamentary) constituencies in Tamil Nadu, a state in southern India.

== Members of Parliament ==
Year	Member	Political party
2009	B. Manickam Tagore	Indian National Congress
2014	T. Radhakrishnan	All India Anna Dravida Munnetra Kazhagam
2019	B. Manickam Tagore	Indian National Congress
2024	B. Manickam Tagore	Indian National Congress

== Assembly segments ==
=== 2009-present ===
Constituency number	Name	Reserved for (SC/ST/None)	District	Party	2024 Lead
195.	Thiruparankundram	None	Madurai	TVK	INC
196.	Thirumangalam	None	Madurai	DMK	DMDK
204.	Sattur	None	Virudhunagar	DMK	INC
205.	Sivakasi	None	Virudhunagar	TVK	INC
206	Virudhunagar	None	Virudhunagar	TVK	INC
207	Aruppukkottai	None	Virudhunagar	DMK	DMDK

== Election results ==
Vote share of Winning candidates
2024	36.28%
2019	43.77%
2014	40.20%
2009	40.02%

=== General election 2024 ===
2024 Indian general election: Virudhunagar
Party	Candidate	Votes	%	±%
INC	B. Manickam Tagore	385,256	36.28	▼7.49
DMDK	V. Vijaya Prabhakaran	380,877	35.87	▲6.47
BJP	R. Radikaa	166,271	15.66	New
NOTA	None of the above	9,408	0.89	▼0.72
Majority		4,379	0.41	▼13.96
Turnout		1,054,634	70.22	▼2.19
INC hold		Swing	▼7.49	

=== General election 2019 ===
2019 Indian general elections: Virudhunagar
Party	Candidate	Votes	%	±%
INC	B. Manickam Tagore	470,883	43.77	▲39.97
DMDK	R. Alagarsamy	316,329	29.40	New
AMMK	S. Paramasiva Iyyappan	107,615	10.00	New
MNM	V. Muniyasamy	57,129	5.31	New
NOTA	None of the Above	17,292	1.61	▲0.40
Majority		154,554	14.37	▼0.02
Turnout		1,074,735	72.41	▼2.45
INC gain from AIADMK		Swing	▲39.97	

=== General election 2014 ===
2014 Indian general elections: Virudhunagar
Party	Candidate	Votes	%	±%
AIADMK	T. Radhakrishnan	406,694	40.20	New
MDMK	Vaiko	261,143	25.81	▼12.15
DMK	S. Rethinavelu	241,505	23.87	New
INC	B. Manickam Tagore	38,482	3.80	▼36.22
CPI	K. Samuelraj	20,157	1.99	New
NOTA	None of the Above	12,225	1.21	New
Majority		145,551	14.39	▲12.33
Turnout		1,010,930	74.86	▼2.53
AIADMK gain from INC		Swing	New	

=== General election 2009 ===
2009 Indian general elections: Virudhunagar
Party	Candidate	Votes	%	±%
INC	B. Manickam Tagore	307,187	40.02	New
MDMK	Vaiko	291,423	37.96	New
DMDK	K. Pandiarajan	125,229	16.31	New
BJP	M. Karthik	17,336	2.26	New
BSP	V. Kanagaraj	8,198	1.07	New
Majority		15,764	2.06	New
Turnout		767,653	77.39	New
INC win (new seat)				

== See also ==
- Lok Sabha
- Parliament of India
- Virudhunagar district
- List of constituencies of the Lok Sabha
