= Sivakasi riots of 1899 =

Series of Indian riots

The Sivakasi riots of 1899 were a series of communal disturbances which occurred during 6 June 1899 in Sivakasi, present-day Virudhunagar district, Tamil Nadu, India.

== Background ==
The Nadar historian Samuel Sargunar claimed that the Nadars are the descendants of the ancient rulers of Pandyan kingdom and that when Nayak rulers captured the Pandya country, they divided the country into several Palayams (divisions) and appointed Palaiyakkars as rulers. The Nayak rulers of Tamil Nadu, as per the claims of Sargunar, imposed Deshaprashtam (ostracism) on the ancient Pandyas (Nadars), to ensure that their rise wouldn't ever happen. These claims are, however, not baseless. The traditions followed by the Nelamaikkarars and the existence of the ruins beneath the Teri palmrya forests of Tiruchendur and ancient Pandyan capital city of Korkai, where the Nadar population is predominant, suggest they could very well be the heirs of the Early Pandyas. However, there is little evidence to suggest that the Nadars were the descendants of later Pandya rulers. This belief, that the Nadars had been the kings of Tamil Nadu, became the dogma of the Nadar community in the 19th century. The Nadars were a community mostly engaged in the palmyra industry, including the production of toddy and were therefore considered lower than other middle castes, but relatively much higher than the low castes in the 19th century. A small endogamous group of aristocratic Nadars, known as Nelamaikkarars, were wealthy landlords. Due to their association with toddy, the Nadars were not allowed enter temples built by castes above them.

Some Nadar traders migrated to northern Tirunelveli and Virudhunagar to settle down in these regions. In course of time, these Nadars (Northern Nadars) became commercially skilled and therefore became upwardly mobile in the late 19th century. Mercantilism played crucial roles in facilitating their upward mobility. As the wealth of the Northern Nadars increased, they gradually began to adopt the customs of the North Indian Kshtriyas in order to improve their social status as well. This process is known as Sanskritisation. They also tried to disassociate themselves from their Nadar climber counterparts and some began to adopt the title 'Nadan', a title which was before only used by the aristocratic Nelamaikkarars. To punctuate their wealthy and powerful position in the society, the Nadars of Sivakasi hired Maravars as their palanquin bearers. The upward mobility and Kshatriya pretensions of the Nadars of Six towns of Ramanad caused resentment among, castes above them, the Vellalars and especially the Maravars, the military caste just above the Nadars. Part of this change in the Nadar community resulted in some of them converting to Christianity, both Catholicism and Protestantism. However, a majority of almost 90% remained Hindus.

== Riots ==
At the end of 1895, the Nadars of Sivakasi submitted a petition to the President of the Devasthanam so that a Nadar can get a footing in the management of a local Siva temple. The petition was declined by the committee. In the following years, a series of confrontations brought the Nadars against almost all the communities of Sivakasi. On 26 April 1899, a riot broke out in Sivakasi and the Maravar portion of the town was left almost completely destroyed. This event served as a precursor to the infamous Sivakasi riots. On 6 June 1899, a group of 5,000 Maravars gathered into a mob from all parts of the surrounding villages and towns. During the night before the attack, the Nadars felled trees onto the roads which led to the town and constructed barricades leaving a few places open to draw the attackers together. The Maravars were opposed by about 1500 Nadars. The attack lasted for nearly two hours. The Maravars were sent into retreat, carrying their dead in the dozen carts brought to haul away the loot. Eight hundred and eighty-six Nadar houses were burnt. A total of 21 people were known dead. The Maravar retaliated by attacking the Nadars scattered around Sivakasi leaving 3 Nadars dead. Eventually, the riots came to an end after the intervention of the British military in mid-July 1899.
