= Manickam Tagore =

Member of the Parliament of India

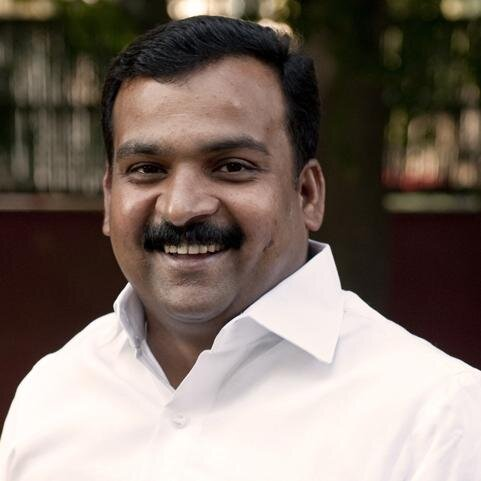

President Tamil Nadu Pradesh Congress Committee
- Incumbent
- Assumed office 29 June 2026
- National President: Mallikarjun Kharge
- Preceded by: K. Selvaperunthagai

Member of Parliament, Lok Sabha
- Incumbent
- Assumed office 18 June 2019
- Leader of the House: Narendra Modi
- Preceded by: T. Radhakrishnan
- Constituency: Virudhunagar
- In office 1 June 2009 – 18 May 2014
- Leader of the House: Pranab Mukherjee; Sushilkumar Shinde
- Preceded by: Position Established
- Succeeded by: T. Radhakrishnan
- Constituency: Virudhunagar

Chairperson – Madurai Airport Advisory Committee
- Incumbent
- Assumed office 18 June 2019
- Preceded by: T. Radhakrishnan
- In office 1 June 2009 – 18 May 2014
- Preceded by: N. S. V. Chitthan
- Succeeded by: T. Radhakrishnan

AICC Incharge for Andhra Pradesh Congress Committee & Andaman and Nicobar Territorial Congress Committee
- In office 24 December 2023 – 5 September 2026
- Preceded by: AP - Oommen Chandy

Member, AICC Screening Committee for Delhi Municipal Elections
- In office 2016–2017

Member, AICC Screen Committee for Lok Sabha Elections in West Bengal, Bihar and Assam
- In office 2014–2016

Personal details
- Born: 1 June 1975 (age 51) Sivaganga, Tamil Nadu, India
- Party: Indian National Congress
- Spouse: Subhasini Manickam (m. 2004)
- Children: 2
- Occupation: Politician

Manickam Tagore is an Indian politician and current President of Tamil Nadu Congress Committee and Member of the Parliament of India, representing Virudhunagar, Tamil Nadu. He is a Whip of Congress Party in Lok Sabha.

He earlier represented the constituency in the 15th Lok Sabha from 2009 to 2014. He is a member of the Indian National Congress party.

== Positions held ==
Year	Positions
1994	District General Secretary, NSUI
1995	Member, State NSUI
1996	General Secretary, NSUI, Tamil Nadu
1997	General Secretary, All India NSUI
1999	Vice President, All India NSUI
2003 and 2005	General Secretary, Indian Youth Congress
2006	Chairman, Central Election Authority
2008	Election Commissioner, Indian Youth Congress
2009	Elected to 15th Lok Sabha
2009	Member, Standing Committee on Finance
2009	Member, National Board on Micro and Medium Enterprises
2009	Member, Consultative Committee on Civil Aviation
2013	Member, AICC Screening Committee for Chhattisgarh Assembly Election
2014	Member, AICC Screen Committee for Lok Sabha Elections in West Bengal, Bihar and Assam
2014	Member, Screening Committee for Haryana Assembly Election
2016	Member, AICC Screening Committee for Delhi Municipal Elections
2017–2020	AICC Secretary, In charge to Karnataka
2019	Re-elected to 17th Lok Sabha (2nd term)
2019	Whip of Congress MPs in Lok Sabha
2019	Member, Parliamentary Standing Committee on Personal, Law & Justice
2019	Member, House Committee, Lok Sabha
2019	Member, Committee on Subordinate Legislation, Lok Sabha
2019	Member, Consultative Committee on Civil Aviation
2020– 4 January 2023	AICC Incharge for Telangana Congress
2020–Present	Permanent Invitee, Congress Working Committee
2024–Present	Re-elected to 18th Lok Sabha (3rd term)
2024–Present	Whip of Congress MPs in Lok Sabha
2026-Present	President of Tamil Nadu Congress Committee

== Electoral career ==
=== Lok Sabha Elections Contested ===
Elections	Constituency	Party	Result	Vote percentage	Opposition Candidate	Opposition Party	Opposition vote percentage
2009 Indian general election	Virudhunagar	INC	Won	40.02	Vaiko	MDMK	37.96
2014 Indian general election	Virudhunagar	INC	Lost	3.80	T. Radhakrishnan	ADMK	40.20
2019 Indian general election	Virudhunagar	INC	Won	43.77	R. Alagarsamy	DMDK	29.40
2024 Indian general election	Virudhunagar	INC	Won	36.28	V. Vijaya Prabhakaran	DMDK	35.87
