= List of villages in Virudhunagar district =

There are around 450 villages in the Virudhunagar district of Tamil Nadu state, south India. They are divided into 11 blocks as below.

== Aruppukottai Block ==
- Amanakkunattnam
- Koppuchithampatti
- Kovilangulam
- Kullursandhai
- Kurundhamadam
- Palavanatham
- வெள்ளையாபுரம்
- திருவிருந்தாள்புரம்
- மீனாட்சிபுரம்

== Kariapatti Block ==
- Kurandi
- Mangulam
- Melathulukkankulam
- Varalotti

== Narikudi Block ==
- Alagapuri
- Alathur
- Anaikulam
- Iluppaiyur
- Isali
- Manur
- Thimmapuram
- Veeracholan
- T.Velangudi

== Rajapalayam ==
- Chatrapatti
- Dhalavaipuram
- Ganapathi Sundara Natchiyar Puram
- Kilavikulam
- Krishnapuram
- Duraisamypuram
- Cholapuram
- Sundaranachiapuram
- Seithur
- Watrap
- Malli
- Meenampatti

== Sattur ==
- Kanjampatti
- Kumarapuram
- Muthalnaickenpatti
- Nalli
- Nenmeni
- Venkatachalapuram
- Kosukundu
- Pappakudi

== Sivakasi Block ==
- Alamarathupatti
- Anaiyur
- Chokkampatti
- Injar
- Erichanatham
- Kakkivadanpatti
- Lakshminarayanapuram
- Mangalam
- Maraneri
- Pallapatti
- Pudukkottai
- Sengamalapatti
- Sithurajapuram
- Thayilpatti
- Velliahpuram
- Vellur
- Vilampatti
- Viswanatham.
- Zaminsalwarpatti
- Naranapuram
- Ramasamypuram

== Srivilliputhur Block ==
- Chettikulam
- Keelarajakularaman
- Mallipudur
- P.Ramachandrapuram
- Saminathapuram
- Thiruvannamalai
- Akkanapuram

== Tiruchuli Block ==
- Kalloorani
- Kulasekaranallur
- Kullampatti
- Pallimadam
- Poolangal
- Keelakurunaikulam

== Vembakottai Block ==
- Alangulam
- Appayanaickenpatti
- Elayirampannai
- Ettakkapatti
- Kakkivadanpatti
- Kanjampatti
- Mamsapuram
- Melanmarainadu
- Sankarapandiapuram
- Subramaniapuram
- Thayilpatti
- Valayapatti
- [Pulipparaipatti]

== Virudhunagar Block ==
- Alagapuri
- Appayanaickenpatti
- Kooraikundu
- Meesalur
- Pavali
- Pudupatti
- Rosalpatti
- Sankaralingapuram
- Senkottai
- Valayapatti
- P.Kumaralingapuram
- Pullalakottai

== Watrap Block ==
- Akkanapuram
- Ayan Nathampatti
- Kansapuram
- Kottaiyur
- Kunnur
- Maharajapuram
- Sundarapandiam
- Valayapatti
