= Sivakasi taluk =

Sivakasi taluka is a taluk of Virudhunagar district of the Indian state of Tamil Nadu. The headquarters of the taluk is the town of Sivakasi.

== Demographics ==
According to the 2011 census, the taluk of Sivakasi had a population of 427,072 with 211,932 males and 215,140 females. There were 1,015 women for every 1,000 men. The taluk had a literacy rate of 72.65%. Child population below the age of six was 21,815 Males and 21,321 Females.

== Villages in Sivakasi Taluk ==
1. Alamarathupatti
2. Anaikuttam
3. Anaiyur
4. Anuppankulam
5. Boovanathapuram
6. Chokkampatti
7. V.Chokkalingapuram
8. Erichanatham
9. Injar
10. Kalayarkurichi
11. Kariseri
12. Kattachinnampatti
13. Goundampatti
14. Kitchanaickenpatti
15. kiliyampatti
16. Kothaneri
17. Krishnapperi
18. Krishnapuram
19. Kumilankulam
20. Lakshminarayanapuram
21. Mangalam
22. Melamathur
23. Maraneri
24. Nadayaneri
25. Naduvapatti
26. Namaskarithanpatti
27. Nedungulam
28. Niraimathi
29. Pallapatti
30. Periapottalpatti
31. Poolavoorani
32. Pudukkottai
33. M.Pudupatti
34. Rengapalayam
35. Saminatham
36. Sengamalanatchiyarpuram
37. Sengamalapatti
38. Sevaloor
39. Sithamanaickenpatti
40. Sithurajapuram
41. Sukkiravarpatti
42. Thatchakudi
43. Thevarkulam
44. Oorampatti
45. A.Thulukkapatti
46. Vadamalapuram
47. Vadapatti
48. Vadi
49. Velliahpuram
50. Vellore
51. Vilampatti
52. Viswanatham
53. Vendurayapuram
54. Zaminsalwarpatti
55. Naranapuram
56. Mangundam Patti
