= Melanmarainadu =

- village
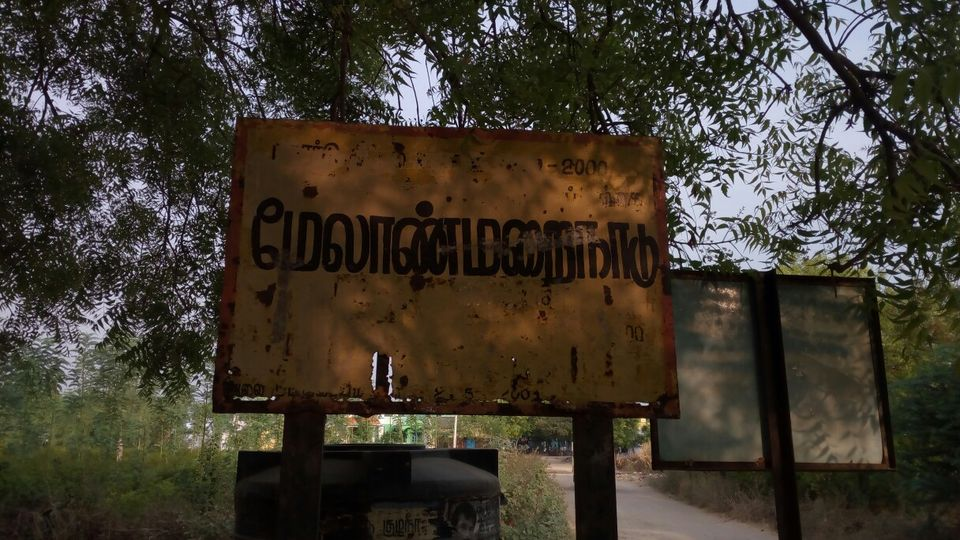
- Nickname: Aamanaadu
- Country: India
- State: Tamil Nadu
- District: Virudhunager

Languages
  - Official: Tamil
- Time zone: UTC+5:30 (IST)
- Postal code: 626127
- Vehicle registration: TN 67
- Lok Sabha constituency: Virudhunagar
- Vidhan Sabha constituency: Sivakasi

Melanmarainadu or Meelanmaraindu is hamlet in Vembakottai Block in Virudhunagar District of Tamil Nadu State, India. It comes under Appayanaickenpatti Panchayath. In the 2011 census it had 600 households.

== Geography ==
Melanmarainadu is located 49 kilometres (30 mi) south from district headquarters in Virudhunagar. It is 11 kilometres (6.8 mi) from Vemabakkotai Vembakkotai and 9 kilometres (5.6 mi) from Thiruvenkatam. The village is 590 kilometres (370 mi) from the state capital Chennai, Tamil Nadu, in the southern part of India. The mother tongue of the residents is Tamil, even though a considerable population speaks Telugu. and the peoples majorly doing on work at farming and cackers ? and spin milling colli ? works.

Melanmarainadu's pin code is 626127. It has a postal office facility available in the village and its head office is at Tamil Nadu Cements Alangulam, Virudhunagar. Melanmarainadu is surrounded by Kuruvikulam Block towards the south, the Sankarankovil Block towards the west, the Rajapalaiyam Block towards the west, and the Srivilliputtur Block towards the north. Sankarankovil, Rajapalayam, Sivakasi, kovilpatti are the nearby cities to Melanmarainadu.

== Nearby colleges ==
- Varatharaj College Of Engineering
- PSR College

== Nearby schools ==
- R.C.Primary School, Melanmarainadu
- St.Antony's High School, Melanmarainadu

== The reason for name ==
Some people say that the word came from "Merku All marai nadu" which means west side place where people hide. So in the past, this village was entirely covered up by 'veli' (a thorny plant which can be found in the countryside) (karuvela maram is different). But now the village is developed. Mainly all are people are farmers, and cultivation is based on only the rainfall which is not regular due to the geography of the place. This village has two schools. R.C elementary school and St. Antony's High School where more than 400 children are studying. Both schools are being run by Don Bosco Christian missionary. Children from nearby villages are studying here. It has a Library newly opened for public access, as it helps the growing children to broaden their knowledge towards reading many varieties of books. It has one bus stand. Bus facilities from Sivakasi and Rajapalayam via Tamil Nadu Cements Alangulam. Even though it is a small village it creates many engineers, technicians, and doctors. And well-known Tamil author Melanmai Ponnusamy belong from this village.

There is another village nearby called 'Keelanmarainadu'. This village is 5 kilometres (3.1 mi) from Alangulam Cements towards 'Sevlapatti'.
