= Sankarapandiapuram =

- Village
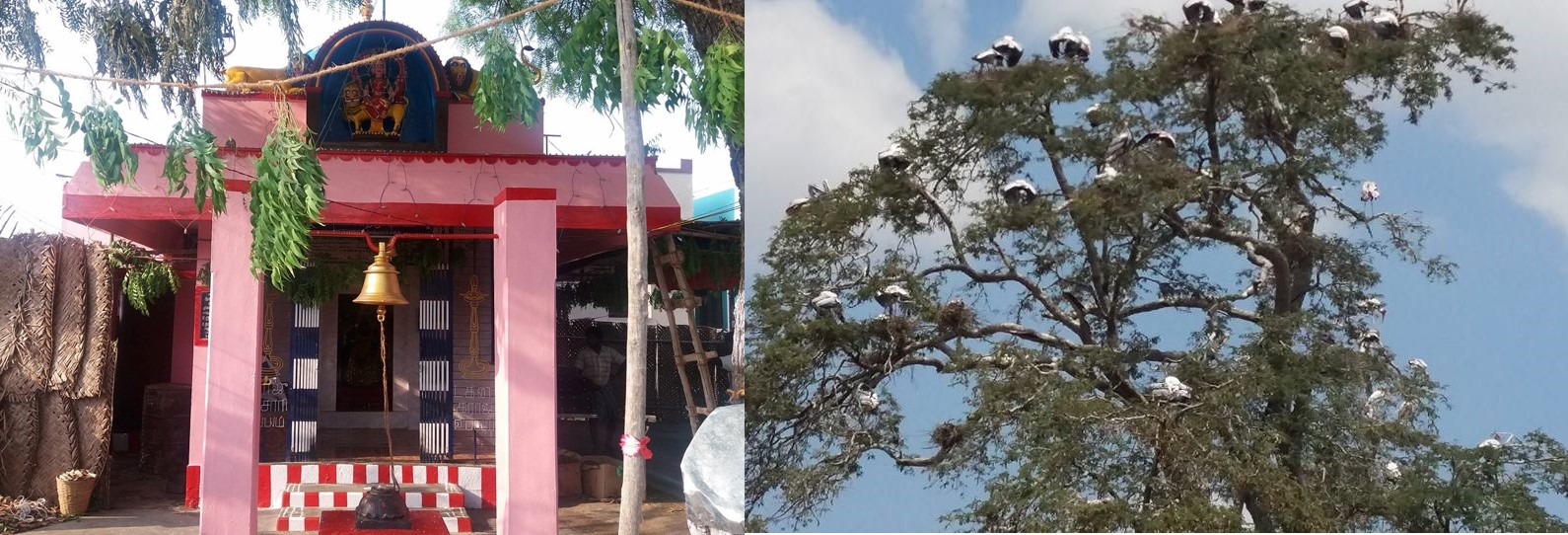
- A bird sanctuary and temple

- Location in Tamil Nadu, India Sankarapandiapuram (India)
- Coordinates: 9.29°N 77.78°E
- Country: India
- State: Tamil Nadu
- District: Virudhunagar District
- Elevation: 94 m (308 ft)

Languages
  - Official: Tamil
- Time zone: UTC+5:30 (IST)
- PIN: 626 201
- Telephone code: 91 4562
- Vehicle registration: TN 67
- Distance from Chennai: 562 kilometres (349 mi)
- Distance from Virudhunagar: 48 kilometres (30 mi)
- Distance from Vembakottai: 8.8 kilometres (5.5 mi)

Sankarapandiapuram is a panchayat village in Virudhunagar district of Tamil Nadu, India. Initially, the village came under Sattur taluk, it is now a part of the newly formed Vembakottai taluk. It is located on the way from Sattur to Sankarankovil or Rajapalayam via Elayirampannai route. The village has two sections namely Kila (Meaning: East) and Mela (Meaning: West) Sankarapandiapuram with around 500 households. The total population of the village is 1026 of which 497 males and 529 females.

== Geography and Climate ==
Sankarapandiapuram is located close to the border of the Tenkasi and Thoothukudi districts. The closest town to the village is Kovilpatti which is 19.3 km away. The climate of Virudhunagar district is hot and dry coupled with low relative humidity. This climate prevails in Sankarapandiapuram too.

== Language ==
The main language of the village is Tamil. Though Tamil is the official language, unofficially Telugu is spoken by the majority of the village population. This scenario is common in several villages of Tamil Nadu. Telugu spoken in this village and nearby villages is a variant of Telugu of Andhra Pradesh. This is likely due to the incorporation of Tamil words over a period of time. The presence of Telugu-speaking people can be seen in several districts of Tamil Nadu.

== Bird sanctuary ==
Sankarapandiapuram is well known for its bird sanctuary in the district. The birds namely Egrets, Ibis, Storks and Herons visit the village during monsoon season (October) for breeding and their stay will continue until the end of April. Most of these birds are believed to come from overseas, particularly in Australia and Nigeria. According to the locals, the village has a few centuries old a massive tamarind tree, many decades-old neem and other tree species that can shelter the birds. These birds obtain their food mainly from nearby Vembakottai and Irukkankudi reservoirs. The people of this village have requested the Government of Tamil Nadu to establish a bird sanctuary in the village due to the frequent visits by the people from nearby villages and cities. During the Deepavali festival, people in this village avoid using firecrackers to protect the birds from being displaced.

== Industry ==
The main livelihood of Sankarapandiapuram is agriculture. Most of the farmlands rely on rainfall for the cultivation of crops. Northeast Monsoon is the main source of rainfall that starts around October and ends in December. The black loamy soil of the area is renowned for the cultivation of cotton. Other crops such as black gram, green gram, red gram, sesame, cumbu, ragi, maize, chilli and cholam are also cultivated. Some traditional varieties of cumbu, cholam and some minor millets are still cultivated here. Some years ago, an attempt to grow lime fruit by a farmer in this village showed a promising outcome that encouraged other farmers to follow. In addition to agriculture, Sankarapandiapuram has a few fireworks and match industries which employ people throughout the year.

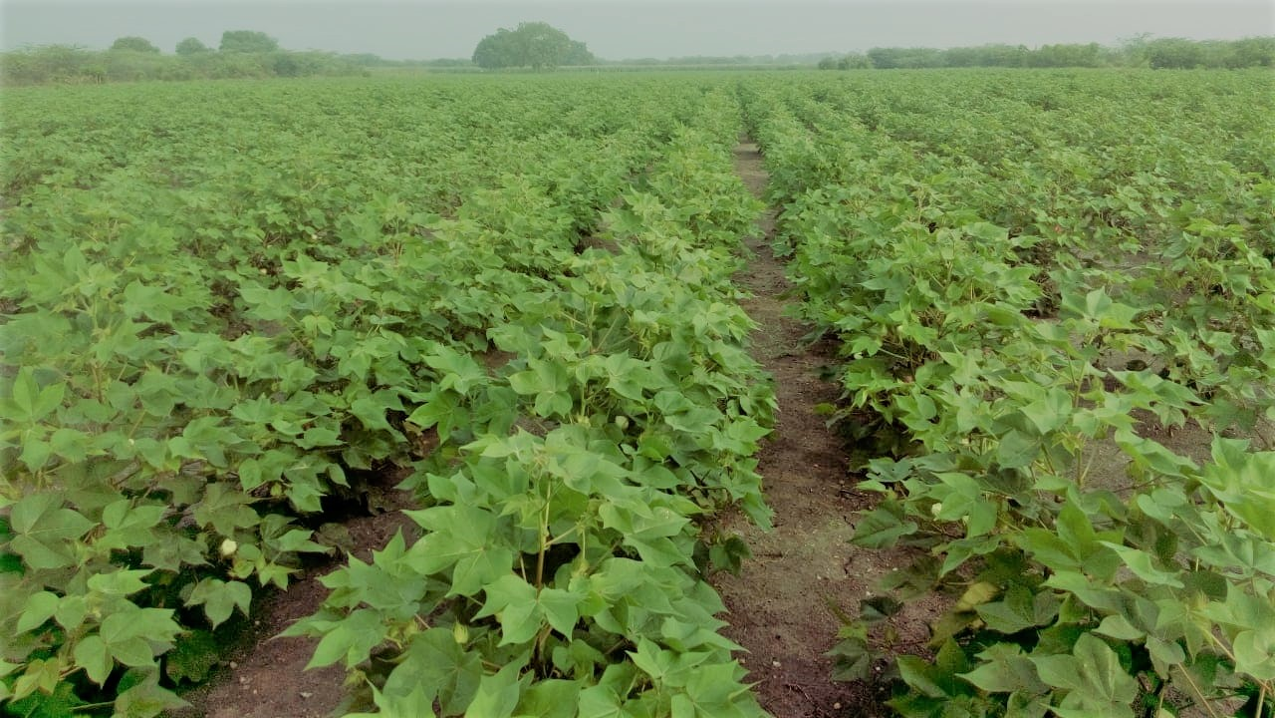
The cultivation of the cotton crop in Sankarapandiapuram

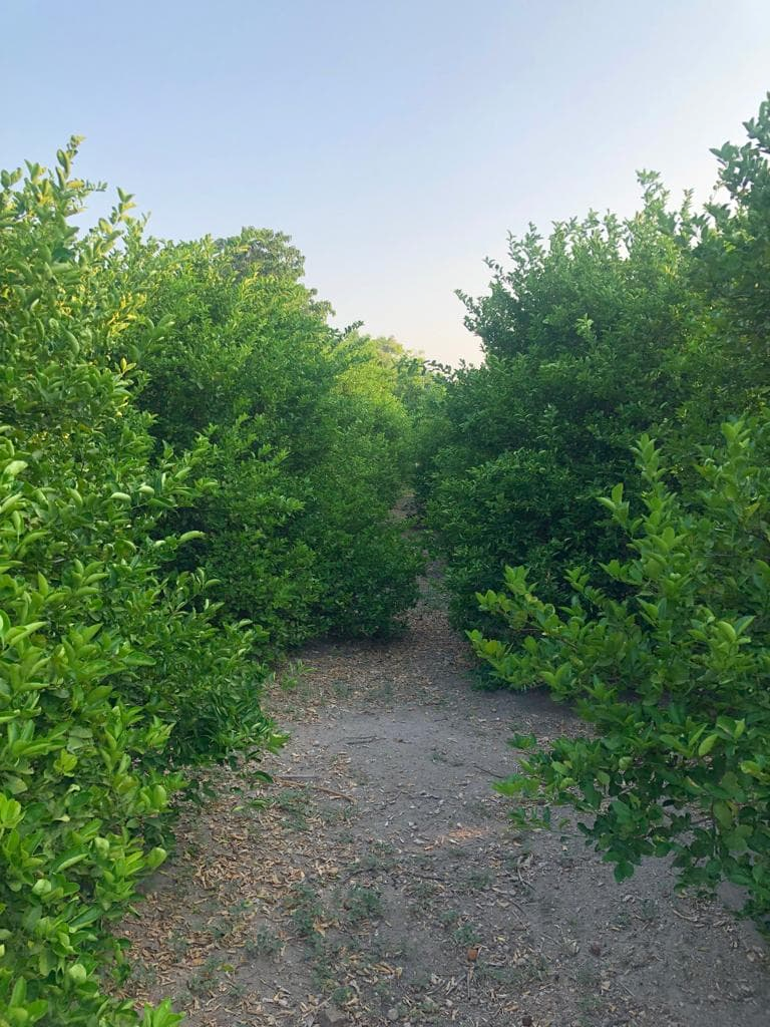
Lime crop in Sankarapandiapuram

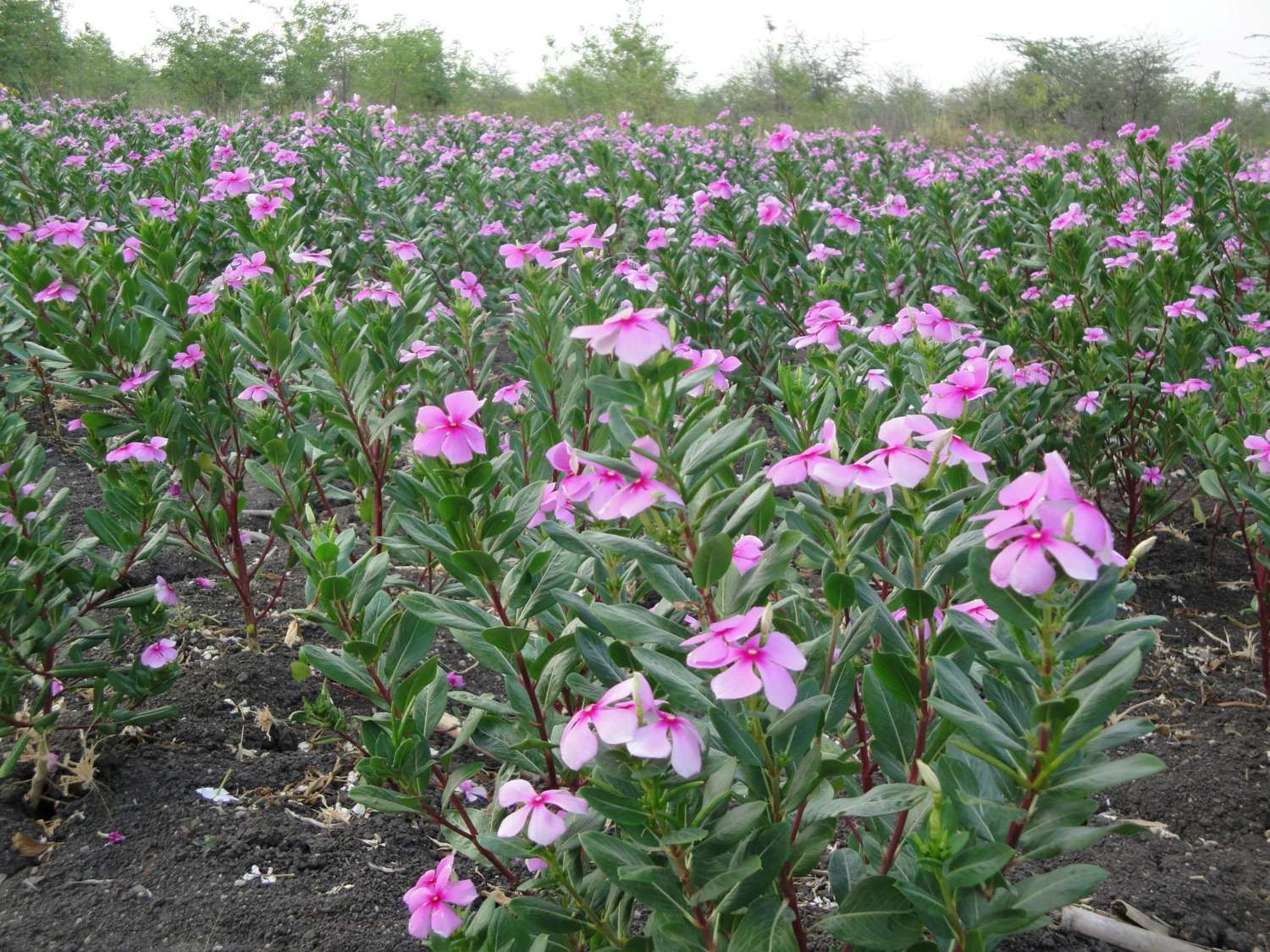
Periwinkle crop in Sankarapandiapuram

== Dog breed ==
Sankarapandiapuram along with Chippiparai and nearby villages are well known for a dog breed known as Chippiparai. Chippiparai is a panchayat village located 6.6 km southwest of Sankarapandiapuram. The name Chippiparai was coined for the dog breed because of its origin in Chippiparai and adjoining areas. Chippiparai is a famous dog breed and is considered a pride of Tamil Nadu. It is an ancient dog breed used by kings, known for its physical feature, braveness, speed, intelligence and friendliness to humans.

== Festival ==
Sankarapandiapuram has many temples for Hindu deities namely Kaliamman, Vinayagar, Perumal, Onnamman and Rachathiamman. Every year, the celebration of the village Pongal takes place in the second week of the Tamil month Chithirai. This is a two days event celebrated by the village people and their relatives grandly. After the Pongal celebration, a prevailing custom is to organise traditional folk music and dance. This is based on a belief among the locals that following such a custom would bring good fortune to the village. In addition, separate Pongal celebrations for Onnamman and Rachathiamman are taking place every year.

== Notable people ==
R. Srinivasan Naidu a former member of the legislative assembly of the Sattur constituency (1967-1971) from the Swatantra Party was born in this village.

== Schools ==
Two schools are present in Sankarapandiapuram, they are Government Primary and Higher Secondary Schools.

== Sankarapandiapuram Melam ==
Melam or Mathalam is a percussion musical instrument commonly played during special occasions in Tamil Nadu. At Sankarapandiapuram, there is a melam group called 'Ganeshan melam' which is notable for their outstanding performance at festivals.
