= Anaiyur =

Anaiyur may refer to:

- Anaiyur, Madurai, a town in Madurai district in the state of Tamil Nadu, India
- Anaiyur, Virudhunagar, a town in Virudhunagar district in the state of Tamil Nadu, India
- Anaiyur, Ramanathapuram, a small village situated in Abiramam block, Kamuthi taluk, Ramanathapuram district, Tamil Nadu, India
