= Akkanapuram =

- Village
- Location in Tamil Nadu, India
- Coordinates: 12.958988°N 79.778705°E
- Country: India
- State: Tamil Nadu
- District: Virudhunagar district

Government
  - Type: Panchayati raj (India)
  - Body: Gram panchayat
- Elevation: 141 m (463 ft)

Population (2011)
  - Total: 531

Languages
  - Official: Tamil
- Time zone: UTC+5:30 (IST)
- Telephone code: 04562
- Nearest city: Srivilliputhur

Akkanapuram is a village located in Watrap block, Srivilliputhur taluk, Virudhunagar district, Tamil Nadu State, India. The village is identified by two names: Akkanapuram Villaku and Akkanapuram itself. Most of the people that live in the village are Paraiyar and are farmers.

== History ==
The village was erected by a group of people belonging to the Maravar community. Then later in the time of the Nayakas, the village was given to one of the queens of King Thirumalai Nayak who was called Akkamal. This then led to the village being named Akkammal Puram and then later being renamed to the current name, Akkanapuram.

== Transport ==
The village naming difference arose only because of the bus stop junction, because most of the buses do not transport passengers into the village, but just drop them at the 3-way junction Akkanapuram Villaku (SH - 182). The west side road of the village reaches to the town Watrap and the east side road of the village reaches to Alagapuri: at that junction it crosses at (NH -208 ) and again continues till Virudhunagar. The north side road of the village goes to Periayur. The closest city is Madurai, and nearest towns are Watrap (12 kilometres), Srivilliputhur (21 kilometres), Pallapatti (27 kilometres), Virudhunagar (28 kilometres), and Sivakasi (29 kilometres). Also, the closest airport is Madurai Airport which is 50 kilometres away.
