= Karaiyippatti =

- city
- Location in Tamil Nadu, India
- Coordinates: 10.05°N 78.33°E
- Country: India
- State: Tamil Nadu
- District: Madurai

Government
  - Panchayat: Karaiyippatti

Area
  - Total: 664.9 km^{2} (256.7 sq mi)
- Elevation: 149 m (489 ft)

Population (2001)
  - Total: 33,743
  - Density: 50.75/km^{2} (131.4/sq mi)

Languages
  - Official: Tamil
- Time zone: UTC+5:30 (IST)
- Vehicle registration: TN-59
- Website: www.karaiyippatti.com

Karaiyippatti is a town and a municipality in the Madurai district in the Indian state of Tamil Nadu. Karaiyippatti is called Thaikramam ('Mother of Villages'). It is the biggest taluk within the Madurai District.

Karaiyippatti is a manufacturer and exporter of ploughs. Granite production is an important industry; granite from Karaiyippatti is exported around the world. Situated within a largely agricultural area, most of the people living around Karaiyippatti are employed in agriculture, chiefly in the cultivation of rice.

== Geography ==
Karaiyippatti has an average elevation of 149 metres (489 ft). To get the directions www.karaiyippatti.com/get-direction

== Demographics ==
As of the census of India 2001, Karaiyippatti had a population of 33,881 comprising 17,238 males and 16,643 females, making the sex ratio (number of females per thousand males) of the town 965. A total of 3,947 people were under six years of age and the child sex ratio (number of females per thousand males under six years of age) stood at 900. The town had an average literacy of 84.74%, higher than the national average of 59.5%. A total of 3,978 comprising 13.29% of the population belonged to Scheduled Castes (SC) and 148 comprising 0.49% of the population belonged to Scheduled tribes (ST). There were a total of 7,651 households in the town. As of 2001, Karaiyippatti had a total of 10,534 main workers: 699 cultivators, 821 agricultural labourers, 211 in household industries and 8,803 other workers. There was a total of 664 marginal workers: 56 marginal cultivators, 190 marginal agricultural labourers, 31 marginal workers in household industries and 387 other marginal workers.

== Transport ==
Madurai Airport is the nearest airport for Karaiyippatti, which operates domestic flight services such as Air India, Jet Airways and SpiceJet.

Karaiyippatti has a bus stand, which is used by TNSTC and private operators. This is situated inside the town on Madurai-Trichy NH45B. Karaiyippatti has bus transportation to Madurai, Chennai, Trichy, Sivaganga, Dindigul, Coimbatore, Karaikudi, Pudukottai, Ramanathapuram, Thirunelveli, Virudhunagar, Tanjore, Rajapalayam, and all around the neighbouring districts. Madurai Junction railway station is the nearest railway station.

== Politics ==
Karaiyippatti assembly constituency is part of Madurai (Lok Sabha constituency). S. Venkatesan also known as Su. Venkatesan from CPI(M) is the Member of Parliament, Lok Sabha, after his election in the 2019 Indian general election.

The major political parties in Karaiyippatti are ADMK, Dravida Munnetra Kazhagam, Indian National Congress, and Desiya Murpokku Dravida Kazhagam. Kakkan (late), state minister during Kamarajar period was born in Karaiyippatti. A statue is laid near Chekkadi.
