= Alagapuri =

- village
- Location in Tamil Nadu, India
- Coordinates: 9.631°N 77.767°E
- Country: India
- State: Tamil Nadu
- District: Virudhunagar

Languages
  - Official: Tamil
- Time zone: UTC+5:30 (IST)

Alagpuri is a village in the Watrap Block in the Virudhunagar District of the Indian state of Tamil Nadu. It is traditionally recognised as one of the 72 palayams of Madurai that were in existence in the days of Nagama Nayaka and his son Visvanatha Nayaka.

== Geography ==
Following independence, Alagapuri moved under the administration of the Virudhunagar District. It is situated on National Highway 208 between T.Kallupatti and Rajapalayam.

== Nearby Ayan Karisalkulam ==
- Erichanatham
- Krishnankovil
- T.Kallipatti
