= Expedition to Ettayapuram =

- Part of Campaigns of Tirumala Nayaka
Date	Unknown
Location	Ettaiyapuram, India
Result	Madurai Nayaks victory

Belligerents
Madurai Nayakas: Kingdom of Ramnad	Polygar of Ettaiyapuram

Commanders and leaders
Tirumala Nayaka; Raghunatha Sethupathi	Unknown (executed)

The Expedition to Ettayapuram was an expedition led by Raghunatha Sethupathi on behalf of the Tirumala Nayaka to suppress a rebellion by the local poligar. The poligar of Ettayapuram had gathered several other discontented Polygars and openly defied the authority of Madurai. Raghunatha Sethupathi marched with his forces defeated the rebel confederation and put the Ettayapuram poligar to death. By punishing the allied poligars and restoring order he brought peace back to the Tirunelveli region.

== Background ==
After the partition of the Ramnad Kingdom Ramanathapuram region was given to Raghunatha Deva, Sivaganga was allotted to Tambi Thevar, and the Tiruvadanai area was jointly assigned to Thanakka and Narayana the younger brothers of Raghunatha. However, not long after this division both Thanakka and Tamphi passed away. the entire Marava country gradually came under the control of Raghunatha Sethupathi.

Before this, Raghunatha had already captured important places such as Thiruvarur, Aranthangi, Devakottai, Pattukkottai, and Mannarkovil from the Tanjore Raja making him the ruler of a vast territory. He remained a loyal supporter of Tirumala Nayaka and soon proved his loyalty in action by defeating the Mysore army in the Battle of Madurai in 1656. Pleased with this victory the Nayak showed great gratitude by cancelling Raghunatha’s tribute granting him the titles of Tirumalai Sethupathi and Protector of the Queen’s Thali and allowing him the rare honour of using a lion-faced palanquin. He also rewarded him with the villages of Tiruchuli, Tiruppuvanam, and Pallimadam.

== Expedition ==
Acting on behalf of the Nayak, Raghunatha Sethupathi first faced a Muhammadan rebellion led by Khutab Khan, which he suppressed with ease, earning him the title Protector of the Country. Soon after, he was given a more serious challenge when the powerful poligar of Ettaiyapuram gathered several rebellious polygars and rose against the Madurai king Tirumala Nayaka. Raghunatha Sethupathi was entrusted with crushing this revolt. He led his forces into battle defeated the combined poligar army, executed the Ettaiyapuram poligar, and severely punished his allies. he restored peace and order in the Tirunelveli region.

== Aftermath ==
To reward the Sethupathi for his victory over the poligar of Ettaiyapuram, Tirumala Nayaka granted him a large tract of land around Mannarkovil in the Tirunelveli region. He was also appointed as the protector of the Pearl Fishery Coast which was a major source of income for the Nayak.

== See also ==
- Kingdom of Ramnad
- Sriranga III
- Vijayanagara Empire
