= Alangulam =

Alangulam may refer to:

- Alangulam, Virudhunagar, a town in Virudhunagar district, Tamil Nadu in India
- Alangulam, Tenkasi, a town in Tenkasi district, Tamil Nadu in India
