= Pungamarathupatti =

Village in Tamil Nadu

- village
- Country: India
- State: Tamil Nadu
- District: Virudhunagar

Languages
  - Official: Tamil
- Time zone: UTC+5:30 (IST)
- Postal code: 626101
- Vehicle registration: TN67
- Coastline: 0 kilometres (0 mi)

Pungamarathupatti is a village in Virudhunagar district, Tamil Nadu. It falls under the Aruppukottai taluk.

Pungamarathupatti is 26 km away from Aruppukottai, 6 km north of Pudur and 6 km east of Pandalgudi. The village consists of 100 houses. Agriculture is a field of work in the area. Nearly 10 percent of the location's population serves in the Indian Army.

Neighboring villages include Maravarperumgudi, Kalluppatti, Kanjampatti, Salukuvarpatti, Maniyarampatti, and Krishnapuram.
