= Sankaralingapuram =

Sankaralingapuran
- Village
- Location in Tamil Nadu, India
- Coordinates: 9.37°N 77.93°E
- Country: India
- State: Tamil Nadu
- District: Virudhunagar

Government
  - President: Menakshi Sundaram B

Area
  - Total: 3 km^{2} (1.2 sq mi)
- Elevation: 56 m (184 ft)

Population (2001)
  - Total: 2,274
  - Density: 413/km^{2} (1,070/sq mi)

Languages
  - Official: Tamil
- Time zone: UTC+5:30 (IST)
- PIN: 626 119
- Telephone code: 91-4562
- Vehicle registration: TN 67

Sanakarlingapuram is an industrial panchayat village in Virudhunagar district in the Indian state of Tamil Nadu.

== Overview ==
The village is located in the back of Arjuna river, a dry river. The village has contents of black soil around it, suitable for cotton cultivation. It lies in between National Highway 7 and the state highway connecting Virudhunagar and Sivakasi. The village has a proud history for its handloom weaving industry. Nowadays, there are not many in-house handloom industries as in the past. The village also has many other small scale cottage industries like matches and fireworks.there are many fireworks owned sankaralingapuram people like SankarGanesh fireworks, pappa fire fireworks, Rathinam fireworks, balaiya chettiar fuse factory, Naahaa fire works..etcc

== Geography ==
Sankaralingapuram is located at 9.37°N 77.93°E. It has an average elevation of 56 metres (183 feet). The god Kali Amman, Petchi Amman, sivan kovil, Sowdambiga Amman and mantha kambuthumaram are very powerful gods in this village and every year they worship the god in Panguni and Chitirai as a festival for five days with cultural and Gramiya functions.

== Demographics ==
As of 2001 India census, Sankaralingapuram had a population of 2,274. Males constitute 49% of the population and females 51%. Sankaralingapuram has an average literacy rate of 75%, higher than the national average of 59.5%: male literacy is 82%, and female literacy is 69%. In Sankaralingapuram, 11% of the population is under 6 years of age.

== Transportation ==
The Village is well connected by bus from Virudhunagar and Sivakasi. The private transport "TAMT" also serves between Virudhunagar and Rajapalayam through this village.

=== Railways ===
The railway station which was built during the British rule is now demolished during the gauge conversion work. Only some stones are remaining from the old establishment

== Educational institutions ==
The following are the educational institutions in Sankaralingapuram

1. Government Higher Secondaray School
2. Panchayat Union Elementary School

== Festivals ==
- Panguni Pongal (Kali amman) festival is the famous one but it is now happening only in the month of Paguni.
- chitrai Pongal (Ramalinga Sowdeswari amman) festival famous on 18 villages
- Muthalamman Pongal festival is one of the feast, it's mainly beg for get rain, it's conducted on before or after Deepawali.
