= Tamil Nadu Cement Corporation =

Indian cement manufacturer

Tamil Nadu Cement Corporation Limited தமிழ் நாடு சிமன்ட் கார்ப்பரேஷன் லிமிடெட்
- Company type: A Government of Tamil Nadu Undertaking
- Industry: Cement, AC Sheets, Hollow Blocks, Concrete
- Founded: 1978
- Headquarters: 5th Floor, Aavin Illam, No.3A, Pasumpon Muthuramalinga Thevar Road, Nandanam, Chennai, Tamil Nadu, India
- Area served: Tamil Nadu
- Website: Official website

Tamil Nadu Cement Corporation Limited (TANCEM) is a state-government undertaking of Government of Tamil Nadu located in the Indian state of Tamil Nadu. It produces cement, AC sheets, hollow blocks, concrete and other building materials.

== History ==
Tamil Nadu Cement Corporation Limited (TANCEM) was incorporated on 1 April 1976 to take over and operate the existing cement plant in Alangulam, Virudhunagar with an authorized share capital of Rs. 18 crores. In February 2021, indeed reported that TANCEM was employing about 300 employees In October 2021, Tamil Nadu Chief Minister M.K. Stalin launched Valimai, a new cement brand from TANCEM.

== TANCEM Products ==
Tamil Nadu Cement Corporation Limited (TANCEM) has four vertical business:

- Cements – It manufacture and supply "ARASU" branded "Arasu Cements" O.P.C Cements (Grade 43 and 53) and "ARASU Super Star" branded P.P.C cement
- Asbestos Sheet – It manufacture and supply "ARASU" branded "Arasu A.C Sheets" Asbestos Sheet
- Stoneware Pipes – It manufacture and supply "ARASU" branded "Arasu S.W Pipes"

== TANCEM Operation ==
=== Cements Plants ===
Tamil Nadu Cement Corporation Limited (TANCEM) has 2 cement plants: Alangulam Cement Works and Ariyalur Cement Works.

Alangulam Cement Works:

- Location – Alangulam, Virudhunagar, Virudhunagar District
- Commencement – 1970 – 71
- Products – ARASU brand 43 Grade OPC/PPC Cements, Portland Pozzalana Cement (PPC), Ordinary Portland Cement (OPC) [43 Grade]

Ariyalur Cement Works :

- Location – Ariyalur
- Commencement – 1979
- Capacity – 5 lakhs tonnes per annum

=== Asbestos Sheet Plants ===
Alangulam Asbestos Sheet Plant:

- Location – Alangulam, Virudhunagar, Virudhunagar District
- Commencement – October 1981
- Products – ARASU brand AC Sheets
- Capacity – 36000 tonnes per annum

=== Stoneware Pipes Plants ===
- Location – Vridhachalaam, Cuddalore District
- Commencement – 1962
- Capacity – 600 MTs per month

== Criticism ==
The Comptroller and Auditor General of India (CAG), the supreme audit institution of India, reprimanded the state-owned Tamil Nadu Cement Corporation (TANCEM) for unlawfully operating eight mines without acquiring environmental clearance. It reportedly accused that out of the nine mines leased from the state government, TANCEM had only obtained clearance for one mine in the Ariyalur district.
