= Pallapatti =

Pallapatti may refer to places in India:

- Pallapatti, Karur, Tamil Nadu
- Pallapatti, Virudhunagar, Tamil Nadu
