= A & F Harvey Brothers =

Coordinates: 8.7011°N 77.3649°E

A & F Harvey Brothers, first Spinning Cotton Mill, established by Scottish brothers Andrew Harvey and Frank Harvey, in the year 1880.

== Early history ==
Andrew and Frank Harvey were born in the year 1850 and 1854, respectively, to a farming family in Scotland. They traveled to India during 19th century and landed in Madras. They started the business of bailing cotton and established the first cotton press mill in Virudupatti, near Tuticorin. They started an export business in cotton. In 1885 Andrew harnessed a waterfall in Papanasam to run a spinning mill. Frank died in 1905 and Andrew died in the year 1915, and their memorial was inaugurated by Sir James Doak, the then Managing Director at Ambasamudram in 1949

== List of mills ==
- 1880 - A & F Harvey Cotton Press in Virudupatti
- 1885 - Tinnevelly Mills Ltd now called as Thirunelvelli
- Coral Mills in Tuticorin, India
- Madura Mills in Madurai
