= Keelarajakularaman =

Keelrajakularaman is a village in Rajapalayam Taluk, Virudhunagar District, in Tamil Nadu, India. This village is situated about 12 km from Rajalapalayam on the way to Alangulam Cement Factory.

== Economy ==
The Irrigation tank situated in this village is the second largest in the Virudhunagar district next to Srivilliputhur.Agriculture is the major occupation carried out by the people residing here.

== Facilities ==
Sub registrar office situated here is the major office after Rajapalayam, Sivakasi and Srivilliputhur. There is a police station also in this village.

== Schools ==
There is an elementary school with two blocks and a Government Higher Secondary School located in the village.
