= Kilavikulam =

- Location in Tamil Nadu, India
- Coordinates: 9°21′37.4″N 77°35′08.3″E
- Country: India

Kilavikulam is a village in Rajapalayam Taluk in Virudhunagar District of Tamil Nadu State in India. It is located at 50 km from the District Headquarters of Virudhunagar and located 597 km from Chennai (Capital City of Tamil Nadu State).

== Climate ==
The village is a region of extreme hotness and low humidity. The north east monsoon provides the bulk of rainfall during the months of October and November. The north east monsoons, which starts in June and lasts until mid August makes the region relatively cooler than in other months.

== Economy ==
The local economy includes surgical cotton, polyspin industries as well as farming.

== Culture ==
People follow orthodox Hinduism and the Thai pongal and Chithirai Pongal festivals are celebrated.
