= Melanmai Ponnusamy =

Indian writer

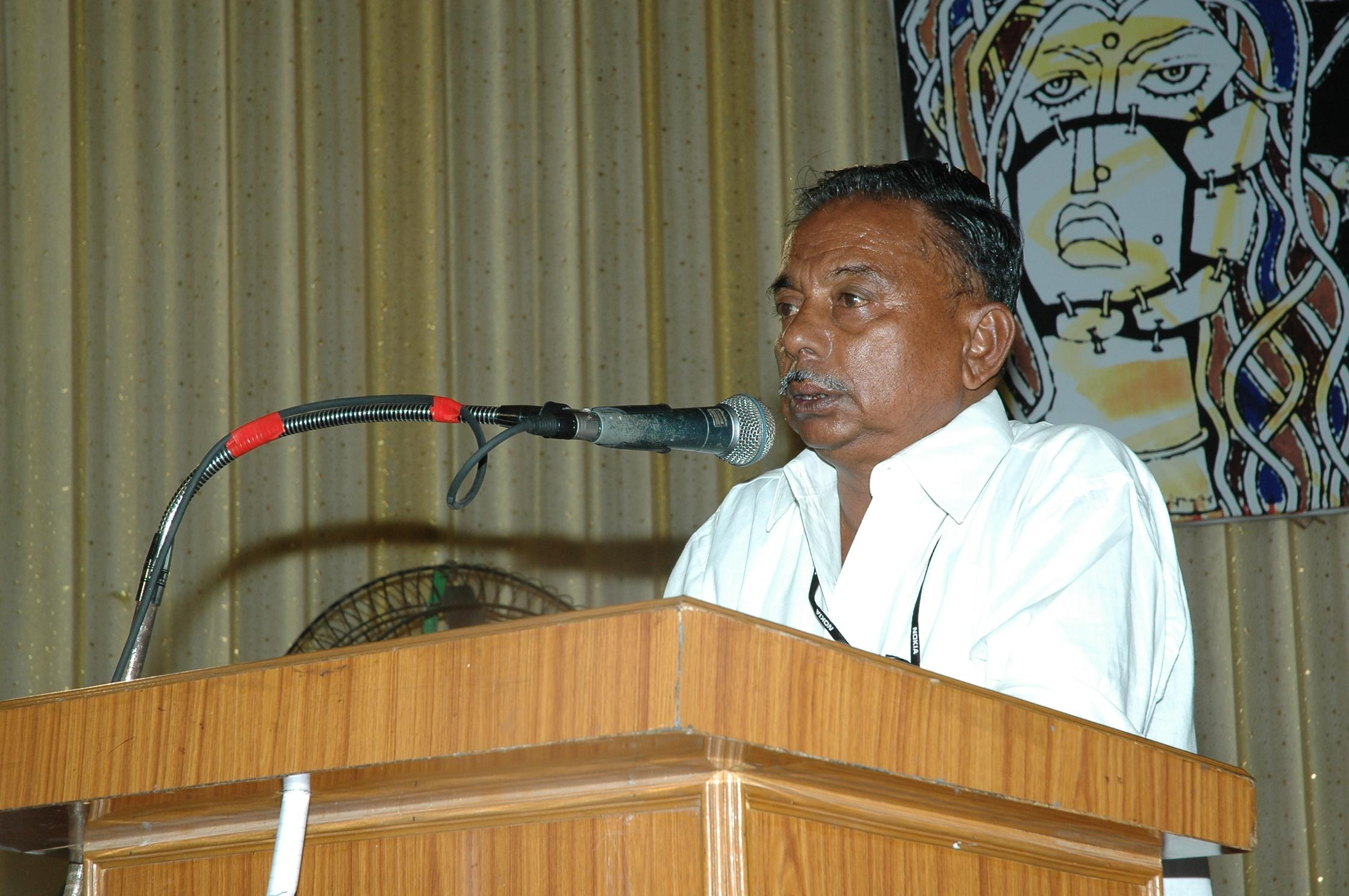
- Born: 1951; Melanmarainadu, Ramanathapuram district,Madras Presidency, British India,(now in Virudhunagar district, Tamil Nadu, India).
- Died: 30 October 2017 (aged 66); Chennai, Tamil Nadu, India
- Citizenship: Indian
- Occupation: Business
- Spouse: Ponnu Thai
- Children: 2 Daughters,Venmani(Son)
- Writing career
- Language: Tamil
- Genres: Short Story, Novel, Novella
- Subject: Literature
- Notable awards: Sahitya Akademi Award (2008)
- Movement: Marxist

Melanmai Ponnusamy(Born 1951 – 30 October 2017) was a Sahitya Akademi Award winning Tamil from Tamil Nadu writer who wrote about the plight of the poor and the lives of rural people.

== Biography ==
Melanmai Ponnusamy was born in Melanmarainadu village in Virudhunagar District.He was also a farmer and ran a grocery shop in his village.He was a Marxist by political orientation and a member of Communist Party of India (Marxist) (CPI-M).

== Literary career ==
His first short story was published in 1972 in the literary journal Semmalar (lit. Red flower. CPI-M's literary publication). His works have since appeared in mainstream Tamil magazines like Ananda Vikatan and Kalki. He credited Soviet literature as a major influence in his writing style and choice of subjects. His works are set in rural Tamil Nadu and deal with the lives of peasants. As of 2009, he has written 23 short story collections, six novellas, six novels and an essay collection. He was awarded the 2008 Sahitya Akademi Award posthumously for his Tamil short story Minsaarap poo (lit. the electric flower). He was also awarded the 2009 Makkal TV award for his contributions to Tamil Literature. He was a founder member and the general secretary of the Marxist writers' organisation - Tamil Nadu Progressive Writers Association (TNPWA). He was married to Ponnuthai and had three children.

== Death ==
Ponnusamy died on 30 October 2017 at the age of 66 when he underwent treatment in Government General Hospital in Chennai for nerve-related illnesses.

== Bibliography ==
=== Short Stories ===
- Thaesiya mayil (தேசிய மயில்)
- Venpoo manam (வெண்பூ மனம்)
- Manappoo (மனப்பூ)
- Ettarai (எட்டறை)
- Viral (விரல்)
- Oru Maalai Poothu Varum (ஒரு மாலை பூத்து வரும்)
- Maanuda Piravagam (மானுடப் பிரவாகம்)
- Sibigal (சிபிகள்)
- Minsaarap poo (மின்சாரப் பூ)
- Anbu vaasam (அன்பூ வாசம்)
- Uyirkaatru (உயிர்க்காற்று)

=== Novel ===
- Uyir nilam (உயிர் நிலம்)
- Ini (இனி)
- Suriya vaervai (சூரிய வேர்வை)
- Poochumai (பூச்சுமை)
- Pookkum maalai (பூக்கும் மாலை)
- Muttrukai (முற்றுகை)
- Agaya Sirukathaigal (ஆகாயச் சிறகுகள்)
- Kaagitham (காகிதம்)

=== Essay ===
- Sirugathaip padaippin ul vivakaaram (சிறுகதைப் படைப்பின் உள் விவகாரம்)

== Awards and recognitions ==
- Sahitya Akademi Award for Tamil (2009)
- Makkal TV award
- Ilakkiya Chinthanai Award
- S. P. Adithanar Literary Award

== See also ==
- List of Sahitya Akademi Award winners for Tamil
- List of Indian writers
- List of Tamil-language writers
