= Veeracholan =

Veeracholan is a village located in the Narikudi block of Virudhunagar district in the state of Tamil Nadu, India. According to the 2011 Census of India, the village has a population of 5,746 individuals, comprising 2,923 males and 2,823 females. The village spans an area of approximately 10.66 square kilometres.

== Educational institutions ==
Veeracholan has several educational facilities:

- Government Higher Secondary School, Veeracholan: A government-run institution providing education up to the higher secondary level.
- Asma Matriculation Higher Secondary School: A private matriculation school offering education from primary to higher secondary levels.
- Panchayat Union Middle School, Veeracholan West: A government middle school serving the western part of the village.
- Panchayat Union Primary School, Veeracholan East: A government primary school serving the eastern part of the village.

Additionally, the village is home to the Khairathul Islam Arabic College, an institution funded by public contributions. Graduates of this college receive the Khairi title, which is recognised in their professional careers.

== Economy and agriculture ==
The economy of Veeracholan is primarily based on agriculture. Major crops cultivated include paddy, groundnut, and sesame seeds. The village has a total irrigated area of approximately 144.23 hectares, with irrigation sources comprising boreholes/tube wells and lakes or tanks.

== Monday market ==
A traditional Monday market is held in Veeracholan, attracting people from surrounding areas. The market offers a variety of household items, including plastic and steel utensils, vegetables, snacks, fruits, and flowers, sold by local vendors. Additionally, poultry (hens), goats, and sheep are available for sale. This weekly event has been a part of the village's tradition for over a century. If a festival coincides with a Monday, the market is held on the preceding day.

== Infrastructure and amenities ==
Veeracholan is equipped with essential infrastructure and amenities:

- Healthcare: The village has a community health centre, a primary health centre, and a primary health sub-centre, providing medical services to residents.
- Postal services: A post office is available within the village, facilitating mail and communication services.
- Banking: The Indian Overseas Bank operates a branch in Veeracholan, offering financial services to the local population.
- Transportation: Public and private bus services connect Veeracholan to nearby towns and cities. The nearest railway station is located more than 10 kilometres away.

== Demographics ==
As per the 2011 census:

- Children aged 0–6 constitute approximately 10.41% of the total population.
- The average sex ratio of the village is 966 females per 1,000 males, slightly lower than the Tamil Nadu state average of 996.
- The child sex ratio is 929, compared to the state average of 943.
- The literacy rate in Veeracholan is 83.37%, higher than the state average of 80.09%. Male literacy stands at 90.39%, while female literacy is at 76.13%.

== Governance ==
Veeracholan is administrated by a Gram Panchayat, with the Sarpanch serving as the elected head of the village. The village falls under the Tiruchuli Assembly Constituency and the Ramanathapuram Lok Sabha Constituency.
