= T. Velangudi =

T.Velangudi
- Village Panchayat
- Location in India
- Coordinates: 9.608244°N 78.375769°E
- Country: India
- District: Virudhunagar

Population
  - Total: 1,393 (Male−704 Female−689)
- Time zone: UTC+5:30 (IST)
- Postal code: 626612
- Language: Tamil

T.Velangudi is the village panchayat in Virudhunagar district in the state of Tamil Nadu, India. its belongs to Tiruchuli Taluk and Narikudi panchayat union. According to 2011 census No of People living here is 1393 (Male population 704 Female population 689). Agriculture is the main occupation for the majority of the people.

== School ==
Govt Middle School T.Velangudi With Govt Library.

== Hospital ==
Govt Primary Health Centre.

== Temples ==
- Veyil Ugantha Amman Temple
- Ariyana Swami Temple
- Ayyanar Temple
- Perumal Temple
