= Paavaali =

Paavaali is a village in Virudhunagar district. It is on the road from Virudhunagar to places like Sengunraapuram and Aerichchandam. It is on the west of Virudhunagar. This village was in great prosperity during the times of the Later Pandiyan Kingdom days between 12th and 13th centuries. This is discerned from a fragmentary inscription found here. This was known under this name since the Pandiyan Kingdom days. This was in the subdivision of Sengudi Nadu. There is a pottable well near the Paavaali lake. This well has been known at Pandiyan well. There was also a temple known as Thiruvaalisvaram Udaiyar temple. The Siva Brahmin priests - during the 3rd regnal year of Pandiyan King Sadaiyavarman Kulasekhara Pandiya - received an endowment from a merchant known as Karuppur Udaiyaan Thaevan Thiru who belonged to the foremost Tamil medieval merchant guild of Ainnurruvar.

Later during the rule of Madurai Naicker kings, this was one of the 72 Cantonments created by them for assistance during emergencies. The palace of the head of this cantonment is still found in a decadent condition. A copper plate inscription fixed on one of the pillars at the entrance of this palace, was issued by English East India Company's Major Bannerman. This was dated 21.11.1799 and issued a stern warning to the Chiefs of various cantonments and prohibited them from anti-government (Government of East India Company), raising armies or rioting. This was soon after the hanging of one of the Chiefs of that time named Veera Pandiya Kattabomman.

This above account is based on excerpts from - a Tamil book by epigraphists Sri P. Rajendran and Sri S. Santhalingam, published in June 2014 by Pandiyan Country Historical Research Centre, Madurai

Topic - History - Villages of Virudhunagar
