= Ganapathi Sundara Natciyar Puram =

Village in Virudhunagar district, Tamil Nadu, India

Ganapathi Sundara Natciyar Puram is a village in the Virudhunagar district in the Indian State of Tamil Nadu. It is located between the cities of Rajapalayam and Tenkasi on NH208 (National Highway). The economy is primarily based on agriculture.

== Education ==
There is an elementary school present here.

The village came into public view in the state when the son of an auto-rickshaw driver overcame financial difficulties and cracked the JEE exam in 2024 to go on to study at IIT Madras.
