= Krishnapuram, Virudhunagar district =

Krishnapuram Krishnapuram, Rajapalayam Krishnapuram (OP)
- village
- Location in Tamil Nadu, India Krishnapuram (India)
- Coordinates: 9°25′32″N 77°30′26″E
- Country: India
- State: Tamil Nadu
- District: Virudhunagar

Languages
  - Official: Tamil
- Time zone: UTC+5:30 (IST)
- PIN: 626143
- Nearest city: Rajapalayam
- Lok Sabha constituency: Tenkasi
- Vidhan Sabha constituency: Rajapalayam

Krishnapuram is a village in the Virudhunagar district in the state of Tamil Nadu, India. It is located on Kollam-Tirumangalam Road National Highways 744 and is about 7 km from Rajapalayam.

== Agriculture ==
Agriculture is the main occupation of the Krishnapuram people. Krishnapuram is bounded by farmlands and crop fields in all directions. Most of the farming includes coconut, paddy rice, mango, sugarcane, cotton, millet, root and tuber crops, maize, cucumber, pumpkin, and numerous fresh vegetables. There are no mango farms in Krishnapuram. Most of the farms are seen on the outskirts of the village and in the nearby Ayyanar Koil Forest Area or Western Ghats. As mango farming is a seasonal one, most of the village farmers are busy cultivating mango during the summer season. And the ripened mangoes are quite famous around the Krishnapuram locales.

Most of the irrigation processes are carried out in traditional ways. The sources of irrigation water are mostly wells, and in some cases, surface water is being pumped into the farmlands.

== Politics ==
Krishnapuram comes under Rajapalayam (State Assembly Constituency) and Tenkasi (Lok Sabha constituency) which is incumbent by Thanga Pandiyan (DMK) and Dr. Rani Srikumar (DMK) respectively.
