= R. Krishnasamy Naidu =

Indian politician (1902–1973)

Tamilnadu Congress Committee President
- In office 1962–1967
- Preceded by: O. V. Alagesan
- Succeeded by: Chidambaram Subramaniam

Personal details
- Born: 5 January 1902 P.Ramachandrapuram, Srivilliputhur, Tamil Nadu, India
- Died: 30 October 1973 (aged 72)
- Party: Indian National Congress
- Spouse: Andal
- Children: 8 (Son-4 -Daughter-4)

R. Krishnasamy Naidu (Tamil:ரா.கிருஷ்ணசாமி நாயுடு; 5 January 1902 – 30 October 1973) was an Indian politician and former Member of the Legislative Assembly Madras State Legislative Assembly (1952) and He was elected to the Tamil Nadu legislative assembly as an Indian National Congress candidate from Srivilliputhur constituency in 1957 election and from Rajapalayam constituency in 1962 election.

He was actively involved in social work and cooperative initiatives and was engaged in agriculture. He also had an interest in composing Tamil poetry, reading, and listening to Carnatic music.

Joined in the Indian National Congress in 1922.Underwent imprisonment for one year in 1930 during the Civil Disobedience Movement
