= P. Ramachandrapuram =

P.Ramachandrapuram Pudhuchennelkulam
- Village
- Location in Tamil Nadu, India P.Ramachandrapuram (India)
- Coordinates: 9.4398859°N 77.6403808°E
- Country: India
- State: Tamil Nadu
- District: Virudhunagar
- Named for: Well grown Paddy crops

Population (2001)
  - Total: 2,266

Languages
  - Official: Tamil
- Time zone: UTC+5:30 (IST)

P.Ramachandrapuram is a panchayat Village in Virudhunagar district in the Indian state of Tamil Nadu. P.Ramachandrapuram is also called as Pudhuchennelkulam. This village is under the control of Srivilliputhur Block.

== Geography ==
P.Ramachandrapuram is located at 9.4398859°N 77.6403808°E. It is located next to Chatrapatti.

== Politics ==
P.Ramachandrapuram moved to Srivilliputhur (State Assembly Constituency) & Tenkasi (Lok Sabha constituency) after 2009.

== Schools ==
R. Krishnasamy Primary School.

R. Krishnasamy Govt Hr Sec School.

== Notable personalities ==
- Freedom fighter R. Krishnasamy Naidu was an Indian politician and former Member of Madras State Legislative Assembly.
