= Virudhunagar taluk =

Coordinates: 9°35′N 77°57′E

Virudhunagar taluk is a taluk of Virudhunagar district of the Indian state of Tamil Nadu. The headquarters of the taluk is the town of Virudhunagar.

== Demographics ==
According to the 2011 census, the taluk of Virudhunagar had a population of 250,782 with 125,329 males and 125,453 females. There were 1,001 women for every 1,000 men. The taluk had a literacy rate of 76.08%. Child population in the age group below 6 years were 11,745 Males and 11,519 Females.
