= Kooraikundu =

- Panchayat town
- Location in Tamil Nadu, India
- Coordinates: 9°34′56″N 77°57′42″E
- Country: India
- State: Tamil Nadu
- District: Virudhunagar district

Population (2011)
  - Total: 22,361

Languages
  - Official: Tamil
- Time zone: UTC+5:30 (IST)

Kooraikundu is a panchayat town in Virudhunagar district in the state of Tamil Nadu, India.

== Geography ==
Kooraikundu lies in the southern part of Tamil Nadu and is administratively within Virudhunagar district.

== Demographics ==
=== 2011 ===
According to the 2011 Census (Virudhunagar panchayat union tables), Kooraikundu had a population of 22,361 (11,136 males and 11,225 females). The Scheduled Caste population was 3,366 (1,664 males and 1,702 females) and the Scheduled Tribe population was 34 (17 males and 17 females).

=== 2001 ===
As of 2001 India census, Kooraikundu had a population of 19,706. Males constituted 50% of the population and females 50%. Kooraikundu had an average literacy rate of 73%, higher than the national average of 59.5%: male literacy was 78%, and female literacy was 68%. In Kooraikundu, 12% of the population was under 6 years of age.

== Administration ==
Kooraikundu is governed as a panchayat town under Tamil Nadu’s local-body system.
