= Kulasekaranallur =

Village in Tamil Nadu, India

Kulasekaranallur is a village in Virudhunagar district in the Indian state of Tamil Nadu.
