= Anaiyur, Madurai =

Neighbourhood in Madurai district, Tamil Nadu, India

Anaiyur
- Village
- Anaiyur, Madurai (Tamil Nadu)
- Coordinates: 9°57′39.2″N 78°06′38.2″E
- Country: India
- State: Tamil Nadu
- District: Madurai
- Taluka: Madurai North
- Elevation: 164 m (538 ft)

Population (2011)
  - Total: 63,917

Languages
  - Official: Tamil
- Time zone: UTC+5:30 (IST)
- Postal code: 625 017

Anaiyur is an area of the Madurai district in the state of Tamil Nadu, India. As of 2011, the town had a population of 63,917.

== Demographics ==
Religious census
Religion	Percent(%)
Hindu	85.09%
Muslim	5.9%
Christian	8.81%
Sikh	0.01%
Jain	0.01%
Other	0.18%

According to 2011 census, Anaiyur had a population of 63,917 with a sex-ratio of 990 females for every 1,000 males, much above the national average of 929. A total of 6,166 were under the age of six, constituting 3,219 males and 2,947 females. Scheduled Castes and Scheduled Tribes accounted for 10.98% and 0.32% of the population respectively. The average literacy of the district was 82.83%, compared to the national average of 72.99%. The district had a total of 16,351 households. There were a total of 24,478 workers, comprising 354 cultivators, 839 main agricultural labourers, 426 in house hold industries, 20,906 other workers, 1,953 marginal workers, 31 marginal cultivators, 59 marginal agricultural labourers, 272 marginal workers in household industries and 1,591 other marginal workers.

As per the religious census of 2011, Anaiyur had 85.09% Hindus, 5.9% Muslims, 8.81% Christians, 0.01% Sikhs, 0.01% Jains and 0.18% following other religions.
