= Kullursandhai =

Kullursandhai is a village with a population of 5,383 persons according to 2011 Census, located in Virudhunagar district in the South Indian state of Tamil Nadu. Agriculture is a common revenue generator for the village. Kullursandhai is a village in the Aruppukkottai block of Virudhunagar district, Tamil Nadu. It falls under the Aruppukkottai Assembly and Virudhunagar Lok Sabha constituencies. Local facilities include schools such as S.V.V. High School, though no colleges, ATMs, banks, or public libraries are present in this area.
