= Kakkivadanpatti =

- village
- Location in Tamil Nadu, India
- Coordinates: 9.473709°N 77.839175°E
- Country: India
- State: Tamil Nadu
- District: Virudhunagar

Government
  - Panchayat President: Mrs.Amsavalli Damodaran

Languages
  - Official: Tamil
- Time zone: UTC+5:30 (IST)
- PIN: 626124
- Telephone code: +91 4562
- Vehicle registration: TN 67 TN 84

Kakkivadanpatti is a small village in Virudhunagar district, Tamil Nadu, India, near Sivakasi. Most of the population are farmers and speak both Tamil and Telugu.

== Facilities ==
- Post Office kakkivadanpatti 626124
- BSNL Exchange Kakkivadanpatti

== Education ==
- R. Ponnuchamy Naidu Middle school Kakkivadanpatti

== Adjacent communities ==
It is surrounded by other villages like Maraneri, Mamsapuram, Kallamanaiackanpatti and towns Sivakasi and Alangulum.
