= Kurandi =

Village in Tamil Nadu, India

Coordinates: 15°18′N 74°32′E

Kurandi is a village in Tamil Nadu, in southern India.
