= Keelakurunaikulam =

- Village
- Location in Tamil Nadu, India Keelakurunaikulam (India)
- Coordinates: 9.490376°N 78.171844°E
- Country: India
- State: Tamil Nadu
- District: Virudhunagar

Languages
  - Official: Tamil
- Time zone: UTC+5:30 (IST)
- PIN: 626105
- Telephone code: 04566

Keelakurunaikulam is a village in Virudhunagar district in the Indian state of Tamil Nadu. Keelakurunaikulam is about 11 km from Aruppukottai nearest town and famous for cultivation of jasmines.
