= Rosalpatti =

- Town
- Location in Tamil Nadu, India
- Coordinates: 9°35′07″N 77°58′24″E
- Country: India
- State: Tamil Nadu
- District: Virudhunagar

Population (2001)
  - Total: 19,155

Languages
  - Official: Tamil
- Time zone: UTC+5:30 (IST)

Rosalpatti is a panchayat town in Virudhunagar district in the Indian state of Tamil Nadu.

== Demographics ==
As of 2001 India census, Rosalpatti had a population of 19,155. Males constitute 51% of the population and females 49%. Rosalpatti has an average literacy rate of 72%, higher than the national average of 59.5%: male literacy is 79%, and female literacy is 64%. In Rosalpatti, 12% of the population is under 6 years of age.
