= Poolangal =

Poolangal poovai
- village
- Nickname: poovai
- Country: India
- State: Tamil Nadu
- District: Virudhunagar

Population (2015)
  - Total: 5,900

Languages
  - Official: Tamil
- Time zone: UTC+5:30 (IST)
- PIN: 626114
- Nearest city: Madurai

Poolangal is a village in the Virudhunagar district in the Indian state of Tamil Nadu.

== Schools ==
- Panchayat Union Primary School
- Government Higher secondary School

== Transport ==
Bus route A34 connects Poolangal to the town of Aruppukottai.
