= Amanakkunattnam =

- Village
- Country: India
- State: Tamil Nadu
- District: Virudhunagar district
- Elevation: 103 m (338 ft)

Languages
  - Official: Tamil
- Time zone: UTC+5:30 (IST)
- Telephone code: 04566
- Nearest city: Aruppukkottai

Amanakkunattnam is a village located in Aruppukottai Taluk, Virudhunagar district, Tamil Nadu, India.
