= Varalotti =

Village in India

Coordinates: 9°36′N 78°01′E

Varalotti is a village of the Virudhunagar district in Tamil Nadu, India. Varalotti is situated 12 km east of the Virudhunagar district headquarters and 14 km from Kariapatti. It lies approximately 533 km from the state capital, Chennai. By the way, Nearby railway station of Varalotti is Virudhunagar railway station.

The nearest cities to Varalotti are Valukkalotti (3 km), Palavanatham (5 km), Rosalpatti (6 km), and Thanga Mani Colony (6 km). Varalotti is bordered by Aruppukottai Block to the south, Kallikudi Block to the north, Kariapatti Block to the east, and T. Kallupatti Block to the west.

Geographically, Varalotti is located near the border of Virudhunagar District and Madurai District, with Kallikudi in Madurai District lying to its north.
