= Duraisamypuram =

Duraisamyapuram
- village
- Location in Tamil Nadu, India Duraisamyapuram (India)
- Coordinates: 9°3′58″N 77°27′06″E
- Country: India
- State: Tamil Nadu

Languages
  - Official: Tamil
- Time zone: UTC+5:30 (IST)
- Postal code: 627862

Duraisamypuram is a village in the Tenkasi district of Tamil Nadu. It is located between the towns of Sankarankovil and Surandai.
