= Natham Patti =

Natham Patti (Ayyan) Natham Patti
- village
- Location in Tamil Nadu, India Natham Patti (India)
- Coordinates: 9°36′00″N 77°43′44″E
- Country: India
- State: Tamil Nadu
- District: Virudhunagar

Languages
  - Official: Tamil
- Time zone: UTC+5:30 (IST)
- PIN: 626138
- Telephone code: 04563
- Vehicle registration: TN 67
- Nearest city: Madurai
- Lok Sabha constituency: Virudhunagar
- Vidhan Sabha constituency: Srivilliputhur

Natham Patti is a village in Srivilliputhur taluk, Virudhunagar district in the Indian state of Tamil Nadu. It is on National Highway 208, about 58 km south-west of Madurai and well connected by road with Madurai, Tenkasi. It has more than 1000 families.

Natham Patti is near Srivilliputtur (15 km) and Madurai (50 km).

== Institutions ==
The village has a branch library. It also has R.C. High School and St. Xavier's Church.

== Climate ==
Temperature range is 20 °C to 37 °C.It has a high mean temperature and a low degree of humidity. The climate of the village ranges from dry sub-humid to semi-arid. The village has three distinct periods of rainfall: (1) Advancing monsoon period, South West monsoon (from June to September), with strong southwest winds; (2) North East monsoon (from October to December), with dominant northeast winds; and (3) Dry season (from January to May).
