= Melathulukkankulam =

Village in Tamil Nadu, India

Melathulukkankulam is a village in the Virudhunagar district under Kariapatti taluk, in Tamil Nadu, India. It is exactly 3 kilometres (1.9 mi) from the Virudhunagar-Kalkurichi main road. It has its own post office and the PINCODE is 626109. The nearest town is Virudhunagar, 11 kilometres (6.8 mi) away. Agriculture is the main source of income for the residents the village. The village has its own government middle school and for secondary education government and government-aided high schools are located in Mallankinaru, around 5 kilometres (3.1 mi). The village is under the control of Mallankinaru police station.
