= Muthalnaickenpatti =

- Village
- Location within Tamil Nadu
- Coordinates: 9.387386°N 77.877268°E
- Country: India
- State: Tamil Nadu
- District: Virudhunagar

Muthalnaickenpatti is a small village in the Sattur Block of Virudhunagar district in the Indian state of Tamil Nadu. This village is located between Sattur and Sivakasi.

== Geography ==
The climate is usually hot, with rains during September - November. Temperatures during summer reach a maximum of 35 and a minimum of 25 degrees Celsius. Winter temperatures range between 25 and 19 degrees Celsius. The average annual rainfall is about 75 cm.
