= Saminathapuram =

- village
- Country: India
- State: Tamil Nadu
- District: Virudhunagar

Population
  - Total: 1,500

Languages
  - Official: Tamil, Telugu
- Time zone: UTC+5:30 (IST)
- PIN: 626136
- Telephone code: 04563
- Vehicle registration: TN-84
- Nearest city: Rajapalayam
- Lok Sabha constituency: sivakasi

Saminathapuram is a village in Virudhunagar district in the Indian state of Tamil Nadu. It is located 95 km southwest of Madurai in the state of Tamil Nadu. Its main attractions are the Ayyanar kovil and the Chettiar bungalow and the every year village festival. The economy is based on the agriculture and match works industry.
