= Kalloorani =

Coordinates: 9.4682941°N 78.1635101°E

Kalloorani is a village Panchayat in Virudhunagar district, 10 km southeast of Aruppukkottai, Tamil Nadu.

== Name ==
Kalloorani was earlier named as Thennagaiyur (தென்னாகையூர்) by the Pandyas. Later renamed as Kalloorani(கல்லூரணி) due to the water resources like ponds and wells.

== Facilities ==
Important buildings are the Kalloorani Sub Post Office, a branch of the Tamilnad Mercantile Bank, a Government Library and also the government hospital.

== Education ==
SBK Higher Secondary School is located here.
