= Appayanaickenpatti =

Coordinates: 9.29154678°N 77.679533°E

Appayanaickenpatti is a village panchayat located in Virudhunagar taluk in Virudhunagar district of the Indian state of Tamil Nadu.
