= Koppuchithampatti =

Village in Tamil Nadu

Koppuchithampatti is a village panchayat in Aruppukkottai taluk, Virudhunagar district, Tamil Nadu, India.

Koppuchithampatti is located 5.5 kilometers east from National Highway 45B at Pandal Gudi junction. Transport facilities are available from Aruppukottai.

Koppuchithampatti has been physically divided into 4 wards as North, East, South and West. The East ward of Koppuchithampatti is about 1 kilometer other three wards.

It has a Government run Hospital Building, the medical staff will visit from near by Primary health center Pandal gudi. There is a small library that is open for limited hours.

Koppuchithampatti is an agricultural village. Apart from agriculture, most young people working in gulf countries.

== Education ==
There is a Government middle school in Koppuchithampatti near east ward. One more CSI Primary School is function in south ward.
