= Mallipudur =

Mallipudur is a village near Srivilliputtur, Tamil Nadu, India.
