= Sithurajapuram =

- Sivakasi Municipal Corporation
- Location in Tamil Nadu, India
- Coordinates: 9°25′19″N 77°48′37″E
- Country: India
- State: Tamil Nadu
- District: Sivakasi

Government
  - Panjayat President: Leelavathy suburaj

Population (2001)
  - Total: 12,933

Languages
  - Official: Tamil
- Time zone: UTC+5:30 (IST)
- PIN: 626189
- Telephone code: 04562
- Vehicle registration: TN95

Sithurajapuram is an area of Sivakasi Corporation in Virudhunagar district in the Indian state of Tamil Nadu. There is a phc in sithurajapuram run by the government of Tamil Nadu.

== Demographics ==
As of 2001 India census, Sithurajapuram had a population of 12,933. Males constitute 50% of the population and females 50%. Sithurajapuram has an average literacy rate of 73%, higher than the national average of 59.5%: male literacy is 79%, and female literacy is 66%. In Sithurajapuram, 11% of the population is under 6 years of age.
