= Dhalavaipuram =

- town
- Location in Tamil Nadu, India
- Coordinates: 9.40°N 77.55°E
- Country: India
- State: Tamil Nadu
- District: Virudhunagar

Area
  - Total: 11 km^{2} (4.2 sq mi)
- Elevation: 100.58 m (330.0 ft)

Population (2001)
  - Total: 5,371
  - Density: 490/km^{2} (1,300/sq mi)

Languages
  - Official: Tamil
- Time zone: UTC+5:30 (IST)

Dhalavaipuram or Dhalavoipuram is a town in Rajapalayam Virudhunagar district in the Indian state of Tamil Nadu. It is located 105 km southwest of Madurai in the state of Tamil Nadu. The economy is based on the manufacture of Garments, cotton sarees, lungis, Nighties, Inskirt, Brassiere and there are mills for spinning and weaving cotton.

== Demographics ==
As of 2001 India census, Dhalavaipuram had a population of 5371. Males constitute 50% of the population and females 50%. Dhalavaipuram has an average literacy rate of 71%, higher than the national average of 59.5%: male literacy is 78% and, female literacy is 65%. In Dhalavaipuram, 11% of the population is under six years of age.

== Climate ==
The climate of the region is semi-arid tropical monsoon type. Temperature range is 20°C to 37°C. It has a high mean temperature and a low degree of humidity. April, May and June are the hottest months of the year. The southwest monsoon which sets in June and lasts till August brings scanty rain. The bulk of the rainfall is received during the northeast monsoon in the months of October, November and December.

== Education ==
Members of the Nadar community in southern Tamil Nadu established Nadar Uravinmurai committees and founded schools for boys and girls, including institutions intended to provide education to students from families with limited financial means. Dhalavaipuram has several matriculation schools, while some students attend schools in nearby Rajapalayam for additional educational options.

The following are the schools in Dhalavaipuram

- T.N.P.M. Marimuthu Nadar Boys Hr. Sec. school
- T.N.P.M.M. Ammayappa Nadar Girls Hr. Sec school
- Annai Vidyalaya
- Perun Thalaivar Kamarajar Matric Hr. Sec. School
- St. Antonys Matriculation School
- mahatma gandhi school

Students from Dhalavaipuram move onto colleges in cities like Chennai, Madurai, Coimbatore and other colleges nearby.

== Tourist attractions ==
=== Ayyanar Koil (Ayyanar Falls) ===
Ayyanar Falls is located on the slope of Western Ghats, It has waterfalls and a temple. It provides good opportunity for woodland mountain climbing. Dam is situated on the way to Ayyanar Falls which is providing water for the whole city.

=== Sanjeevi Hills ===
Sanjeevi Hills is situated in Rajapalayam on the way to Chatrapatti. The calm and serene ambiance makes it a favorite spot for tourists. Tradition recounts that in order to save the unconscious Lakshmana, Hanuman, the monkey god carried the entire Sanjeevi Hill with the herbal plants to Sri Lanka and threw it away afterward. It is said that the thrown down hill is the Sanjeevi Hills.

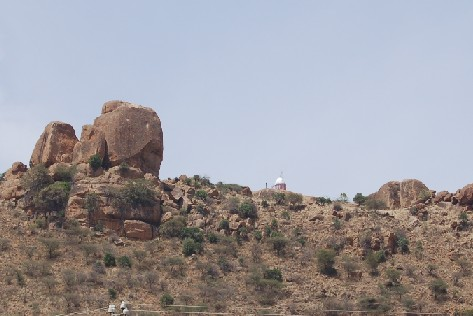
Sanjeevi Hill

=== Srivilliputtur Shenbagathope Grizzled Squirrel Sanctuary ===
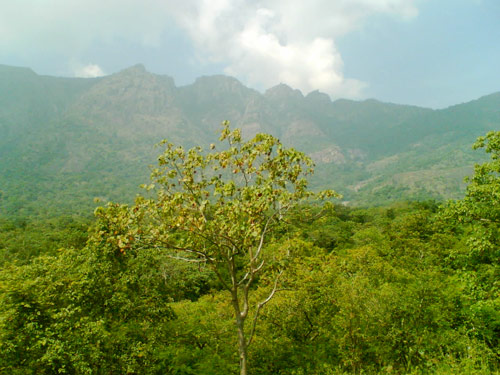
Shenbagathoppu is a place like Ooty for the locals here. The calm and serene ambiance makes it a favorite spot for tourists.

Shenbaga Thoppu, a forest area about 8 km west from Srivilliputtur is a very good option for trekking. There is no proper bus service to reach here though. However, the place can be reached by two-wheeler or even cycle.

The forests are found on the eastern slopes of the Western Ghats. Only 6.3% of the total geographical area is under forests. Many rare and endemic varieties of flora and fauna are found along the mountain slopes.

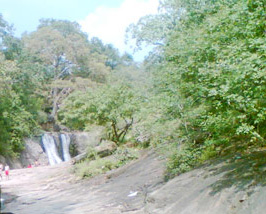
Meenvetti Parai Falls - Nice place to visit during winter and rainy seasons

A wildlife sanctuary, spread over 480 square kilometres was established in 1989 at Shenbagathopu in Srivilliputtur taluk. This sanctuary is contiguous with the Periyar tiger reserve on the south-western side and the Megamalai reserve forest on the north-western side. The altitude varies from 100 to 2010 m above sea level. The sanctuary is home to the endangered, arboreal Grizzled Giant Squirrel (Ratufa macrora).

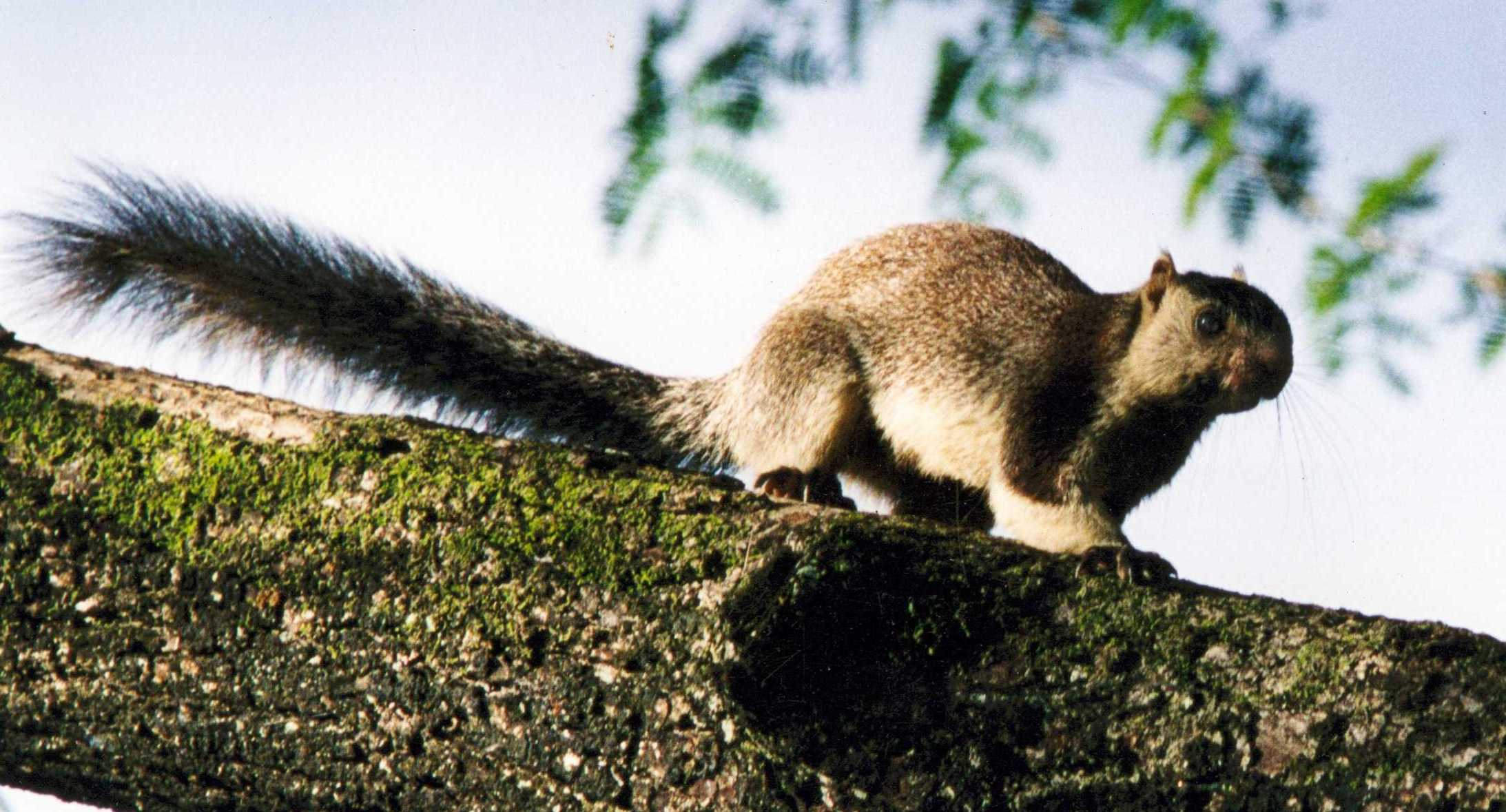
Grizzled Squirrel

This greyish brown squirrel weighs 1 to 1.8 kg and is the size of a small cat. It measures about 735 mm from nose to tail with the tail being 360 to 400 mm long. They construct drays at forked branches where the crowns of neighbouring trees meet. This enables the squirrel to move away from the site by jumping from tree to tree when threatened. The home range of an individual is between 1,970 and 6,110 square metres.

The sanctuary also hosts a variety of birds, mammals, reptiles and butterflies. Resident and migratory elephants are common. Other animals sighted are tiger, leopard, Nilgiri thar, spotted deer, barking deer, sambar, wild boar, porcupine, Nilgiri langur, lion-tailed macaque, common langur, slender loris, bonnet macaque, sloth bear and flying squirrel. Over 100 species of birds have been identified. The rare Great Indian horn bill is also found.

Special steps have been taken to conserve the forest areas in the sanctuary. The annual leases given for the collection of fruit and other minor forest produce has been stopped. Fruit bearing trees and other trees have been planted. This will increase the food sources as well as ensure continuity in the canopy. Soil conservation and water harvesting measures have been undertaken to improve the habitat.

There are some waterfalls on the way and people from surrounding areas will gather here during the winter and rainy seasons. The river and water falls (Meenvetti Parai) are well known. Many people visit everyday from Srivilliputtur, Rajapalayam and Sivakasi regularly. This place is shelter for many tribal communities.
