= Thayilpatti =

- Town
- Location in Tamil Nadu, India
- Coordinates: 9°23′14″N 77°47′30″E
- Country: India
- State: Tamil Nadu
- District: Virudhunagar

Population (2001)
  - Total: 19,200

Languages
  - Official: Tamil
- Time zone: UTC+5:30 (IST)

Thayilpatty is a Panchayat town in Virudhunagar District in the State of Tamil Nadu in India.

== Demographics ==
As of 2001 India census, Thayilpatti had a population of 10,000 & above. Males constitute 49% of the population and females 51%. Thayilpatti has an average literacy rate of 62%, higher than the national average of 59.5%: male literacy is 72%, and female literacy is 52%. In Thayilpatti, 12% of the population is under 6 years of age.

== Economy ==
The Thayilpatti Village is near Sivakasi, a prominent place of manufacturing for matches, printing and firecrackers. It is one of the main places for exporting firecrackers.
