= Sengamalapatti =

Village in Tamil Nadu, India

Sengamalapatti is a village panchayat located in the Virudhunagar district of Tamil Nadu, India.
