= Viswanatham =

Coordinates: 9°26′15″N 77°48′50″E

- town
- Interactive map of Viswanatham
- Country: India
- State: Tamil Nadu
- District: Virudhunagar

Population (2011)
  - Total: 25,555

Languages
  - Official: Tamil
- Time zone: UTC+5:30 (IST)

Viswanatham is a panchayat town in Virudhunagar district in the Indian state of Tamil Nadu.

== Demographics ==
As of 2001 India census, Viswanatham had a population of 22,121. Males constitute 50% of the population and females 50%. Viswanatham has an average literacy rate of 60%, higher than the national average of 59.5%: male literacy is 69%, and female literacy is 51%. In Viswanatham, 15% of the population is under 6 years of age.
