= Naranapuram =

- Town
- Location in Tamil Nadu, India
- Coordinates: 9°25′51″N 77°50′04″E
- Country: India
- State: Tamil Nadu
- District: Virudhunagar

Government
  - Type: Grade one Panchayat village
  - Body: Panchayati raj
  - Panchayat president: Special officer(BDO)

Population (2020)
  - Total: 18,400

Languages
  - Official: Tamil
- Time zone: UTC+5:30 (IST)
- Postal code: 626189

Naranapuram is a panchayat town in Virudhunagar district in the Indian state of Tamil Nadu.

== Demographics ==
As of 2001 India census, Naranapuram had a population of 9342. Males constitute 49% of the population and females 51%. Naranapuram has an average literacy rate of 63%, higher than the national average of 59.5%: male literacy is 73%, and female literacy is 55%. In Naranapuram, 13% of the population is under 6 years
