= Elayirampannai =

- town
- Location in Tamil Nadu, India
- Coordinates: 9.27°N 77.83°E
- Country: India
- State: Tamil Nadu
- District: Virudhunagar
- Elevation: 101 m (331 ft)

Population (2001)
  - Total: 6,354

Languages
  - Official: Tamil
- Time zone: UTC+5:30 (IST)
- Postal code: 626201

Elayirampannai is a panchayat town in Virudhunagar district in the state of Tamil Nadu, India. The economy of the town is based on manufacturing safety matches, crackers and agriculture.

== Overview ==
Elayirampannai (Tamil:ஏழாயிரம்பண்ணை) has a history of more than 350 years. Once it was ruled by Zamindars who were palayakarars before the British rule. Even today the descendants of Jaminthars are living in Elayirampannai.

== Demographics ==
As of 2001 census, Elayirampannai had a population of 6,354. Males constitute 48% of the population and females 52%. Elayirampannai has an average literacy rate of 62%, higher than the national average of 59.5%: male literacy is 72%, and female literacy is 52%. In Elayirampannai, 11% of the population is under 6 years of age.

== Facilities ==
Government Hospital

== Economy ==
The main business here is Agriculture and Safety Matches. Elayirampannai is a hub for Wax Safety matches in India. Many MSME Safety matches units engaged in production of Wax Safety matches.

== Transport ==
Bus Available from/to Sattur, Kovilpatti, Sankarankoil, Vembakottai

Nearest Railway Stations are Kovilpatti railway station (10 km) and Sattur(15 km)

== Education ==
Schools:

- A Government aided Higher Secondary School under the management of Nadars, which was founded by some elders of Nadar community.
- A school run by the local church.
- An English medium school run by Thiru. Rajendran.
