= Watrap block =

Coordinates: 9°38′14″N 77°38′01″E

Watrap block is a revenue block in the Virudhunagar district of Tamil Nadu, India. It has a total of 27 panchayat villages.
