= Velliahpuram =

Vellaiahpuram is a village in Ramanathapuram, Tamil Nadu, India.
