= Lakshminarayanapuram =

Lakshminarayana Puram is a village in Attili mandal, West Godavari district of the Indian state of Andhra Pradesh. Lakshminarayanapuram ( LKSH ) has its own train station connecting major cities.

Lakshminarayana Puram pin code is 534209 and postal head office is at Mogallu. Lakshminarayana Puram is surrounded by Veeravasaram Mandal towards East, Attili Mandal towards North, Penumantra Mandal towards East and Bhimavaram Mandal towards West.
