= Zaminsalwarpatti =

Coordinates: 9.4572135°N 77.8546545°E

Zamin Salwarpatti (Jameen Salvarpatti, Salvarpatti) is a village located near Sivakasi, in Virudhunagar district in the Indian state of Tamil Nadu. M. Karuppasamy is the panchayat president of the village. The village is known for firecrackers and match factories that produce 20% total production from Virudhunagar district (Sivakasi). The industries in Jameen salvarpatti employ over 2,000 people and the estimated turnover is around INR 10 million (2016). This village connects Sivakasi in the west and NH 44 in the east. The literacy rate is 40%. The major issues in the village are the frequent accidents in the firecracker factories, high humidity (because of factories like cement, fire etc.) and water scarcity due to poor rainfall.

Temples in Jameen Salvarpatti are Arulmigu Sri Sakthi Vinayagar Thirukovil, Akkamma Kovil, Devandran Kaliyamman Temple, Devandran Pillaiyar Kovil, Chennandi Malai Swamy.
