= Pallimadam =

Village in Tamil Nadu, India

Coordinates: 9°32′8″N 78°12′32″E

Pallimadam or Pallipadi is a village situated on the outskirts of Tiruchuli in Virudhunagar district, Tamil Nadu, India on the eastern bank of the river Gundar.

== History ==
Sundara Pandya, a 10th-century AD Pandya ruler, famous for his erudition, died while visiting Pallimadam. He was buried there and his younger brother Vira Pandya (AD 946–966) erected a sepulchral shrine (pallipadai) over his grave. The temple was known as Pallippadai Sundara Pandya Isvaramudayar koil. It is now called Kalainathaswamy koil. The name Pallippadai has over the years been corrupted to Pallimadam. This sepulchral temple is the only one of its kind in Pandya nadu.

== Kalainathaswamy Kovil ==
Kalainathaswamy Temple is located at Pallimadam, Virudhunagar District, on the banks of the Gundar River. Vira Pandya had built this sepulchral shrine (Pallipadai) at Pallimadam for his brother Sundara Pandya, a famous Pandya ruler. This shrine was earlier known as Pallippadai Sundara Pandya Isvaramudayar Kovil, now it is called Kalainathaswamy Kovil. It is a unique sepulchral temple of its kind in Pandya Nadu. Nearby attractions include Bhuminathaswamy Temple and Ramana Maharshi Ashram.
