= Maraneri =

- village
- Location within Tamil Nadu Location within India
- Coordinates: 10°47′22″N 78°58′45″E
- Country: India
- State: Tamil Nadu
- District: Thanjavur
- Taluk: Thanjavur

Population (2001)
  - Total: 1,753

Languages
  - Official: Tamil
- Time zone: UTC+5:30 (IST)
- PIN: 613102
- Vehicle registration: TN 49

Maraneri is a village in the Thanjavur Taluk of Thanjavur district, Tamil Nadu, India.

== Demographics ==
As per the 2001 census, Maraneri had a total population of 4,500 with 873 males and 880 females. The sex ratio was 1008. The literacy rate was 79.22.
