= Kanjampatti =

- village
- Location in Tamil Nadu, India
- Coordinates: 9.3644°N 78.2057°E
- Country: India
- State: Tamil Nadu
- District: Virudunagar

Languages
  - Official: Tamil
- Time zone: UTC+5:30 (IST)

Kanjampatti is a village in Virudhunagar District, Tamil Nadu, India. In the 2011 census it had a population of 1839 in 542 households. It is south of Aruppukkottai. The village has big reservoir (Kanmai) and vast paddy lands.

== Economy ==
The village depends upon agriculture, cattle and goats for income. Most of the village residents migrated to populated cities and towns for industrial and government jobs.

== Transport ==
Transportation is available from Aruppukkattai a few times a day and is about 45 minutes by public transportation.
