= Pudupatti, Virudhunagar =

Pudupatti
- village
- Location in Tamil Nadu, India
- Coordinates: 9.439431°N 77.97155°E
- Country: India
- State: Tamil Nadu
- District: Virudhunagar

Population (2001)
  - Total: 7,846

Languages
  - Official: Tamil
- Time zone: UTC+5:30 (IST)

Pudupatti is a panchayat town in Virudhunagar district in the Indian state of Tamil Nadu.

== Geography ==
A.Pudupatti is a village located down south of India in Tamil Nadu state. It is located 20 km (12 mi) away from the district capital Virudhunagar.

The initial ‘A’ implies from neighboring village ‘Appayanayakkan patti’ just to get differentiated from many other Pudupatties in the state.

== Education ==
The town has ‘Panchayat Union Middle School’ and 'Kamrajar aramba padasalai' in Pudupatti and ‘Government Higher Secondary School’ in neighboring village Veerarpatti.

== Economy ==
Pudupatti is basically an agriculture based village. As it happened to many other villages in the state (as rainfall had dropped too low), people who were dependent on agriculture had migrated to other places for their survival.

== Demographics ==
As of 2001 India census, Pudupatti had a population of 7846. Males constitute 49% of the population and females 51%. Pudupatti has an average literacy rate of 60%, higher than the national average of 59.5%: male literacy is 70%, and female literacy is 50%. In Pudupatti, 12% of the population is under 6 years of age.
