= Anaiyur, Virudhunagar =

Anaiyur
- city
- Location in Tamil Nadu, India
- Coordinates: 9°25′28″N 77°47′23″E
- Country: India
- State: Tamil Nadu
- District: Virudhunagar

Government
  - Type: SIVAKASI CITY MUNICIPAL CORPORATION
  - Body: MUNICIPAL CORPORATION

Population (2001)
  - Total: 19,847

Languages
  - Official: Tamil
- Time zone: UTC+5:30 (IST)
- Postal code: 626124
- Vehicle registration: TN 95

Anaiyur is a part of Sivakasi city. It was once a panchayat town in Sivakasi block of Virudhunagar district. The town of anaiyur is soon to be integrated with new Sivakasi city municipal corporation.

It includes the residential areas like Reserveline, Anaiyur, Indira Nagar and Bharathi Nagar.

The Sivakasi industrial estate which was initiated in yearly 1950's is situated here.

== Demographics ==
As of 2001 India census, Anaiyur had a population of 19,847. Males constituted 50% of the population and females 50%.

== Transport ==
Anaiyur is situated in the main area of Sivakasi-Srivilliputhur Highway (state highways-42 SH 42). There is no bus stand in Anaiyur. The nearest bus stand is Sivakasi bus stand located at a distance of 5.7 km. Another bus stand is located at Thiruthangal at a distance of 7 to 8 km.

Railway Station: 1. Sivakasi railway station (2 to 3 km) 2. Thiruthangal railway station (7 to 8 km)

== Schools ==
The government higher secondary school and SCMS school are located in Anaiyur to meet the educational needs.

Some private schools are also located here to cater the educational needs of the town.
