= Vilampatti =

Vilampatti Vilavainagar
- Village
- Interactive map of Vilampatti
- Coordinates: 9°26′03″N 77°44′54″E
- Country: India
- State: Tamil Nadu
- District: Virudhunagar

Population
  - Total: 3,000

Languages
  - Official: Tamil
- Time zone: UTC+5:30 (IST)
- PIN: 626124
- Nearest city: Sivakasi

Vilampatti is a small village located in the Virudhunagar district, Tamil Nadu, India. It is located 6.7 kilometres west from Sivakasi. The total population is estimated to be around 3000.

Key establishments in Vilampatti are schools, Hindu temples, match factories and fireworks depots. The main source of livelihood of the people of Vilampatti is agriculture. The schools established in the village are Nadar George Primary School, A.V.M. MariMuthu Nadar Higher Secondary School, and Periya Karuppa Nadar Thillaiyammal Matriculation. There are four famous temples - Vilampatti Kali Amman Temple, Perumal koil, Sri Pavoor Vinayagar Temple, and Mariamman Temple. Aadi Perukku is a famous south Indian festival that is celebrated in the village.
