= Chatrapatti =

Village in Tamil Nadu, India

- Village
- Official Name: R. Chatrapatti
- Interactive map of Chatrapatti
- Coordinates: 9.415278°N 77.595041°E

Government
  - Type: Panchayath
- Elevation: 175 m (574 ft)
- Time zone: IST (UTC+05:30)
- Postal code: Pin Code - 626102
- Area code: STD Code : 04563
- Vehicle registration: TN - 67,84

Chatrapatti is a village in Rajapalayam Taluk in Virudhunagar District of Tamil Nadu State, India and it is located 50 km southwest of district headquarters Virudhunagar and 581 km towards south direction from State capital Chennai.

== History ==
Rani Mangammal (ruled 1689–1704) was the 11th ruler of the Madurai Nayaka dynasty. She was a renowned queen in developing infrastructure such as roads, walkways, passenger rest houses, irrigation and gardens for small and remote villages far from the capital city of Madurai. Rani Mangammal was an accomplished and popular ruler, and her memory is still cherished in the countryside of the district. Mangammal specializes in civil administration, commerce and industry, irrigation and communications.

Many irrigation channels were repaired, new roads were laid, and avenue trees were planted. The highway from Kanyakumari was originally built during the reign of Rani Mangammal, which was called 'Mangammal Road'. She also built many public works, especially for pilgrims.

== Climate ==
The village is a region of extreme heat and low humidity. The north east monsoon provides the bulk of rainfall during the months of October and November. Again the north east monsoon, which starts in June and lasting until mid August (Courtallam Season), provides showers and makes the region relatively cooler than in other months.

== Places ==
There is a huge bazaar in Middle street which remains crowded in the evening as this place is the biggest marketplace east of Rajapalayam and there are two water storage dams namely 'vagaikulam' and 'kanakulam'.

== Culture ==
Mulaikottu is the famous festival in Chatrapatti. This festival is celebrated every year, second week of August. This festival is common in several other parts of Tamil Nadu. The festival will be celebrated from Tuesday midnight to Friday before noon. all three days the Goddess Mariamman will be in chariot (Sapparam) at night in all the streets. this is the largest festival of this surrounding.

The Second important festival is Thai Poosam

Vaikasi Visagam is also celebrated .

== Transport ==
The Mangammal road which now passes through the village of Chatrapatti is called "Vanniyampatti" road. The 14 km long road connects the village of Chatrapatti to Srivilliputhur in the north and Mudukudi / Cholapuram in the south. This is the shortest route from Srivilliputhur to reach Sankarankovil/ Karivalamavantanallur. On the road was a Soultry (traveler's resting place - in Tamil it is called Chatra). The village derives its name from the Tamil word "Sathram" (a traveler's resting place) and "Patti" (suffix for a village).

Nearest Railway Station: Rajapalayam (8 km)

Nearby Airports: Madurai (85 km) and Thiruvananthapuram (176 km)

== Education ==
The village people give a lot of importance to education.

Two government schools, two matriculation school and elementary schools and one CBSE school here are as follows:-

- Vinayagar Elementary School (The school has celebrated its platinum jubilee)
- Government Higher Secondary School (A centenary school - A number of educated people in and around Chattrapatti are alumni of this school)
- arumugam palaniguru modern school

The government's schools higher secondary school two in numbers one for boys and other one for girls. The medium of instruction is Tamil. People go to Rajapalayam for English Medium Schools.
