= Alamarathupatti =

Alamarathupatti ஆலமரத்துப்பட்டி
- village
- Location in Tamil Nadu, India Alamarathupatti (India)
- Coordinates: 9.473709°N 77.839175°E
- Country: India
- State: Tamil Nadu
- District: Virudhunagar

Government
  - Panchayat President: Mr.P. Mahalingam

Languages
  - Official: Tamil
- Time zone: UTC+5:30 (IST)
- PIN: 626130
- Telephone code: 91 4562
- Vehicle registration: TN 67

Alamarathupatti is a village and panchayat in Sivakasi block, Virudhunagar district, Tamil Nadu.

== Locatlity ==
Alamarathupatti is surrounded by other villages like Sengamalapatti, Naranapuram, Chellaiyanaiyakanpatti and is close to the towns of Thiruthangal (4 km away) and Sivakasi (6 km away). The road to Alamarathupatti from Sivakasi is home to many firecracker factories.

== Notable persons ==
J. Balagangadharan, the former member of the Tamil Nadu Legislative Assembly, is from the village.

== Amenities ==
The village has a primary school, PUPS Alamarathupatti

== Culture and history ==
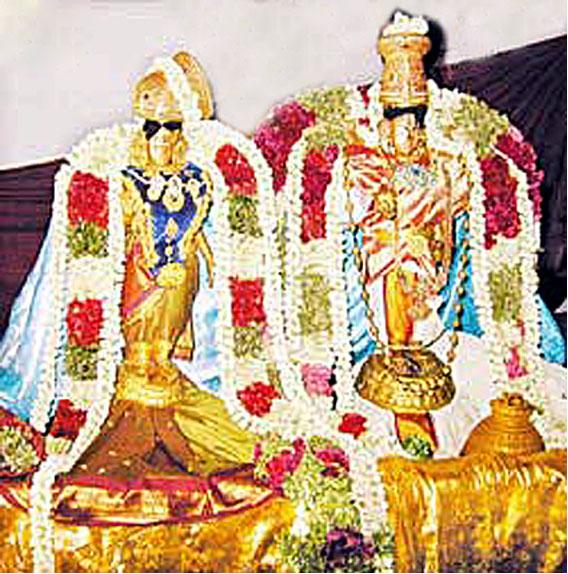
Lord Narayana and Nachiyar in the village during the festival

Each April the village has a festival in which residents carry idols of Narayana and Nachiyar on palanquins from the town of Thiruthangal. Many people from this village participated in the Indian independence movement.
