= Pallapatti, Virudhunagar =

Pallapatti
- Town
- Location in Tamil Nadu, India
- Coordinates: 9°27′59″N 77°49′19″E
- Country: India
- State: Tamil Nadu
- District: Virudhunagar

Population (2001)
  - Total: 24,319

Languages
  - Official: Tamil
- Time zone: UTC+5:30 (IST)

Pallapatti is a panchayat town in Virudhunagar district in the Indian state of Tamil Nadu.

== Demographics ==
In the 2001 Indian census, Pallapatti had a population of 24,319; of this males and females were each 50%. Pallapatti has an average literacy rate of 68%, higher than the national average of 59.5%: male literacy is 76%, and female literacy is 61%. In Pallapatti, 13% of the population is under 6 years of age.
