= Virudhunagar =

Town in Tamil Nadu, India

- Town
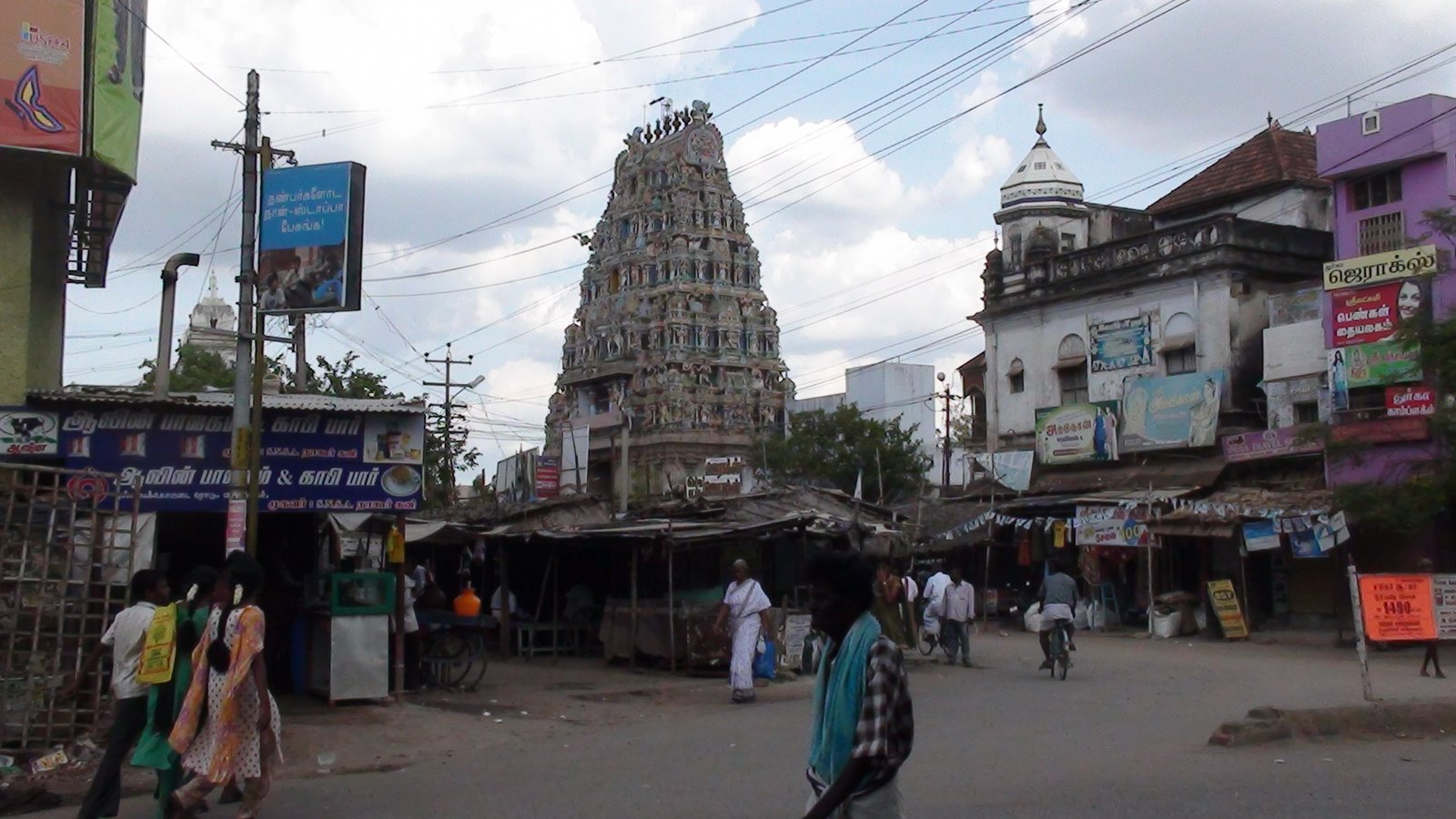

- Virudhunagar, Tamil Nadu
- Coordinates: 9°34′04.8″N 77°57′44.6″E
- Country: India
- State: Tamil Nadu
- District: Virudhunagar
- Revenue Division: Aruppukkottai
- Taluk: Virudhunagar

Government
  - Type: Selection Grade Municipality
  - Body: Virudhunagar municipality

Area
  - Total: 6.39 km^{2} (2.47 sq mi)
- Elevation: 120 m (390 ft)

Population (2011)
  - Total: 72,296
  - Density: 11,300/km^{2} (29,300/sq mi)

Languages
  - Official: Tamil
- Time zone: UTC+5:30 (IST)
- PIN: 626 001
- Telephone code: 04562
- Vehicle registration: TN-67

Virudhunagar is a Town and the administrative headquarters of Virudhunagar district in the Indian state of Tamil Nadu. It is located 506 km (314 mi) southwest of the state capital Chennai and 53 km (33 mi) south of Madurai. Virudhunagar emerged as an important trade centre during the British rule. Located to the east of Kowsika River, Virudhunagar has an average elevation of 102 m (335 ft) above sea level and is largely flat with no major geological formations. The town has a humid climate and receives 780 mm (31 in) rainfall annually. It has been ruled at various times by Later Pandyas, Vijayanagar Empire, Madurai Nayaks, Chanda Sahib, Carnatic kingdom and the British. It was formerly known as Virudhupatti.

Virudhunagar is administered by a municipality covering an area of 6.39 km^{2} (2.47 sq mi). In 2011, the town had a population of 72,296. As the administrative headquarters of the district, the town's economy is based on the service sector, which employs 93% of the total workforce. The remaining 7% is employed in agriculture, mining, quarrying, raising livestock, manufacturing, construction, trade and commerce. Roadways are the main means of transportation, while the town also has rail connectivity. The nearest airport is Madurai Airport, located 45 km (28 mi) north-east of the town. There are 14 secondary schools, two colleges of arts and sciences (one for men and one for women), one polytechnic college, Three Engineering Colleges (Kamaraj College of Engineering and Technology, Sri Vidya, AAA) and three university study centres. Virudhunagar Government Medical College is established in the year 2021. It is located on the NH-44 nearby Virudhunagar Collector Office.

== Etymology and history ==
According to a local legend, a warrior who won a number of banners (called virudhu in Tamil) from his conquest of kingdoms, came to the town and challenged the residents. A resident accepted the challenge, killed the warrior, and then proceeded to seize the flags held by him. From then on, the town was known as Virudhukkalvetti.

Virudhunagar was a part of Madurai region (the region comprising all of southern Tamil Nadu beyond Trichy in modern times) during the 16th century CE. The region became independent from Vijayanagar Empire in 1559 under the Nayaks. Nayak rule ended in 1736 and the region was repeatedly captured several times by Chanda Sahib (1740 – 1754), Arcot Nawab and Marudhanayagam Pillai (1725 – 1764) in the middle of 18th century. In 1801, the region came under the direct control of the British East India Company and was annexed to the Madras Presidency.

The town's name was changed to Virudhupatti in 1875 and on 6 April 1923, the town council renamed it Virudhunagar. It was an important trading centre during the British rule and the merchandise from Virudhunagar was exported overseas through the ports of Kulasekharapatnam, Thoothukudi, Vaippar and Devipattinam. The town is the birthplace of K. Kamaraj, a freedom fighter, Chief Minister of Tamil Nadu from 1954 to 1963 and a recipient of the Bharat Ratna, India's highest civilian award.

== Geography and climate ==
Virudhunagar municipality covers an area of 6.39 km^{2} (2.47 sq mi) It is located 506 km (314 mi) southwest of the state capital Chennai and 53 km (33 mi) south of Madurai. The city has an average elevation of 102 m (335 ft). The town is located to the east of the Kowsika River and to the west of the Madurai–Tirnelveli railway line. The topology is largely flat, with no major geological formations. The soil types are black and red, which are conducive for crops like cotton, chillies, spices, cardamom and millet. Paddy and sugar cane are grown in places where motor pumps are available for irrigation.

Virudhungar has a borderline hot semi-arid climate (Köppen BSh) not quite wet enough for tropical savanna (As) classification. Like the rest of Tamil Nadu, Virudhunagar experiences hot weather between April and June and is relatively cooler in December and January. The average daily temperature ranges from a maximum of 38.5 °C (101.3 °F) to a minimum of 30 °C (86 °F). The town receives an annual average rainfall of 829.6 mm (32.66 in), which is less than the state average of 1,008 mm (39.7 in). The South-west monsoon, which begins in June and lasts until August, brings little rain. Most of the rain is received during the North-east monsoon in the months of October, November and December. Lime, locally called Limekankar, is the major mineral available in Virudhunagar, which is utilised by Tamil Nadu Cements, a Government of Tamil Nadu undertaking in Sivakasi and Ramco Cements, a private sector plant in R.R.Nagar in Virudhunagar.

Climate data for Virudhunagar
Month	Jan	Feb	Mar	Apr	May	Jun	Jul	Aug	Sep	Oct	Nov	Dec	Year
Mean daily maximum °C (°F)	31.726 (89.11)	34.321 (93.78)	37.871 (100.17)	36.967 (98.54)	38.094 (100.57)	37.6 (99.7)	36.79 (98.22)	36.726 (98.11)	36.15 (97.07)	35.742 (96.34)	30.95 (87.71)	30.097 (86.17)	35.25 (95.46)
Mean daily minimum °C (°F)	19.661 (67.39)	20.625 (69.13)	22.113 (71.80)	24.433 (75.98)	24.581 (76.25)	24.717 (76.49)	25.21 (77.38)	24.79 (76.62)	24.383 (75.89)	23.323 (73.98)	21.29 (70.32)	22.6 (72.7)	23.14 (73.66)
Average rainfall mm (inches)	18.5 (0.73)	23.5 (0.93)	37.6 (1.48)	76.8 (3.02)	60.2 (2.37)	18.3 (0.72)	31.1 (1.22)	51.6 (2.03)	80.8 (3.18)	191 (7.5)	175.5 (6.91)	64.7 (2.55)	829.6 (32.64)
Source: Virudhunagar district website

== Demographics and economy ==
Religions in Virudhunagar
Religion	Per cent(%)
Hindu	85.02%
Muslim	7.73%
Christian	7.09%
Sikh	0.02%
Other	0.14%

Historical population
Year	Pop.	±%
1951	46,456	—
1961	54,871	+18.1%
1971	61,904	+12.8%
1981	68,040	+9.9%
1991	70,971	+4.3%
2001	72,081	+1.6%
2011	72,296	+0.3%
Sources: 1951 – 2001

According to 2011 census, Virudhunagar had a population of 72,296 with a sex-ratio of 1,014 females for every 1,000 males, much above the national average of 929. A total of 6,454 were under the age of six, constituting 3,268 males and 3,186 females. Scheduled Castes and Scheduled Tribes accounted for 7.06% and 0.08% of the population respectively. The average literacy of the town was 84.28%, compared to the national average of 72.99%. The town had a total of 19,841 households. There were a total of 27,533 workers, comprising 54 cultivators, 64 main agricultural labourers, 703 in house hold industries, 25,266 other workers, 1,446 marginal workers, 17 marginal cultivators, 10 marginal agricultural labourers, 66 marginal workers in household industries and 1,353 other marginal workers. As of 2004, twelve recognized slums and eleven unrecognised slums were identified in the town, and a total of 17,787 people resided in the slums. The slum population was predominantly employed as daily labourers. The population density was 114 persons per hectare in 2001.

As per the religious census of 2011, Virudhunagar (M) had 85.02% Hindus, 7.73% Muslims, 7.09% Christians, 0.02% Sikhs and 0.14% following other religions.

As of 2008, a total of 228.5 ha (565 acres) constituting 35.72% of the land in Virudhunagar was used for residential purposes, 27 ha (67 acres) constituting 4.22% for commercial use, 99.5 ha (246 acres) constituting 15.6% for industrial space, 26.21 ha (64.8 acres) constituting 2.81% for public and semi-public use, 17.98 ha (44.4 acres) constituting 2.81% for educational purposes and 195.79 ha (483.8 acres) constituting 30.6% for non-urban purposes like agriculture and irrigation.

== Economy ==
Virudhunagar is a marketing and service town for the surrounding areas. It is also one of the important Industrial districts, followed by Coimbatore and Salem. Many kinds of spices and edible oils are manufactured for national and international markets. It is the administrative headquarters of the district. The economy of the town is based on the service sector, with 93% of the workforce employed therein as of 2001. The rest of the workforce is employed in agriculture, mining, quarrying, raising livestock, manufacturing, construction, trade and commerce. In 2001, 5.4% of the workforce was employed in the industrial sector, making it the second-largest sector. There is little agricultural activity in the town, due to the local geography and unfavorable climate for growing crops and poor irrigation facilities. The town has a few oil mills and match factories. Commercial activities are concentrated around Katchery Road, Pullalakottai Road and the main bazaar. In 2001, the percentage of the workforce in the service sector had increased from the previous decade. All major nationalised banks like State Bank of India, Indian Bank, Central Bank of India, Punjab National Bank, Indian Overseas Bank, and private banks like TMB (Tamilnad Mercantile Bank), ICICI Bank, City Union Bank and Axis Bank have branches in Virudhunagar. All of these banks have ATMs located in various parts of the town. TMB is the first bank to have its branch, since 1940. It also has an E-Lobby in the bazaar. Virudhunagar is famous for Commission Marketing's millet, cotton, and edible oils. In recent years, Virudhunagar is into e-commerce also.

== Municipal administration and politics ==
Municipality officials
Chairman	G. Shanti
Commissioner	A. Sardar
Vice-chairman	S. Mariappan
Elected members
Member of Legislative Assembly	Selvam P
Member of Parliament	Manicka Tagore

The Virudhunagar municipality (formerly Virudupatti municipality) was established in 1915 as a third-grade municipality. It was upgraded to second-grade in 1956 and then to special grade in 1998.^{a} The municipality has 36 wards, and there is an elected councillor for each ward. The functions of the municipality are devolved into six departments: General Administration/Personnel, Engineering, Revenue, Public Health, City Planning and Information Technology (IT). All these departments are under the control of a municipal commissioner. The legislative powers are vested in a body of 36 members, one from each of the 36 wards. The legislative body is headed by an elected chairperson, who is assisted by a deputy chairperson.

Virudhunagar comes under the Virudhunagar assembly constituency and it elects a member to the Tamil Nadu Legislative Assembly once every five years. The assembly seat was won once each by Dravida Munnetra Kazhagam (DMK) (1996), ICS (SCS) (1991), Desiya Murpokku Dravida Kazhagam (DMDK) (2011), Janata Party (1984), Marumalarchi Dravida Munnetra Kazhagam (MDMK) (2006), Tamil Maanila Congress (TMC) (2001) and Indian National Congress (INC) (1989), and twice by Dravida Munnetra Kazhagam (DMK) (1996, 2016), All India Anna Dravid Munnetra Kazhagam (AIADMK) (1977 and 1980). The current MLA of the constituency is Selvam P representing the Tamilaga Vettri Kazhagam (TVK).

During the 1957 elections, Virudhunagar was a part of Srivilliputhur constituency and was held by the INC and an independent. During the 1962 elections, the town was a part of Aruppukkottai constituency and was held by the Forward Block party. The town was a part of Virudhunagar Lok Sabha Constituency during the 1967 elections and was held by the Swatantra Party. The constituency was held by DMK during the 1971 elections, INC during the 1977 elections, and AIADMK during the 1980, 1984, 1989, 1991 and 2014 elections, Communist Party of India (CPI) during 1996 and MDMK during the 1998, 1999 and 2004 elections.

Virudhunagar is now part of the Virudhunagar (Lok Sabha constituency) – it has the following five assembly constituencies – Thiruparankundram, Thirumangalam, Sattur, Virudhunagar, and Aruppukkottai. The current Member of Parliament from the constituency is Manicka Tagore from the Congress party.

Law and order in Virudhunagar is maintained by the Virudhunagar subdivision of the Tamil Nadu Police, headed by a deputy superintendent. There are three police stations in the town, one of which is an all-women police station. There are special units like prohibition enforcement, district crime, social justice and human rights, district crime records and special branches that operate at the district level police division headed by a superintendent of police.

== Transportation ==
The Virudhunagar municipality maintains a total of 78.923 km (49.040 mi) of roads: 38.36 km (23.84 mi) of concrete roads, 39.428 km (24.499 miles) of bituminous roads, 0.39 km (0.24 mi) of water bound macadam (WBM) roads, 0.488 km (0.303 mi) of earthen roads and 0.257 km (0.160 mi) of other roads. The major roads include National Highway 44 and three district roads that connect Virudhunagar with neighbouring towns like Sivakasi, Madurai, Rajapalayam, Aruppukkottai, Sattur and Kovilpatti. There is a bypass road located west of the town connecting Virudhunagar to Kallupatti, that reduces traffic inside the town.

Virudhunagar is served by a town bus service, which provides connectivity within the town and the suburbs. There are privately operated mini-bus services that cater to the local transport needs. The main bus stand, located in the centre of the town, has 25 bus bays. The Tamil Nadu State Transport Corporation operates daily services connecting various cities to Virudhunagar. The corporation operates a computerised reservation centre in the main bus stand. The State Express Transport Corporation operates long-distance buses connecting the town to important cities like Chennai, Tiruppur and Thoothukudi. The major inter-city bus routes from the town are to adjacent cities like Madurai, Chennai, Rajapalayam, Tenkasi, Kovilpatti, Tuticorin, Tiruchendur, Nagercoil, Tirunelveli, Aruppukottai and Rameshwaram. The town bus routes to surrounding villages are to Thayilpatti, Vilampatti, Alangulam, Vilampatti, M.Pudupatti, Alamarathupatti and Muthalipatti.

The Virudhunagar railway station is located in the major rail head from Madurai to Kanyakumari. The Southern Railway operates daily express trains to places like Chennai, Tuticorin, Kanyakumari, Tirunelveli, Kovilpatti, Tenkasi, Guruvayoor, Tirupathi, Mumbai, Trivandrum, Mysuru, Howrah, Palakkad, Kozhikode, Kannur, Mangalore, Madgaon and Nizamuddin. There are passenger trains connecting the town to Madurai, Tenkasi, Kollam, Tirunelveli, Kovilpatti, Kumbakonam, Mayiladuthurai, Erode, Nagercoil, Coimbatore, Manamadurai. The nearest airport is Madurai Airport, located 45 km (28 mi) northeast of the town.

== Education and utility services ==
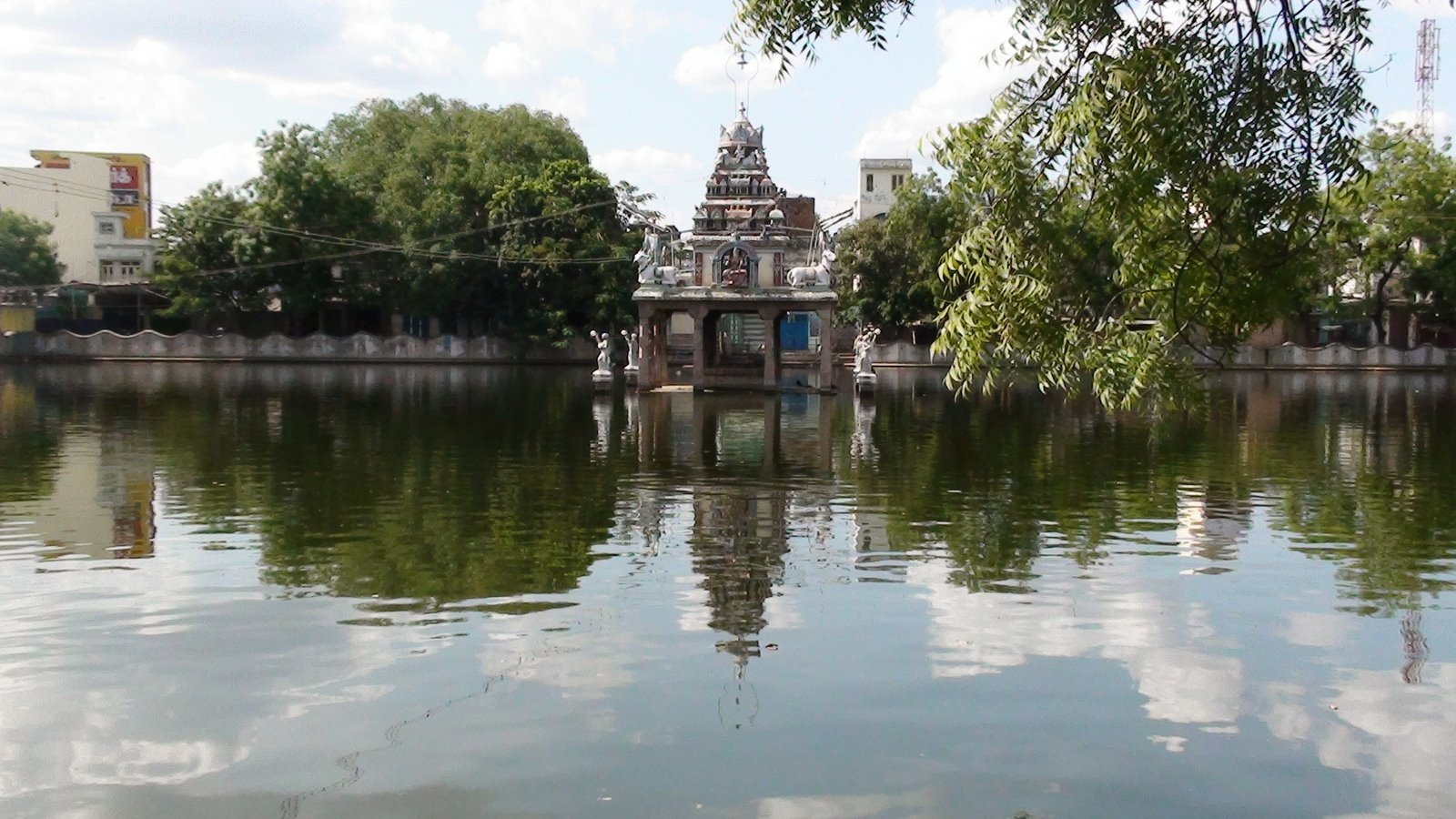
Temple tank of Mariamman temple in Virudhunagar

There are 14 secondary schools in Virudhunagar. The town has two arts and science colleges, namely V.H.N.S.N. College and V.V.V. College for Women. V.S.V.N. Polytechnic College is the only polytechnic college in the town. Three university study centers operated by the Tamil Nadu Open University, Annamalai University, and Alagappa University are located in the town. The district also have a Deemed University named Kalasalingam University, located in Krishnankovil. There is one Educational consultant and career guidance provider with HRD and MEA(All Embassy Attestation), Mahindra Varman Educational Group in SIVAKASI, located near Bus stand.

Electricity supply to Virudhunagar is regulated and distributed by the Tamil Nadu Electricity Board (TNEB). The town and its suburbs form the Virudhunagar Electricity Distribution Circle. A chief distribution engineer is stationed at the regional headquarters. Water supply is provided to the town by the Virudhunagar municipality from three sources, namely Anaikuttam, Karuseri Kalquarry and Sukkravarpatti Summer Storage Tank. During the period 2000–01, a total of 3.86 million litres of water was supplied every day to households in the town. About 35 metric tonnes of solid waste are collected from Virudhunagar every day by door-to-door collection. Subsequently, the sanitary department of the Virudhunagar municipality carries out the source segregation and dumping. The coverage of solid waste management had an efficiency of 100% as of 2001. There is no underground drainage system in the town, and the sewerage system for disposal of sludge is through septic tanks, open drains and public conveniences. The municipality maintains stormwater drains on all municipal roads. There are 35 hospitals in the town, one siddha dispensary and two municipal maternity homes that take care of the healthcare needs of the citizens. There are a total of 2,875 street lamps in the town: 276 sodium lamps, five mercury vapour lamps, 2,592 tube lights and two high-mast beam lamps. The municipality operates three markets, namely, the Municipal Market, Uzhavar Santhai, and Virudhunagar Bazaar Market, that cater to the needs of the town and the surrounding rural areas.

== Places of interest ==
- The Arulmigu Sri Meenakshi Chokkanathaswamy Temple is a 1000 year old Shiva temple believed to have been consecrated by Sage Vishvamitra.
- The Sri Veyilugandhamman Tirukkovil is an Amman temple in the town. The old name of Virudhunagar, Veyilugandalpattanam, is believed to have been derived from the name of this goddess. An annual celebration of this temple is performed during the Tamil month of Vaikasi.
- The Parashakti Mariamman Temple is a Hindu temple located at the centre of the town. An annual temple festival celebrated during April is one of the prominent festivals of the town.
- The house of Kamaraj has been converted into a memorial, and is one of the most prominent tourist attractions in Virudhunagar.
- The Kullursandai reservoir, which attracts many migratory birds.

== Notes ==
=== Footnotes ===
- The municipalities in Tamil Nadu are graded special, selection, grade I and grade II based on income and population.
