= Alangulam, Virudhunagar =

Alangulam
- Town
- Location in Tamil Nadu, India
- Coordinates: 9.94°N 77.57°E
- Country: India
- State: Tamil Nadu
- District: Virudhunagar
- Elevation: 127 m (417 ft)

Population (2001)
  - Total: 4,965

Languages
  - Official: Tamil
- Time zone: UTC+5:30 (IST)

Alangulam is a village in Vembakkottai block, Vembakottai taluk, Virudhunagar district in the state of Tamil Nadu in India. The state-government-run cement and asbestos factory is located here. The area is rich in limestone and asbestos. A nearby school addresses the needs of local students. This area contains three primary government schools and One Higher secondary school. The private schools are Tancem Educational Trust Matric Hr sec School run by Tamil Nadu Cements and Maheswari Nursery Primary school.

== Geography ==
Alangulam is located at 9.94°N 77.57°E. It has an average elevation of 127 metres (416 feet).

== Demographics ==
As of 2001 India census, Alangulam had a population of 4,965. Males constitute 51% of the population and females 49%. Alangulam has an average literacy rate of 77%, higher than the national average of 59.5%; with 82% of the males and 74% of females literate. 8% of the population is under 6 years of age.

== Politics ==
Assembly Constituency: Sattur (Assembly constituency)

Loksabha Constituency: Virudhunagar
