= Rajapalayam =

- City
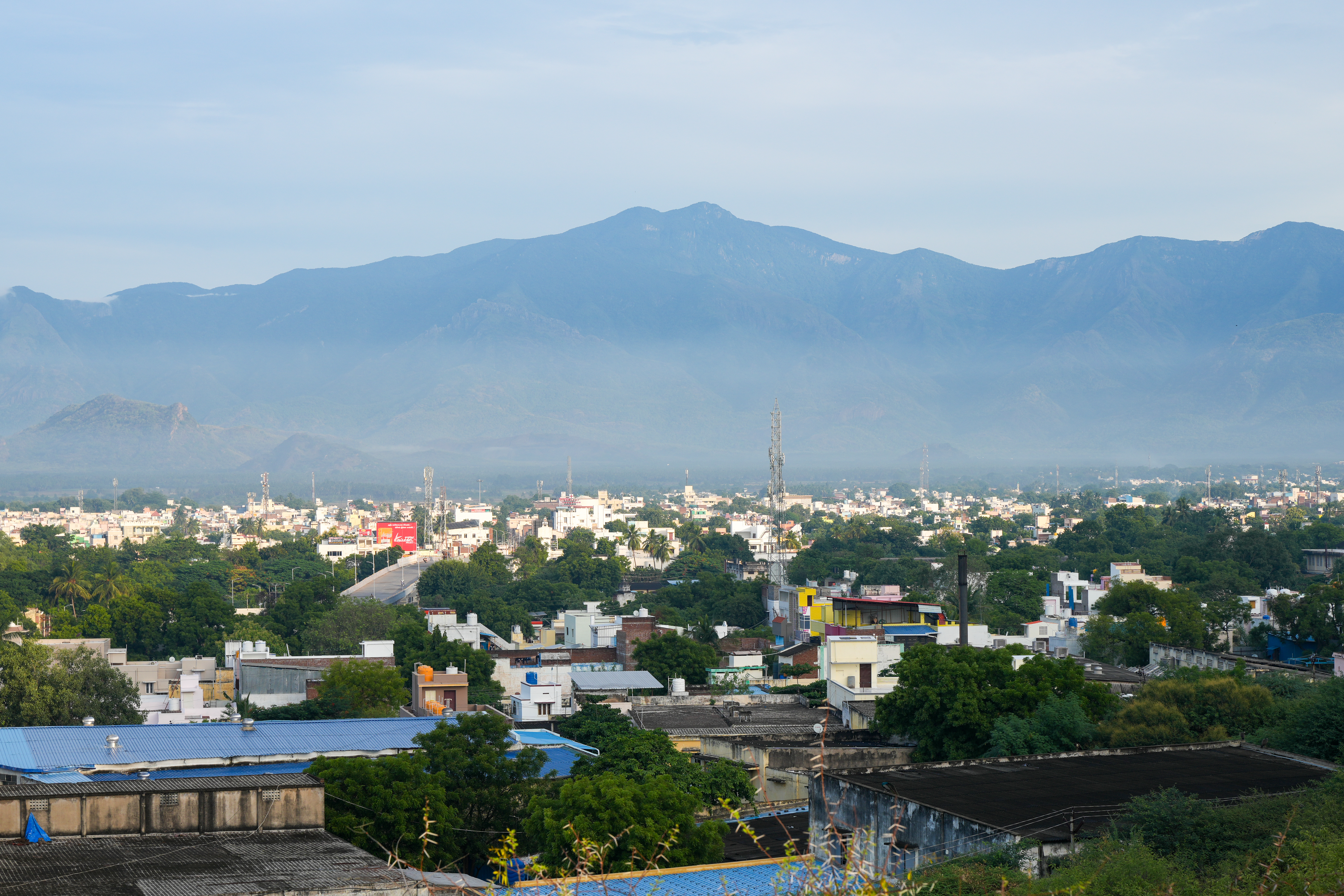
- Rajapalayam from the southeast
- Nickname: Cotton City
- Rajapalayam (Tamil Nadu) Rajapalayam (India)
- Coordinates: 09°27′05.4″N 77°33′15.5″E
- Country: India
- State: Tamil Nadu
- District: Virudhunagar district
- Taluk: Rajapalayam

Government
  - Type: Special Grade Municipality
  - Body: Rajapalayam municipality
  - MLA: Jegadeshwari. K. (2026–Current)

Area
  - Total: 11.36 km^{2} (4.39 sq mi)
  - Rank: 1 in district
- Elevation: 187 m (614 ft)

Population (2011)
  - Total: 130,442
  - Rank: 34
  - Density: 11,480/km^{2} (29,740/sq mi)

Languages
  - Official: Tamil
- Time zone: UTC+5:30 (IST)
- Pincode(s): 626117,626108,626110
- Area code: +91-4563
- Vehicle registration: TN 67, TN 84

Rajapalayam (Tamil: [ɾaːdʑabaːɭaɪjam]) is a city in the Indian state of Tamil Nadu. It is the largest municipality and the largest town in the Virudhunagar district. Rajapalayam is located on the Madurai to Kollam National Highway at a distance of 562 km south of the state capital Chennai at the foothills of Western Ghats. The economy is primarily industrial with several mills for spinning and weaving. The city is known for its mangoes and the Rajapalayam breed of dogs.

== Climate ==
The climate of the region is of the semi-arid tropical monsoon type. The average temperature range is 20 °C to 37 °C.

== Demographics ==
Religious census
| Religion | Percent(%) |
| Hindu | 94.53% |
| Muslim | 3.48% |
| Christian | 1.75% |
| Sikh | 0.02% |
| Other | 0.21% |

According to the 2011 census, Rajapalayam had a population of 130,442 with 1,014 females for every 1,000 males, far above the national average of 929. A total of 11,604 individuals (5,927 males and 5,677 females) were under the age of six. Scheduled Castes and Scheduled Tribes accounted for 13.51% and 0.09% of the population respectively. The average literacy of the town was 77.87%; the national average was 72.99%. The town has a total of 37,797 households. There are 53,913 workers, comprising 380 cultivators, 3,676 main agricultural labourers, 1,375 in household industries, 45,223 other workers, 3,259 marginal workers, 34 marginal cultivators, 326 marginal agricultural labourers, 286 marginal workers in household industries and 2,613 other marginal workers. According to the religious census of 2011, the population is 94.53% Hindu, 3.48% Muslim, 1.75% Christian, 0.02% Sikh and 0.21% other.

== Geography ==
The mountains of the Western Ghats are to the west of the town (12 km from the town), and the Sanjeevi hills are to the east. These moderate the climate, and several water catchment areas in the hills provide water for the town. Water is stored in the 6th mile water reservoir. There are several major lakes around the town, including Kondaneri, Karungulam, Pirandaikulam, and Sengulam. The soil in the area is classified by the government as red loam. The area of the municipality is about 11.36 sq.kms which makes the town the biggest municipality in Virudhunagar district.

== Industries ==
The principal industry was initially agriculture. In 1936, Thiru P. A. C. Ramasamy Raja started the first cotton spinning mill, called Rajapalayam Mills Ltd. Later, more textile mills were started. Today, Rajapalayam is a major hub of the textile industry, famous for bandages, woven fabric, nightwear, and other products. The neighboring town of Chatrapatti (Virudhunagar Dist.) is a large player in producing surgical cotton gauze, and nearby Dhalavaipuram and Muhavoor manufacture women's nightwear.

== Transportation ==
=== By Land ===
==== Road ====
The National Highway NH-744 from Madurai to Kollam passes through the town. State highway SH-41 (Rajapalayam-Sankarankovil-Tirunelveli) links the major parts of the extreme south of Tamil Nadu, including Tirunelveli, Tuticorin and Kanyakumari. The road also offers good freight connectivity to Tamil Nadu's second largest seaport, Tuticorin. State highway SH-186 (Rajapalayam-Vembakottai) connects the town to the east part of Virudhunagar district and passes through the fast-growing industrial towns of Chatrapatti and Alangulam.

==== Bus ====
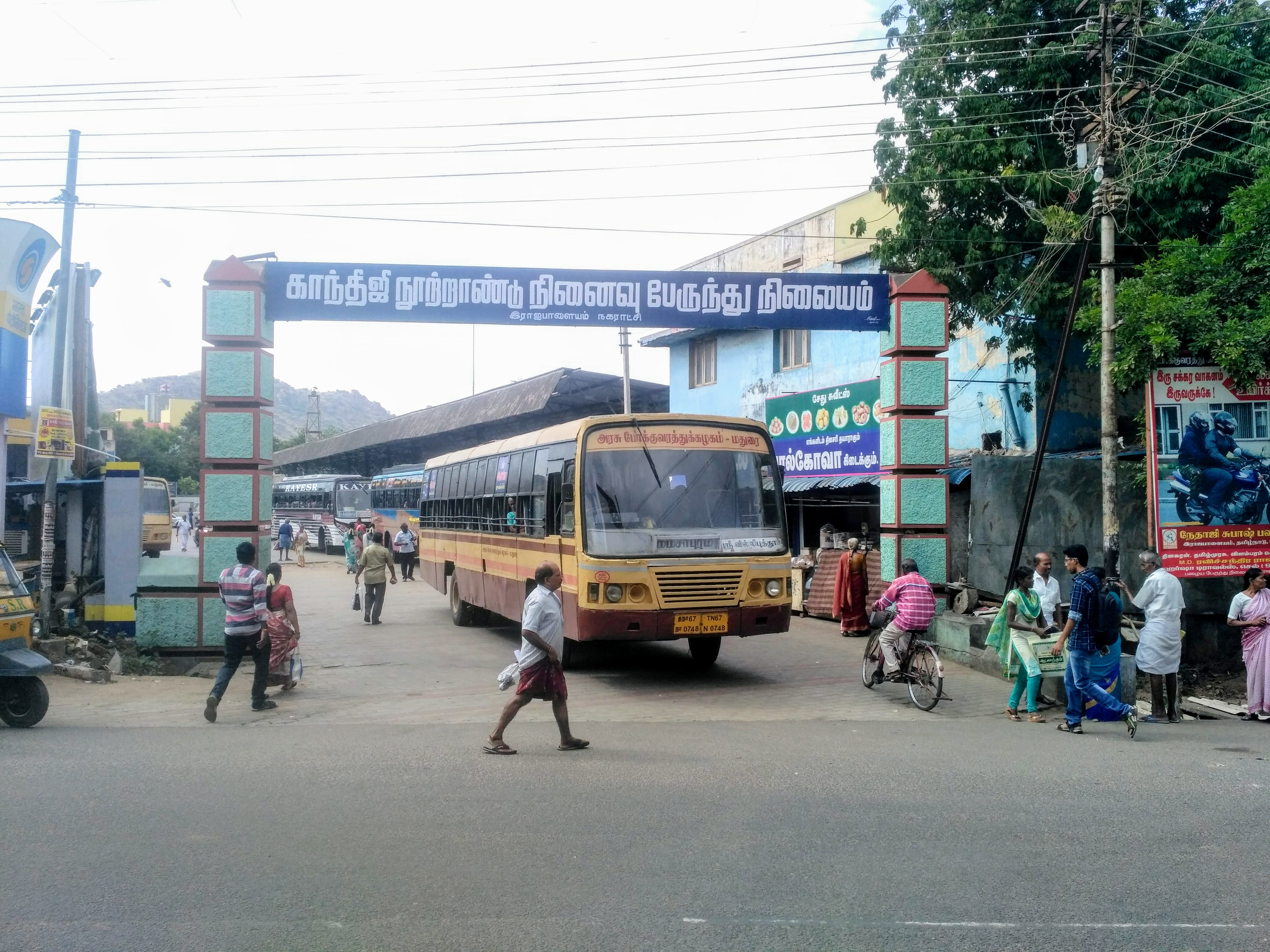
Rajapalayam Old Bus Stand

Rajapalayam's long-distance bus station, located on Sankarankovil Road, is served by buses from the government of Tamil Nadu's TNSTC (Tamil Nadu State Transport Corporation) and private transport companies. Several private and government operated services connect to Chennai, Bengaluru, Coimbatore, Hosur, Pondicherry, Salem, Tirupati, Tiruppur, Trichy, Vellore and other major cities.

Rajapalayam old bus station is the boarding point for buses connecting nearby villages. It is also called Old bus stand or Town bus stand. Sankarankovil Mukku road connects the new bus stand.

==== Rail ====
The Rajapalayam railway station is in the Southern Railways zone/Madurai division of Indian Railways and falls on the Virudhunagar to Kollam line. The station code is RJPM.

Passenger Trains running daily via Rajapalayam:

| Train No/Name | Origin | Destination | Rajapalayam Arrival Time |
|---|---|---|---|
| 16848/Sengottai - Mayiladuthurai Express (Unreserved) | Sengottai | Madurai | 08:21am |
| 56771/Madurai - Sengottai Express (Unreserved) | Madurai | Sengottai | 09:04am |
| 16327/Guruvayur Express | Madurai | Guruvayur | 01:08pm |
| 56772/Sengottai - Madurai Passenger (Unreserved) | Sengottai | Madurai | 01:34pm |
| 16328/Madurai Express | Guruvayur | Madurai | 04:48pm |
| 16847/Mayiladuthurai - Sengottai Express (Unreserved) | Mayiladuthurai | Sengottai | 06:59pm |

=== By Air ===
The nearest international airport is Madurai Airport (~80 km).

== Notable people ==
- P. S. Kumaraswamy Raja, Chief Minister of Tamil Nadu (1949–1952) and Governor of Orissa (1954–1956)
- S. Peter Alphonse, Indian National Congress politician elected to Tamil Nadu legislative assembly twice from Tenkasi constituency (1989 and 1991) and once from Kadayanallur constituency (2006)
- Shiva Ayyadurai
- Vijay Sethupathi
- Samuthirakani
- Vasantha Balan
- Muthukaalai
