= Kansapuram =

Kansapuram Khansapuram
- village
- Location in Tamil Nadu, India
- Coordinates: 9°37′53″N 77°36′7″E
- Country: India
- State: Tamil Nadu
- District: Virudhunagar

Government
  - Body: Panchayat

Languages
  - Official: Tamil
- Time zone: UTC+5:30 (IST)
- PIN: 626133
- Telephone code: 04563
- Vehicle registration: TN-67
- Nearest city: Madurai
- Sex ratio: 1:1 ♂/♀
- Lok Sabha constituency: Tenkasi
- Assembly constituency: Srivilliputtur
- Civic agency: Panchayat
- Climate: Apr-May - Min 20 Deg C Max 42 Deg C and May - Mar - Min 20 Deg C Max 30 deg C (Köppen)

Kansapuram is a village in the foothills of the Western Ghats in Virudhunagar District, Tamil Nadu, India. It is located 2 kilometres south of Koomapatti and 7 kilometres west of Watrap. Kansapuram has road connections to the district headquarters of Southern Tamil Nadu including Madurai, Virudhunagar, and Tirunelveli.

== Climate ==
The climate of the region is semi-arid tropical monsoon type. Temperature range is 20 °C to 37 °C. It has a high mean temperature and a low degree of humidity. April, May and June are the hottest months. The southwest monsoon which sets in June and lasts till August brings scanty rain. The bulk of the rainfall is received during the northeast monsoon in the months of October, November and December.

== People ==
Kansapuram is the birthplace of Gnanavallal Paranjothi Mahan, a teacher of kundalini yoga and founder of the Universal Peace Sanctuary in Chennai.

== Culture ==
Sri Vallapalathu Karuppasamy

The people of Kansapuram celebrate the festival for the Goddess Mangammal every year in the Tamil month of Purattaasi.

== Agriculture ==
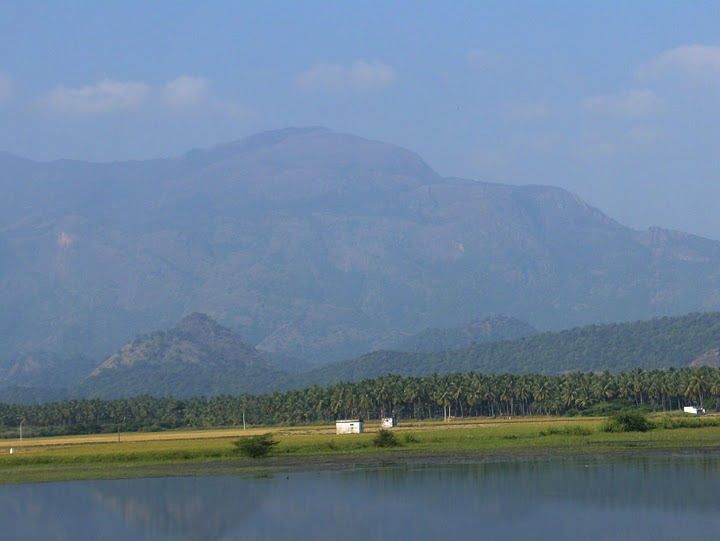
Majestic hills, Paddy fields and coconut groves

Kansapuram is situated near the source of the Arjuna River. There is a dam here for irrigation called Pilavakal dam. Agriculture is the primary livelihood. The main work is cultivation of paddies, coconut and cotton, sugarcane with paddy cultivation being the most important.

There are two harvest seasons in a year for paddy & cotton. One is Kaalam when the crop is harvested in the month of Thai and the other being Kodai meaning summer harvest. It is becoming increasingly difficult to get manual labour for farm work including harvest when huge harvesting machines are pressed into service. People were dependent on bullock carts to a great extent in the not so remote past and it has really become a thing of the past now. Tractors are used for farming extensively - dry and wet ploughing, harvested paddy transportation, even for transporting people. The area has a number of coconut groves, fruit plantations (jack fruit, mango), etc.

Pilavakkal is a dam here in Kansapuram village for irrigation and agriculture.

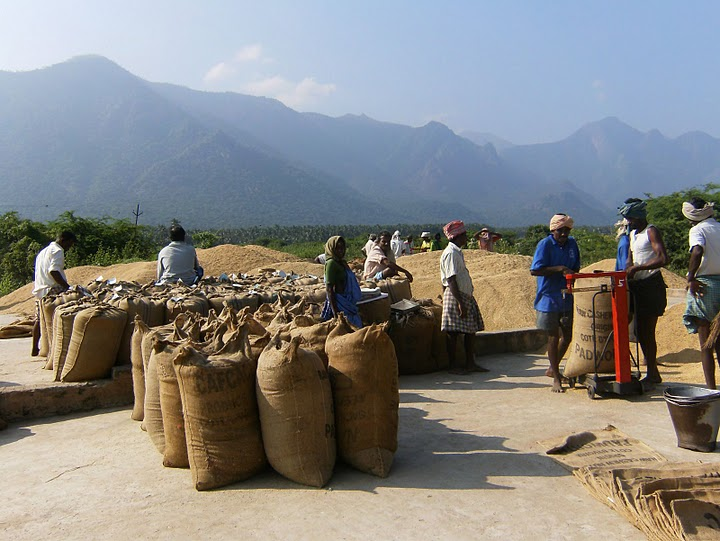
Weighing the paddy before dispatch to traders

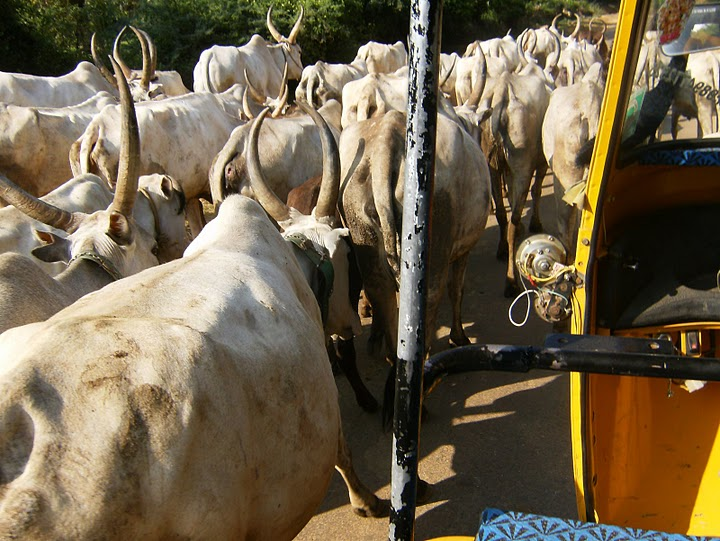
Amidst the cattle in an Auto!

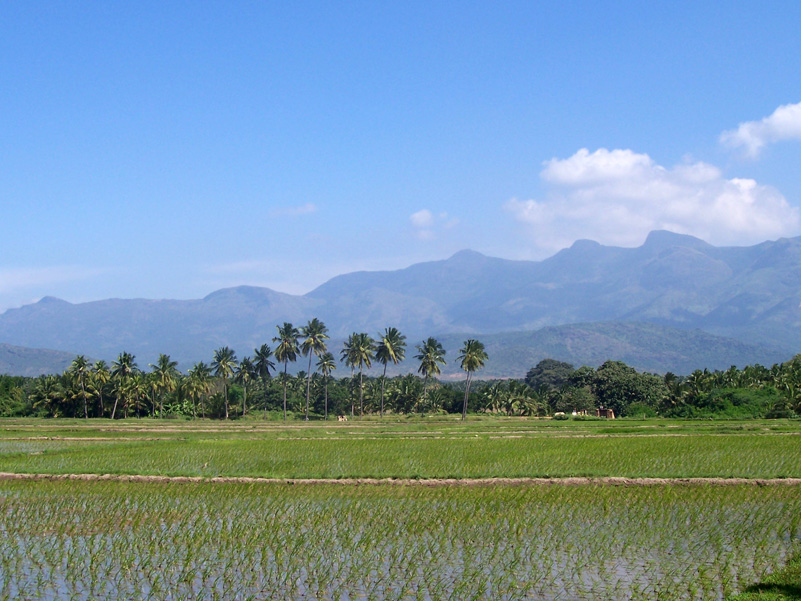
Paddy field and Western Ghats in the background

== Education ==
Schools in Kansapuram:

- Panchayat Union Middle School
- R.C. School

Kalasalingam University at Krishnankoil is about 8 km from Kansapuram. The university has an Engineering college, Pharmacy college, college of Business Administration, Polytechnic, ITI, Teacher Training Institute and several other courses under its umbrella.

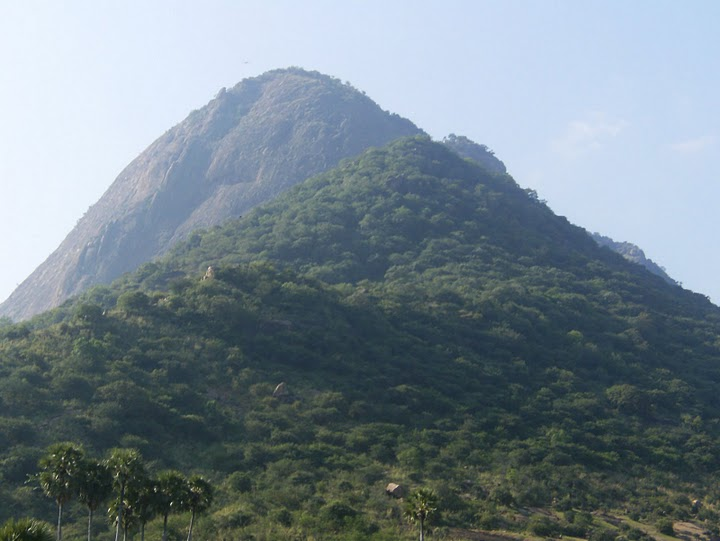
Hill in the form of a measure of paddy

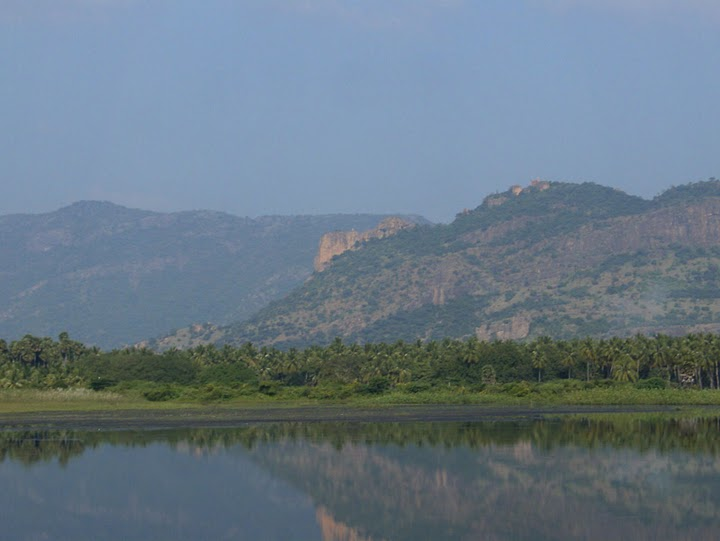
Patharangulam Kanmai one of the two important water reservoirs

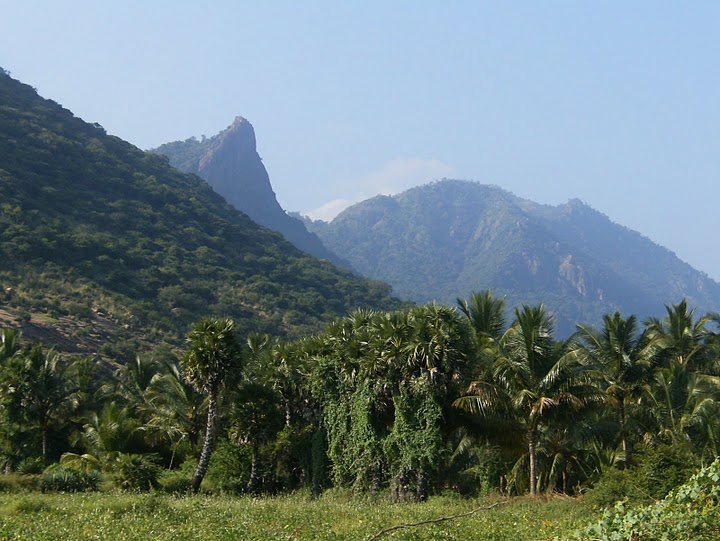
En route to Athi Koil on the road adjoining Western Ghats

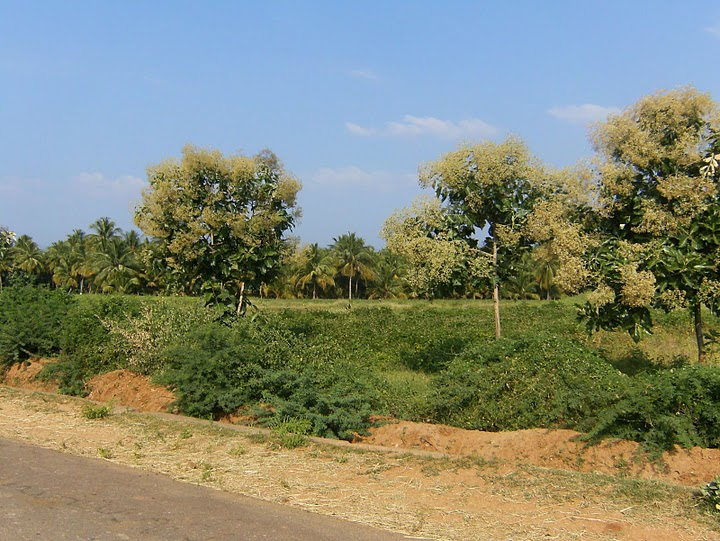
Road to Athi koil near Mandapam

== Transport ==
=== Railway ===
The nearest railway station is 23 kilometers away at Srivilliputtur. There are several passenger trains from Madurai to Srivilliputtur. The Pothigai Express is a daily train from Chennai Egmore to Sengottai that reaches Srivilliputtur at 6:00 a.m., and a more frequent local train runs between Madurai Junction and Sengottai. From Srivilliputtur local busses provide service to Kansapuram.

=== Road ===
Kansapuram has road connections to the district headquarters of Southern Tamil Nadu including Madurai 85 km, Virudhunagar 50 km, and Tirunelveli 125 km. National Highway 208 (Madurai, Tamil Nadu - Kollam, Kerala) passes close to Kansapuram.

Kansapuram is connected from NH-208 around 12 km (From Krishnan Kovil) and 24 km (from Alagapuri Village) and plenty of buses operate to and from the places below.

- Madurai
- Srivilliputtur
- Kovilpatti
- Sivakasi
- Rajapalayam
- Virudhunagar

=== Airport ===
The nearest Airport is Madurai Airport (80 km). Numerous local taxi operators transport passengers to and from the airport.
