= Sundarapandiam =

- Town
- Location in Tamil Nadu, India
- Coordinates: 9°37′15″N 77°40′55″E
- Country: India
- State: Tamil Nadu
- District: Virudhunagar

Population (2001)
  - Total: 8,547

Languages
  - Official: Tamil
- Time zone: UTC+5:30 (IST)
- Postal code: 626126

Sundarapandiam is a panchayat town in Watrap taluk , Virudhunagar district in the Indian state of Tamil Nadu.

== Geography ==
=== Water bodies ===
Sundarapandiam is located at river bed of Arjuna river. Many small lakes(Kanmai) are located around this place, namely, Senkulum, Periyakulam, and Karisalkulam. The main source of drinking water is taken underground.

== Hills ==
A branch of western ghat is located south of this village and it is commonly known as south hill (தெற்கு மலை).

== Demographics ==
As of 2001 India census, Sundarapandiam had a population of 8547. Males constitute 50% of the population and females 50%. Sundarapandiam has an average literacy rate of 60%, higher than the national average of 59.5%: male literacy is 71%, and female literacy is 49%. In Sundarapandiam, 8% of the population is under 6 years of age. Weaving and Agriculture are Main occupations of the people living here.

== Transport ==
Sundarapandiam (major panchayat) is located one 1 km from the main road between Krishnankoil and Watrap. Approximately, every 15 minutes a bus leaves from Srivilliputtur (via, Krishnancoil) or from Watrap to this place. Another mode of reaching to Sundarapandiam by auto. Take an auto from Krishnankoil which is located 6 km away.

Krishnankoil can be reached around the clock by taking a bus at Madurai (Mattuthavani) bound for Senkottai/Tenkasi/Rajapalayam. It is located 80 km from Madurai.

Nearest Railway Station: Srivilliputtur (15 km distant)

== Education ==
=== List of Festivals ===
Apart from Tamilar's main festivals of Deepavali & Thai Pongal, 3 main local festivals are celebrated in Grand manner they are

- Muthallamman Pongal
- Mariamman and Kaliamman Pongal
- Muppidari Amman Pongal
- Maha Shiva Rathiri
- Kalleri Mariyamman Pongal
- Chithirai Thiruvizha celebrate at Sri Vaikundamoorthy temple ( periya kovil locally )

=== List of schools ===
- Government Higher Secondary School
- Union Elementary School
- Viveka School (English Medium)
- Saliyar Elementary School
- Sithi Vinayagar Elementary School, Agatthapatti

Nearest Airport : Madurai (70 km distant)

== Adjacent communities ==
- Agathapatti
- Sempatti
- Venkatapuram
- Ramachandrapuram
- Madurapuri
