= Madavar Vilagam Vaidyanathar temple =

Vaidyanathar temple
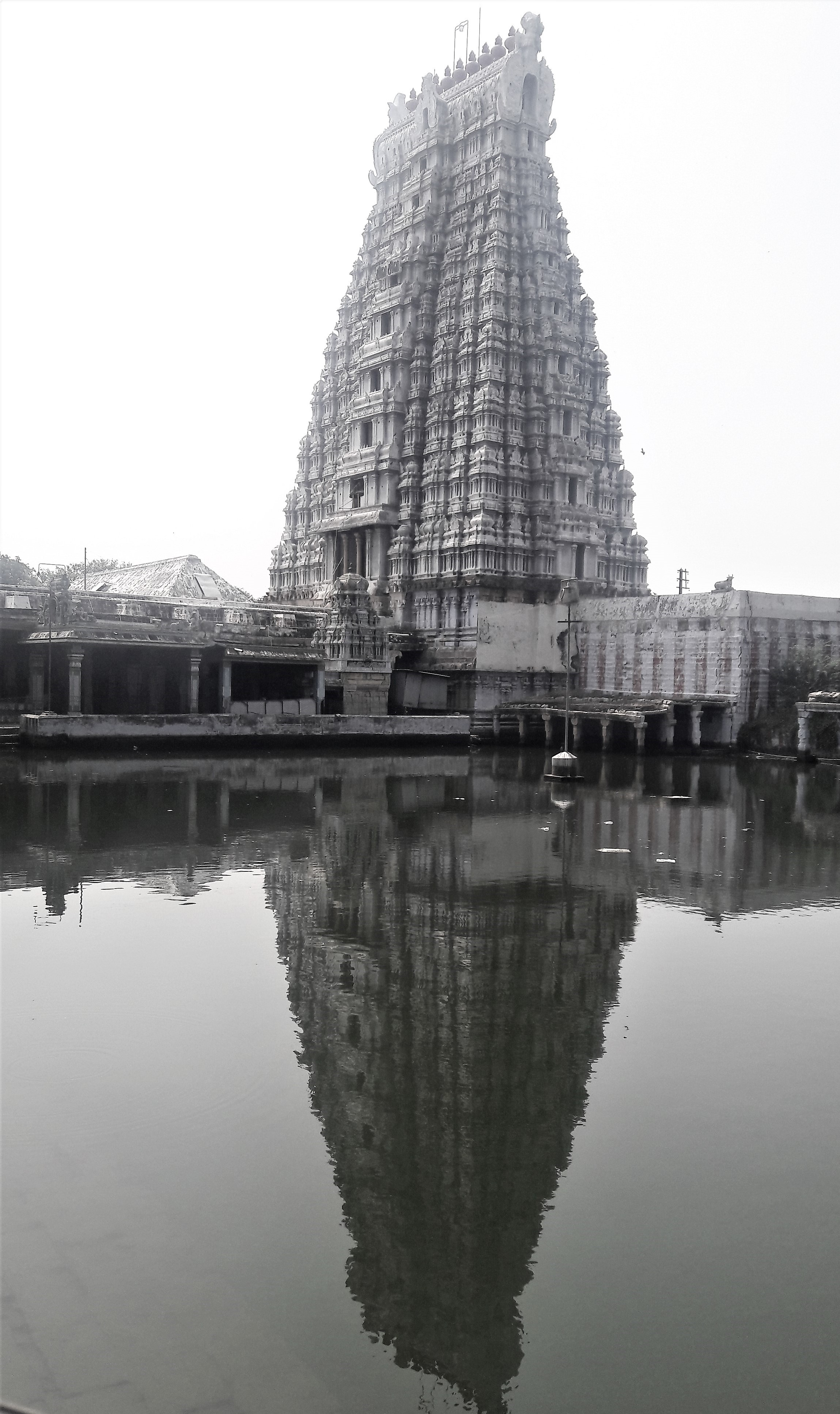

- Location in Tamil Nadu

Religion
- Affiliation: Hinduism
- Deity: Vaithyanatha Swamy Sivakami

Location
- Location: Madavar Vilagam
- State: Tamil Nadu
- Country: India
- Coordinates: 9°30′5″N 77°37′35″E

Architecture
- Type: Dravidian architecture

Madavar Vilagam Vaidyanathar temple is a Shiva temple in Madavar Vilagam, one kilometer south of Srivilliputhur in Virudhunagar district in the South Indian state of Tamil Nadu, and is dedicated to the Hindu god Shiva. Constructed in the Dravidian style of architecture, the temple has two precincts. Shiva is worshiped as Vaidyanathar and his consort Parvati as Sivakami. The temple is the largest Shiva temple in the district. Shiva is worshipped as Vaidyanathar or the "God of healing". The holy water of the Siddhamirtham tank in the temple complex is believed to have curative effects, and a holy dip here is believed to cure all diseases. The temple was built by Thirumalai Nayak during the 16th century.

A granite wall surrounds the temple, enclosing all its shrines. The temple has a five-tiered gateway tower originally built by Chandrakula Pandya Vijayanagar and Nayak kings commissioned pillared halls and major shrines of the temple during the 16th century. The temple has artistic sculptures representative of Nayak art.

The temple is maintained and administered by the Hindu Religious and Endowment Board of the Government of Tamil Nadu.

== Legend and History ==
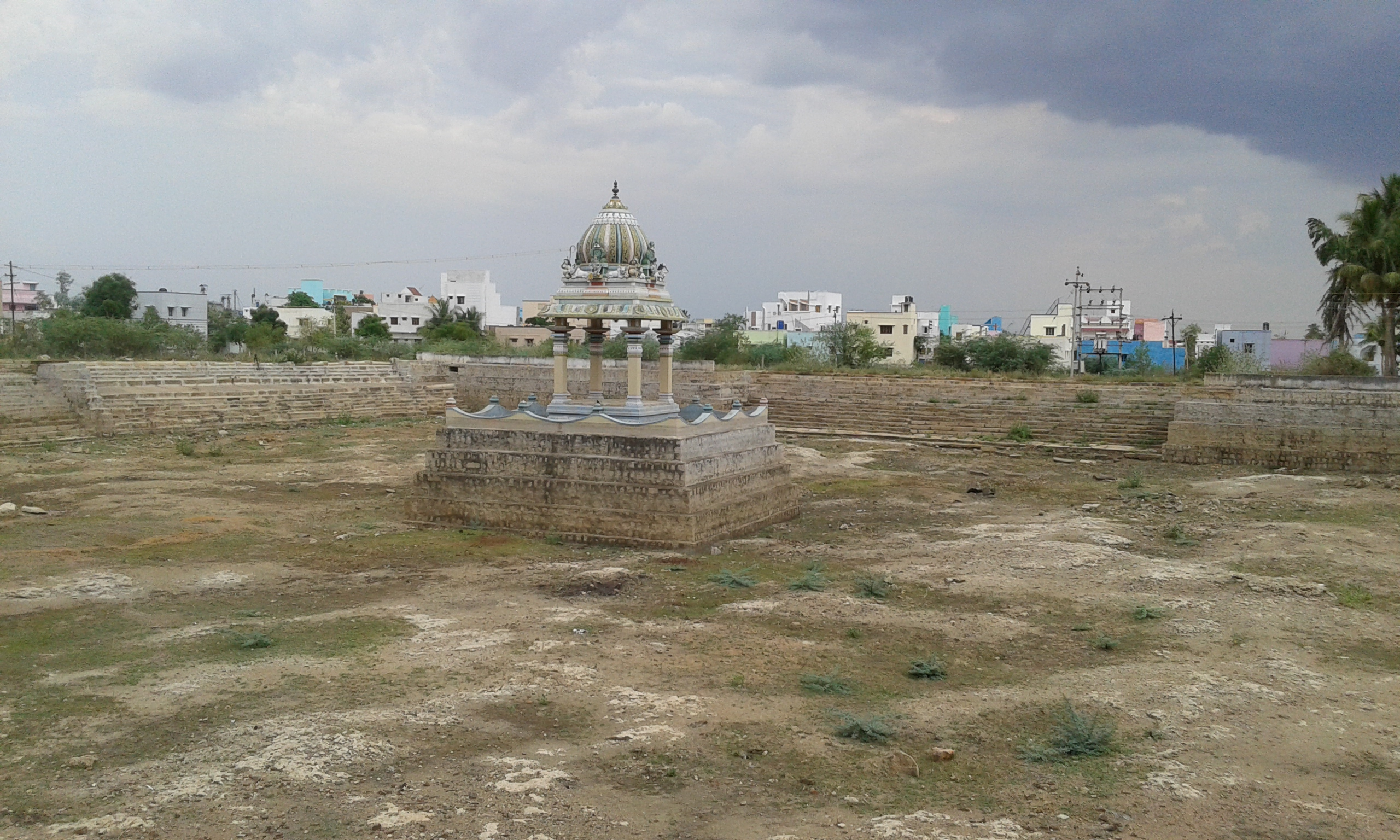
Temple tank opposite to the temple

As per Hindu legend, Shiva appeared for a staunch devotee in the form of her mother to help her delivery. To quench her thirst, Shiva is believed to have split his toe nail that resulted in a spring in the form of Siddhamritha tank. As per local legend, the Nayak king Thirumalai Nayak suffered from stomach pain and he arrived at Madavar Vilagam in an ivory palanquin and stayed there for 48 days. He was completely cured and as a mark of his gratitude, he constructed the Natarajar hall as in Madurai Meenakshi temple. There are many inscriptions in the temple from the Pandya dynasty and Thirumalai Nayak indicating various grants to the temple. The Pandya inscriptions refer the temple name as Thirukkattralishvaram Udaiyar.

== Architecture ==
The temple has a five-tiered gopuram (temple tower) and large precincts. The central shrine is that of Vaidyanathar present as lingam in the inner most sanctum. The first precinct around the sanctum has the metal images of Somaskanda and stone sculptures of Nataraja, Durga, Dakshinamoorthy, Surya (Sun god). The shrine of Sivakami is located in a parallel shrine to the right of the sanctum. There are two gates to the temple, each leading to the Shiva and Sivakami shrines. The Sthala Vriksha (temple tree) is margosa (Azadirachta indica) which possesses medicinal properties. The temple has two water tanks, one located opposite to the temple and one right to the main gate. The Siddhamirdham tank located opposite to the temple is believed to be having curating effects where worshipers take a holy dip. The temple has a Kalayana Mahal (marriage hall) in front of the Sivakami shrine and the sculpture of Nayak king can be found there. There are paintings from the Nayak period in ceiling of the hall leading to the sanctum. In modern times, the temple is maintained and administered by the Hindu Religious and Endowment Board of the Government of Tamil Nadu.

== Festival ==
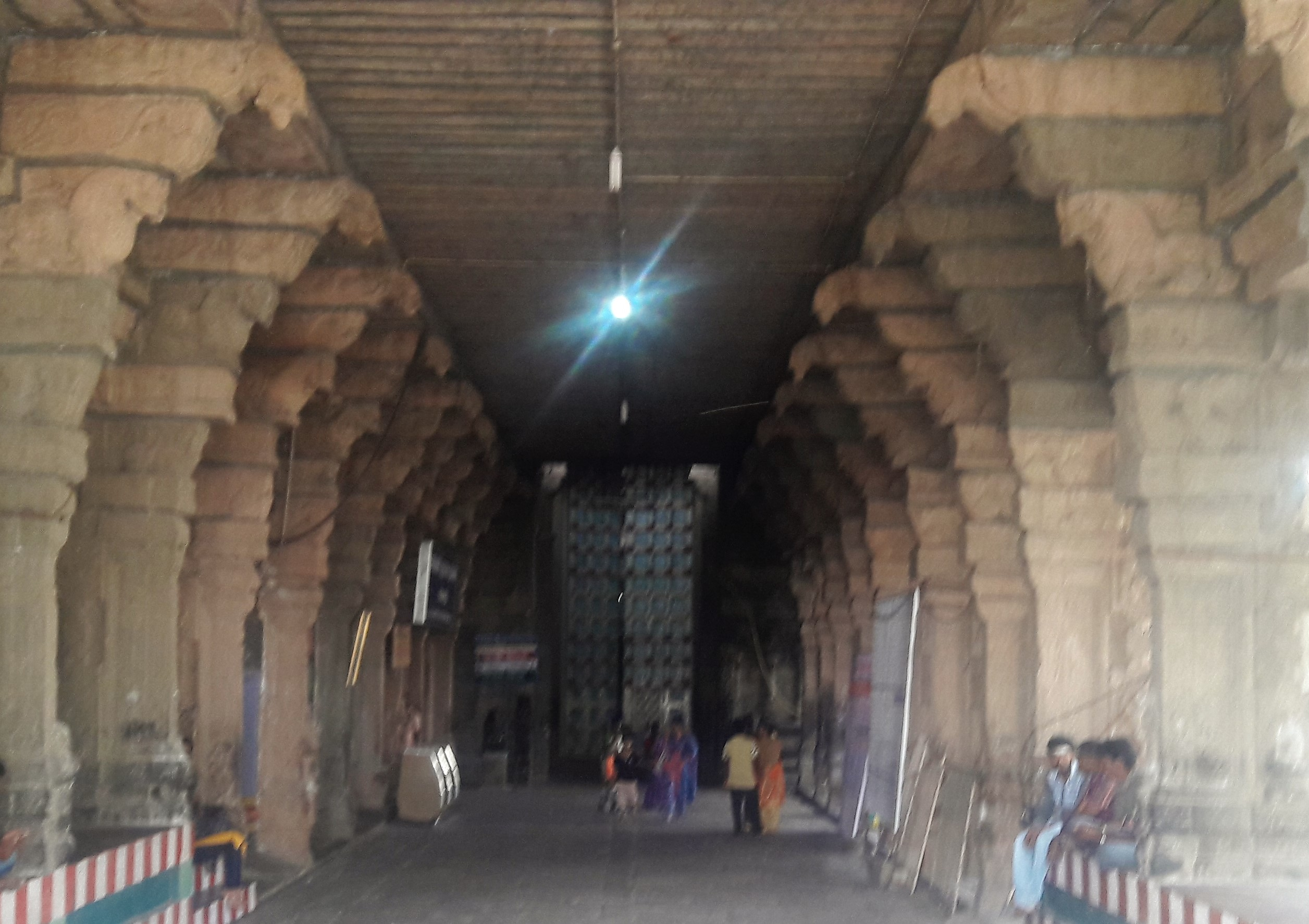
The shrines of the temple

Madavar Valagam is one of the places where Siva is believed to have performed his miracles called Thiruvilaiyadal. On the first day of the Tamil month of Panguni (March–April), the rays of Sun fall on the presiding deity, Vidyanathaswami when special worship is performed to sun on this day.
