= Uravin Kaidigal =

- First edition cover
- Author: J. Jayalalithaa
- Language: Tamil
- Publisher: Kalki
- Publication date: 22 June 1980
- Publication place: India

Uravin Kaidigal (transl. Prisoners of a relationship) is a novel written by J. Jayalalithaa, and published in 1980 by Kalki. It is the Tamil version of the English novel she wrote for the Mumbai-based women's magazine Eve's Weekly. The story follows the relationship between an actor and a college girl.

== Summary ==
Although he is 45, Rajeev Kumar maintained his physique and looks like a 30-year-old man. Apart from acting, he also owns a film distribution company and other businesses. In acting itself, he earns at least ₹70 lakhs per year. For a single film, he gets ₹7 lakhs as remuneration. He is a superstar of the Tamil film industry, who built a perfect star image by pretending to be a compassionate person onscreen and offscreen. He has no family. He is carefree and often spends most nights casually with random women. Even if those girls try to convince him to get into a relationship, he'd just dump them by giving them some costly diamond jewelery or expensive gifts.

One day, 9 college girls aged 17-18 visited Rajeev's house to invite him as a chief guest for their college annual day. At first he was not interested, but once he noticed one of the students, Usha, begin speaking, he was completely drawn to her, admiring her beauty. He felt a special and unique attraction towards Usha. He agreed to attend the annual day. In the process, he asked and found out Usha's name. Before leaving his house, he said bye and particularly made eye contact with Usha, making her realise the attraction he felt for her.

Rajeev attended the annual day to meet Usha again, but he could not find her in the college campus, leaving him disappointed. However, he became enthusiastic when he saw Usha portraying Shakuntala on stage. After the play, he praised Usha's performance. To maintain his star image, he also praised the other girls, even though he had not paid attention to them during the play. At the end of the event, he longed to talk to Usha for at least a minute, but he was surrounded by students and professors, making him regret being a superstar for the first time. As he could not meet her alone, Rajeev wrote his private unlisted telephone number on a paper and ordered his manager Suresh to give it to Usha. Suresh met her at the dressing room, gave the paper to her, and asked her to read it when she was alone, then left. Once he left, she read the note and understood that the message was written by Rajeev. She could not believe that a superstar like Rajeev was in love with her.

Rajeev waited for Usha's call, but she did not contact him for the past two days, making him question Suresh whether he had given the note to her or not. Suddenly, the telephone rang, and it was Usha. As they talked, he found out that she is from Srirangam, stays in a college hostel in Madras, and her mother is a widow. When he said he wanted to meet her alone, she fell silent and did not reply, no matter how many times he called her, prompting him to panic as he may have unknowingly scared her. She broke the silence and told him that she was afraid of the hostel rules and explained why. As they talked, he asked if she could meet him, and she said she could only go out on Saturdays and Sundays. Since it was Saturday, he asked if he could meet her that day. She said she usually got permission to visit her friend Poornima's house, so he told her to use that as an excuse and meet him.

Mala, a debut actress appearing in Rajeev's film, is making her Tamil debut. She had appeared in a few Kannada and Malayalam films before debuting in Tamil. Mala and her mother's intention is to seduce him and use the opportunity to achieve fame and money. She approached Rajeev on the shooting set, but he avoided her. Around 5 o'clock, he made an excuse and reached his house, waiting for Usha's telephone call. Usha called him and told him she'd meet him on Sunday, admitting she'd never done anything like this before. He convinced her that he'd take care of everything.

On Sunday, Suresh picked her up in a car and secretly dropped her off at the back entrance of Rajeev's house. As Rajeev saw Usha from the balcony, he exclaimed, "So, my little princess is here at last! Welcome, sweetheart!" He took her inside his room and expressed his love for her. It became a routine for Usha and Rajeev to meet every Saturday and Sunday. To meet her, he avoided film shootings and events. They became closer, and he felt that she was the one. During one of their meetings, she asked why he had never married, and he replied that he had been married twenty years back. She persistently asked him to tell her about his previous marriage. He revealed that it was long before he entered the cinema; he added that within one and a half years, his wife had divorced him and left him, and he did not know whether she was alive or not.

Rajeev revealed that he was born in Aruppukkottai, Madurai. Rajeev's elder brother, who worked in America, had married an American woman and settled down in America. His brother had sent a letter mentioning that he had no intention of returning to India. So, his parents begged Rajeev to marry the girl they chose. To comfort his parents, Rajeev married the girl, Kamala. Kamala was the daughter of a rich person in their village. After the marriage, Kamala's father revealed that Kamala had aversions to men because her father had had an illicit affair, which was the reason why Kamala's mother had killed herself.

Kamala and Rajeev moved to Madras, where he was working as an engineer. There, they led an unhappy relationship due to Kamala's prejudice against men. One year later, during a spiritual tour, Kamala's father and Rajeev's parents died in an accident. Kamala showed no sorrow at her father's demise. Instead, she became suspicious and accused Rajeev of cheating with the girl downstairs in their residence. At some point, out of anger, he spent the night with the girl downstairs, prompting Kamala to take her things and leave. After she left, he tried to convince her through letters and visited her four times, but she never allowed him to see her. Within one and a half years, they were divorced with the help of their lawyers.

After explaining his past, Rajeev asked Usha to marry him, and she agreed, saying they could convince her mother, Kalyani, during her examination holidays.

In the hostel, while taking her books, she found the diary where she used to mark the dates of her periods. Looking at it, she realised her last period was on 5 March and she'd missed her periods for two months, as it was 1 May. She informed Rajeev through a telephone call, and they consulted a lady doctor, who confirmed Usha was pregnant. Delighted, he told her he'd meet Usha's mother and convince her about the marriage. She explained that her mother was strange and might not agree to the marriage because she was overprotective of her. Still, she agreed as Rajeev was persistently asking to meet her mother.

Later, Suresh informed Rajeev through the intercom that director Nanthagopalan had died. Nanthagopalan was the one who had introduced Rajeev as an actor, so he was like a father figure to him. To attend the funeral, Rajeev had to stay in Madras for a week to ease his mind. He told her that within a week, he'd meet Usha's mother in Srirangam.

Usha returned to Srirangam. Kalyani noticed that Usha was uneasy and vomiting, which prompted her to confront Usha about it. Usha hesitantly revealed that she was pregnant. At first, they argued, and Usha told her that except for her lover's age, everything was more than what Kalyani might have expected for her daughter's potential groom. She revealed that her lover was actor Rajeev Kumar and showed her his photo, which shocked Kalyani, causing her to faint. Later, when Kalyani recovered, she tried to convince Usha to abort the child, saying the marriage could not happen without revealing the reason.

Losing her temper, Usha asked why she had to do what her mother said, and told her she was eighteen. Being a legal adult, she could marry whomever she wanted. Due to Usha's persistence, Kalyani revealed that Rajeev was Usha's father. Usha questioned how Rajeev could be her father when Kalyani's husband's name was Prakash. Kalyani revealed that Rajeev's birth name was Prakash and Rajeev Kumar was his stage name. She also revealed that her original name was Kamala and she'd been moved from Aruppukkottai to Srirangam to avoid her relatives talking ill about her. Shocked and disheartened, Usha locked herself in her room. She did not open the door when Kalyani asked her to, but replied that she wanted to be alone. In the morning, Usha's dead body was recovered from the well behind the house. Usha had killed herself, unable to bear the revelation.

As promised, Rajeev drove his car to Srirangam on the seventh day. When he reached Kalyani Ammal's house, he was shocked to find his ex-wife Kamala was Usha's mother. Kamala had been pregnant during their divorce, which he was unaware of till now. Kamala told him that his lust had made him ruin his own daughter, that Usha had killed herself by drowning. Shocked and enraged, Rajeev blamed Kamala for everything, saying that if he'd known Kamala was pregnant, he'd have never allowed her to divorce him. He added that her prejudice had killed their daughter, and he left.

Two days later, a newspaper article revealed that Rajeev had killed himself by consuming sleeping pills. He had written a will stating that his properties should be shared with his employees. A few days later, Kalyani ended up in a mental asylum.

== Characters ==
- Usha, a college student
- Rajeev, an actor
- Kalyani, a 38-year-old woman and Usha's mother
- Suresh, Rajeev's manager and PRO
- Miss Mythree, a 50-year-old unmarried movie buff and college principal, is a Rajeev fanatic and loves him one-sidedly
- Mala, an actress
- Poornima, Usha's best friend
- Palaniyappa, a car driver who works at Kalyani's house
- Thangam, an aged cook who works at Kalyani's house

== Development ==
J. Jayalalithaa was interested in writing novels since her childhood. During the end of her acting career, she developed an aversion towards the film industry. Based on her experiences, she wrote the novel in English for the Mumbai-based women's magazine Eve's Weekly. Kalki Rajendran, who read the English version, requested her to write the same in Tamil. Upon his request, Jayalalithaa wrote the Tamil version of it under the title Uravin Kaidigal for Kalki.

== Release and reception ==
Uravin Kaidigal was published on 22 June 1980 by the Tamil magazine Kalki. Although it received praise for its bold theme, readers criticised it for its incestuous plot. Both Jayalalithaa and Kalki received numerous letters from readers expressing their disbelief and criticism that Kalki published such a story in their magazine.
