= Kalasalingam Academy of Research and Education =

University in Krishnankoil, Tamil Nadu, India

- Other name: KARE
- Former name: Arulmigu Kalasalingam College of Engineering (1984–2006)
- Type: Private & Deemed University
- Established: 1984
- Affiliations: UGC, NAAC, AICTE, NBA
- Chairman: T. Kalasalingam
- Chancellor: Dr. K. Sridharan
- Vice-Chancellor: Dr. S. Narayanan
- Location: Krishnankoil, Tamil Nadu, India; 9.5743°N 77.6761°E
- Campus: Rural, 200 acres (81 ha)
- Colors: Blue
- Website: kalasalingam.ac.in

Kalasalingam Academy of Research and Education (KARE), formerly Arulmigu Kalasalingam College of Engineering and Kalasalingam University, is a private deemed to be university located in Krishnankoil near Rajapalayam in Tamil Nadu, India. The campus is close to the ancient temple town of Srivilliputhur.

== History ==
Kalasalingam Academy of Research and Education was established in 1984 by the Kalasalingam Anandam Ammal Charities. "Kalvi vallal" Thiru T. Kalasalingam, was the founder chairman. It was granted deemed to be university status in 2006. In November 2017, following a directive by the University Grants Commission (UGC) to drop the "University" from the name it was renamed Kalasalingam Academy of Research and Education.

== Location ==
Kalasalingam Academy of Research and Education is situated at Krishnankoil, 65 km (40 mi) south of Madurai and 10 km (6.2 mi) north of Srivilliputhur, in Madurai-Shenkottah National Highway (NH208). The location is at the foothills of the Western Ghats in a rural setting of Virudhunagar District.

== Courses offered ==
The Deemed to be university offers Bachelor of Technology (BTech) and Master of Technology (M.TECH.) degrees in the following fields:

- Aeronautical Engineering
- Agricultural Engineering
- Automobile Engineering
- Biomedical Engineering
- Biotechnology
- Chemical Engineering
- Civil Engineering
- Computer Science and Engineering
- Electronics and Communication Engineering
- Electrical and Electronics Engineering
- Electronics and Instrumentation Engineering
- Food Engineering
- Information and Communication Technology
- Information Technology
- Manufacturing Engineering
- Mechanical Engineering
- [B.sc.Mathemathics with Computer Application]

== Central and departmental libraries ==
- Extensive collection of academic volumes and titles
- Popular periodicals
- National and international journals
- Supplementary digital resources (CD-ROMs and audio cassette equivalent)

== Campus ==
The Deemed to be University sporting facilities include an athletic track, basketball courts, tennis courts and a football ground. The campus is WiFi enabled and available with a SunFire 4800 enterprise server, a SunFire T1000 server, six IBM Blade servers, four Wipro rack servers, six desktop servers (from HP and HCL), and nine TB of storage for the computing and storage needs of the faculty and students. The central server farm includes file servers, a database server, a mail server, a web server, a backup server, a proxy server, and an e-learning server.

== Examination system ==
The academic year is divided into two semesters named as Even and Odd. Each semester has three internal exams and one final exam (semester exam) for all theory subjects. Generally, semester exam questions are from Anna University. Laboratory courses usually have two internal exams followed by the final exam. Most of the exams are theoretical, similar to other engineering colleges in India. It follows the Choice Based Credit System (CBCS).

=== Rankings ===
College rankings

General – India
- NIRF (Overall) (2024): 50
- NIRF (Universities) (2024): 30

Engineering – India
- NIRF (2024): 36

Kalasalingam Academy of Research and Education was ranked 36th among engineering colleges, 50th Overall and 30h among universities by the National Institutional Ranking Framework (NIRF) in 2024.
