= Koomapatti =

Koomapatti கூமாப்பட்டி
- Village
- Location within Tamil Nadu Location within India
- Coordinates: 9°38′40″N 77°35′53″E
- Country: India
- State: Tamil Nadu
- District: Virudhunagar
- Taluk: Watrap

Government
  - Type: Local government of Tamil Nadu

Population (2011)
  - Total: 12.700
- Time zone: UTC+5:30 (IST)
- Postal code: 626133
- Website: Koomapatti Panchayat

Koomapatti or Koomapatty is a village in Watrap taluk of Virudhunagar district, Tamil Nadu, India. It is located in the foothills of the Western Ghats, 5 kilometres (3.1 mi) west of Vathirairuppu.

== Local landmarks ==
Muthalamman Temple and Sappani Muthaiah Temple are in Koomapatti.

Koomapatti is near Pilavakkal Periyar dam, whose impoundment lake has created a beautiful park, but in 2025, tourists attracted by social media posts were disappointed because the park was closed following a drowning.
