= Anaikuttam Dam =

Dam in Tamil Nadu, India

Coordinates: 9.5087°N 77.8208°E

- Interactive map of Anaikuttam Dam
- Country: india
- Location: Virudhunagar District, Tamil Nadu, India
- Purpose: Irrigation
- Opening date: 1989

Dam and spillways
- Type of dam: Earth fill dam
- Height (foundation): 9.5 meters
- Length: 2,940 m (9,650 ft)

Anaikuttam Dam is a dam situated in Tamil Nadu's Virudhunagar district. The dam is built on the Arjuna River. Anaikuttam Dam finished its construction in 1989. This remarkable structure has been a lifeline for the region, providing irrigation, clean energy, and drinking water to the communities it serves

== Capacity ==
Anaikuttam Dam is a significant engineering feat, characterized by its earthen construction. The dam stretches an impressive 2,940 meters in length and stands at a height of 9.5 meters, forming a reservoir that harnesses the flow of the Arjuna River. The design and construction of the dam are a testament to meticulous planning and execution, aimed at effectively managing water resources for the benefit of the region's inhabitants.

The dam provides drinking water to the Virudhunagar district. According to a news article published in 2020, the dam had the capacity to give 2 million litres of water to Virudhunagar every day.

== Challenges and accountability ==
While Anaikuttam Dam has brought numerous benefits, its journey has not been without challenges. In 2015, an investigation was launched against officials from the Public Works Department (PWD) due to alleged negligence in maintaining the dam. These accusations raised concerns about wastage of water and highlighted the need for responsible management and upkeep of vital infrastructure. Such incidents underscore the importance of effective governance and maintenance to ensure the long-term viability of such critical resources.
