= Mathankovil patti =

Village in Tamil Nadu, India

Coordinates: 9.3832°N 77.7158°E

Mathankovilpatti is a small village in Vembakottai, Tamil Nadu. It has a population of over 2000.
