= Krishnankoil =

Village in Tamil Nadu, India

Coordinates: 9.5653°N 77.6891°E

Krishnankoil is a small village located in Virudhunagar District, in the state of Tamil Nadu, India. It is located near the town of Srivilliputhur and the NH208 (national Highway) and is an educational hub of the West Virudhunagar district.

The name Krishnankoil is made of two words Krishna and kovil. Kovil in Tamil language means temple. So the name means Krishna's temple.

== Demography ==
=== Language ===
Tamil language is the local language here. English is taught in schools.

== Education ==
- Kalasalingam Academy of Research and Education
- VPMM Women's College of Engineering

== Transport ==
Krishnankoil is located on Kollam - Tirumangalam national highways.There are frequent bus services to Madurai, Theni, Virudhunagar & Tenkasi from Krishnankoil.
