= Aruppukkottai =

- Town
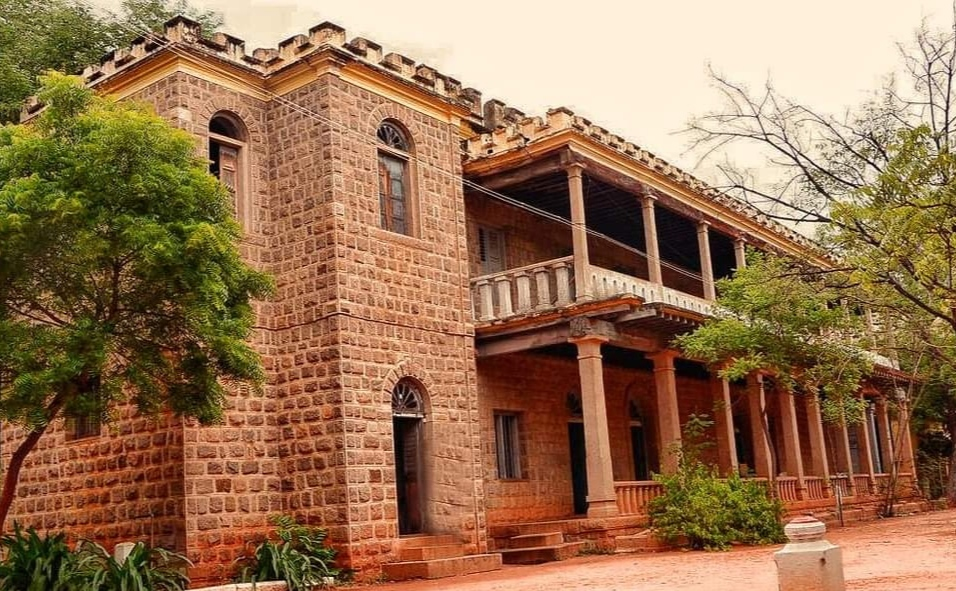
- Nickname: Aruvai
- Aruppukottai, Tamil Nadu
- Coordinates: 9.5139°N 78.1002°E
- Country: India
- State: Tamil Nadu
- Region: Madurai
- District: Virudhunagar

Government
  - Type: First Grade Municipality
  - Body: Aruppukottai Municipality

Area
  - Total: 14.96 km^{2} (5.78 sq mi)
- Elevation: 123 m (404 ft)

Population (2011)
  - Total: 87,722
  - Density: 5,864/km^{2} (15,190/sq mi)

Languages
  - Official: Tamil
- Time zone: UTC+5:30 (IST)
- PIN: 626101, 626105, 626107, 626112
- Telephone code: 04566
- Vehicle registration: TN-67

Aruppukottai is a Town in Virudhunagar district in the state of Tamil Nadu, India. Aruppukottai's classical name is "Sengattu irukkai idathuvali". Aruppukottai is about 50 km from Madurai. It is in the middle of Vellore-Tuticorin National Highways NH-38. The villages and towns surrounding Aruppukottai makes this as a major town as well as a major transit hub and they are also famous for production of jasmine. Aruppukottai is always famous for producing yarn. Sri Ramana Maharishi was born in Tiruchuli near Aruppukottai town. Aruppukottai was part of king Sethupathi of Ramnad. King Sethupathi has Zamin Palace in Palyampatti. As of 2011, the town had a population of 87,722. The town also hosts two famous temples – Arulmigu Meenakshi Chokkanatha Swamy Temple built in 13th century by Pandiya King Maravarma Sundarapandiyan and Seenivasa Perumal Temple Built on the top of Malai arasan Hill.

== Geography ==
The climate is dry and hot, with rains during October–December. Temperatures during summer reach a maximum of 41 °C and a minimum of 27 °C. Winter temperatures range between 31 °C and 19 °C. The average temperature of the area is measured as 36 °C. The average annual rainfall is about 70 cm. It is the one and only major town present in the eastern part of virudhunagar district. It is also the only major town in eastern part of virudhunagar district area which is surrounded by many small towns and villages.

== Demographics ==
Religious census
Religion	Percent(%)
Hindu	91.47%
Muslim	6.42%
Christian	2.02%
Sikh	0.01%
Other	0.08%

According to 2011 census, Aruppukkottai had a population of 87,722 with a sex ratio of 1,014 females for every 1,000 males, much above the national average of 929. As per the 2001 Census, the town had a population of 85,376, showing a modest growth in the subsequent decade. A total of 7,654 were under the age of six, constituting 3,934 males and 3,720 females. Scheduled Castes and Scheduled Tribes accounted for 7.04% and 0.16% of the population respectively. The average literacy of the district was 82.12%, compared to the national average of 72.99%. The district had a total of 23803 households. There were a total of 37,631 workers, comprising 200 cultivators, 764 main agricultural labourers, 5,227 in house hold industries, 29,788 other workers, 1,652 marginal workers, 20 marginal cultivators, 285 marginal agricultural labourers, 214 marginal workers in household industries and 1,133 other marginal workers.

== Economy ==
Aruppukottai acts mainly as an educational and commercial hub for the surrounding villages. It is noted for its cotton industries mainly spinning mills. Rice mills and limestone industries, hand loom, power loom, printing press, and some small-scale industries such as school note book and daily calendar manufacturing. Hand loom, power loom is the main job. Major employers are spinning mills, weaving sectors (handloom and powerloom), rice mills, private transport and government sector apart from agriculture. Aruppukottai has mixed population town. Aruppukottai was once known for its handloom weaving industry and for Agricultural Millets very much famous.

== Education ==
Virudhunagar district continued to be on the top in the State in Plus Two and SSLC examination results for more than three decades now. In the SSLC exam conducted in 2010, Aruppukottai educational district tops all the 68 educational districts in the State with a record success rate of 97.51%. Forty schools, including record 24 Government schools, produced centum results in the Aruppukottai educational district alone. Main reasons for this are the sustained monitoring of individual schools and the competition among the students in scoring high marks.

Recently, an e-smart classroom was launched by Ex-Minister for Information and Technology Poongothai Aladi Aruna and School Education Ex-Minister Thangam Thennarasu at a Government Higher Secondary School in Mallankinaru near Aruppukottai. Recently a CBSE school was opened in the city.

On seeing success of Virudhunagar district, teams from Trichy district will visit schools to study best practices in Virudhunagar district that has been maintaining the first position for the last two decades. According to the CEO of Trichy district, Mr. T. Mohanakumar,

Headmasters and subject teachers from top-notch schools in Virudhunagar district will also be invited to Trichy to guide their counterparts to scale up their performance.

== Health ==
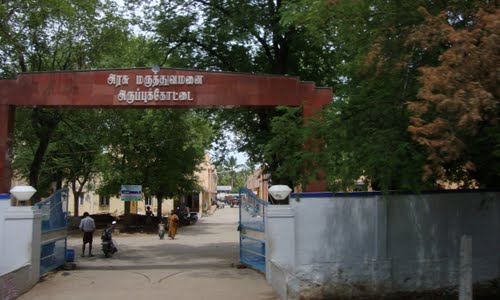
Apk gh entrance

Aruppukottai has one government hospital with Government Headquarters status with 150 beds for in-patients and also two government primary health care centers and many private hospitals.

== Justice ==
Aruppukottai is a revenue division in Virudunagar district. There is a Revenue division officer/sub divisional magistrate. There are five police stations for the public convenience One Is DSP Office, the second one is Taluk Police Station, third is For Town Police Station, fourth one is traffic police station and the fifth one is All Women police Station. A Sub-Court, a District Munsif Court and a Judicial Magistrate Court are functioning in Aruppukottai, and are located in a Combined Court Complex.

== Local administration ==
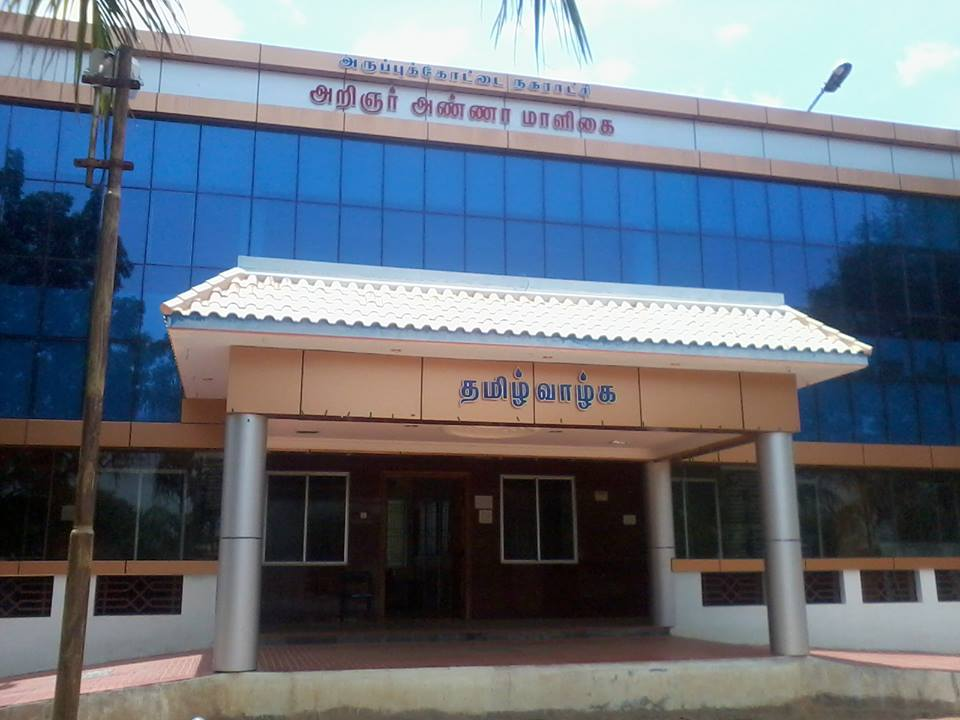
Aruppukottai municipal office

Aruppukottai Municipality is formed with three improvement areas called by name Periya Puliampatti, Chinna Puliampatti and Aruppukottai town. The area of this Municipalilty is 14.96 sq. km. As per G.O.M.S No.1978, Town Planning and Local Administration dated 28.11.1947, Aruppukottai Panchayat was upgraded to the Third Grade Municipality with effect from 1948 and subsequently it was upgraded to the Second grade Municipality, as per G.O.No.363 dated 1.04.1953. This Municipality is upgraded to the First Grade Municipality from 2.06.1979 as per G.O.No.876dated 2-6-1979. As per G.O.NO. 135 dated 11.06.1996, Aruppukottai Municipality has been divided into 36 wards

== Transportation ==
=== Roadways ===
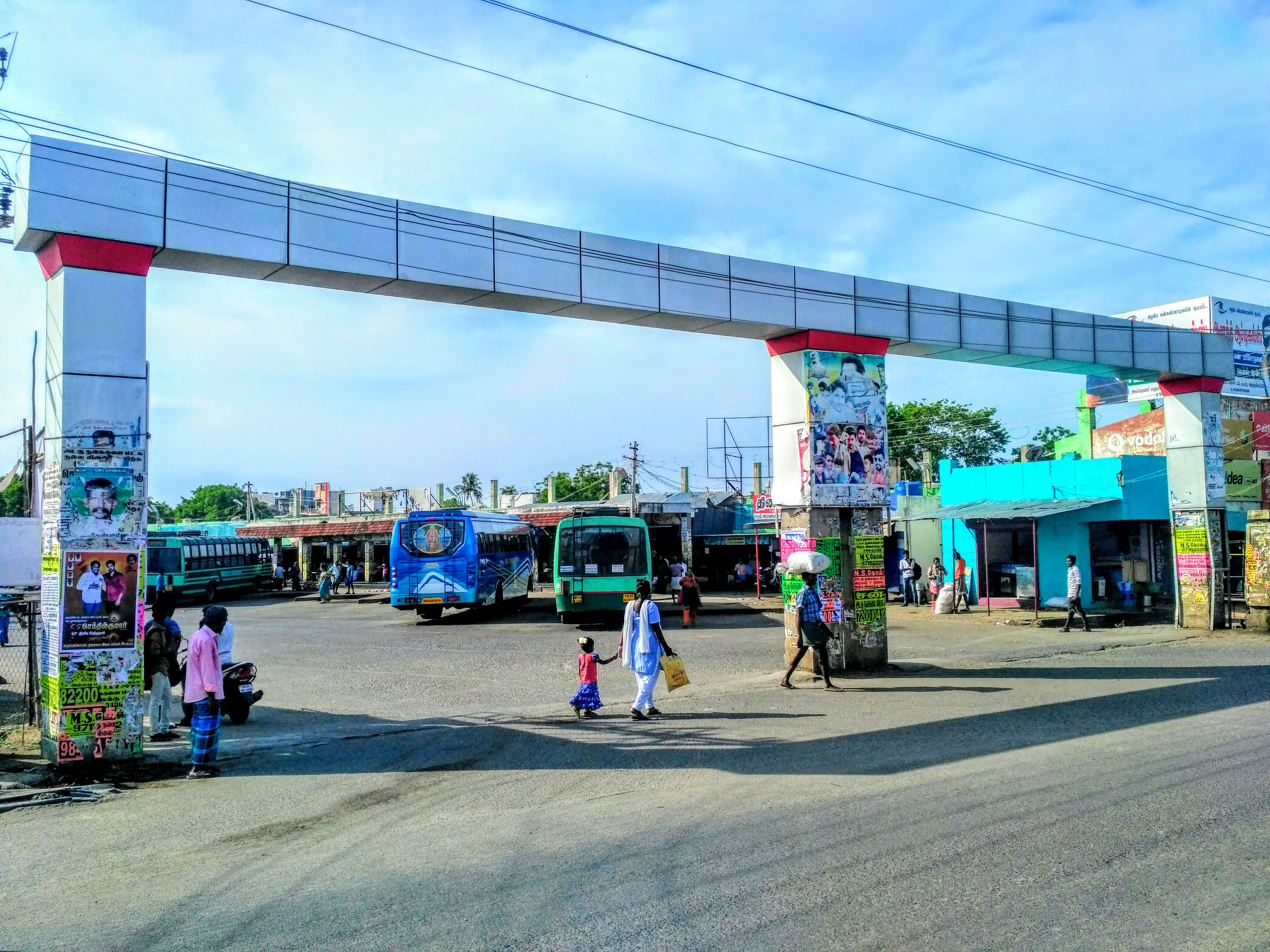
Apk New Bus Stand

Aruppukottai acts as a hub connecting Madurai, Thoothukudi, Virudhunagar, Tirunelveli, Kovilpatti, Rajapalayam, Sivagangai, Ramanathapuram, Manamadurai and Rameswaram. Aruppukottai which is well connected by roads.

Madurai the 3rd biggest city in Tamil Nadu by population, is only 50 km away. NH 38 runs between Vellore - Thoothukudi, an important freight-route, connecting Trichy, Madurai and Thoothukkudi runs through Aruppukottai.

=== Railways ===
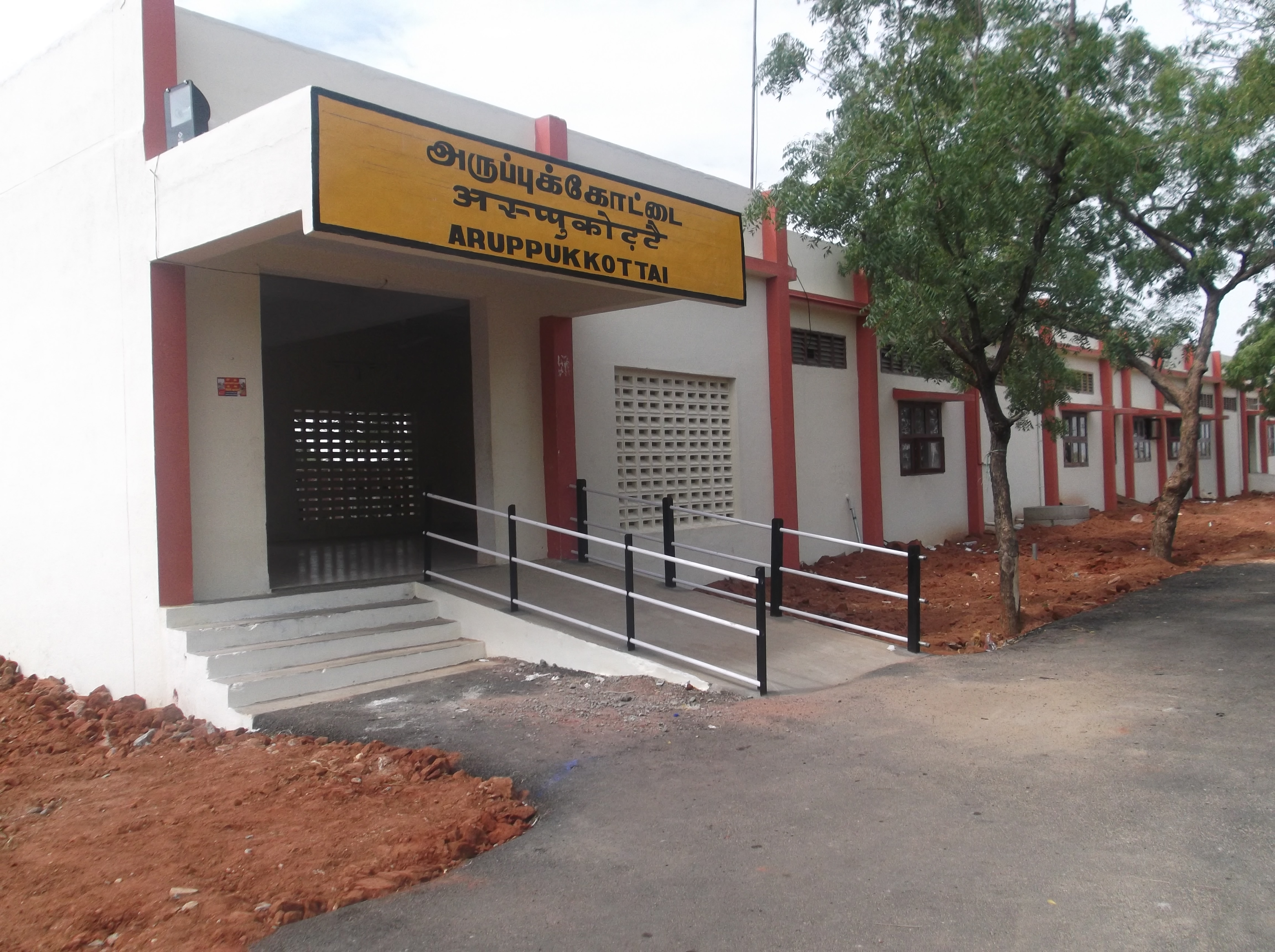
APK railway station

Aruppukottai Railway station has a broad gauge railway line that connects to Manamadurai and Virudhunagar. It is the main route to connecting south districts to delta districts, and it is the route Virudhunagar–Aruppukottai-Manamadurai–Karaikudi–Trichy/Mayiladuthurai alternate route for Virudhunagar–Madurai–Dindigul-Trichy to Chennai. Further more now Indian Railways starting a new railway line between Madurai to Thoothukudi New railway line through Madurai–Thiruparankundram–Kariapatti–Aruppukottai–Vilathikulam–Thoothukudi this line make Aruppukottai railway station as railway junction.

=== Airways ===
Madurai International Airport is just 44 km away and Thoothukudi Airport is 102 km away from Aruppukottai town.

=== Waterways ===
The nearest seaport is the V.O. Chidambaranar Port Authority located 100 km (62 mi) away.

== Politics ==
Elected members
Member of Legislative Assembly	Thiru. K.K.S.S.R.Ramachandhran
Member of Parliament	Thiru. Manickam Tagore
Municipality Chairman and Vice chairman
Chairman	Thirumathi. S.Sundaralakshmi
Vice-chairman	Thiru. G.Palanichamy
Municipality Commissioner
Commissioner	Thiru. G.Ashok kumar

Aruppukottai state assembly constituency is part of Virudhunagar Lok Sabha Constituency. Aruppukottai is a separate constituency of legislative election.

- In 1952 & 1962 Pasumpon U. Muthuramalinga Thevar was elected MP from Aruppukottai parliament constituency
- M. G. Ramachandran (MGR) became first time as chief minister of Tamil Nadu, when he got selected from Aruppukottai constituency.

== Adjacent communities ==
- AAndukondan, village 30 km from Aruppukottai
- Palavanatham, village 12.3 km from Aruppukottai
- Tiruchuzhi, small town near Aruppukottai
- Kariapatti, small town near Aruppukottai
- Kalkurichi, small town near Aruppukottai 12 Km
