= Kallamanaickerpatti =

- village

Kallamanaickenpatti is a panchayat town in Virudhunagar district in the Indian state of Tamil Nadu.

== Facilities ==
Government Higher Secondary school,

Government Hospital, 

Cooperative Bank, Post Office, TNEB AE Office, E-Seva center, Govt primary school, Anganwadi. Nearest Police Station is in Alangulam govt library,

panchyathu R.O. water station,

== Politics ==
Assembly Constituency : Sattur (Assembly constituency)

Loksabha Constituency : Virudhunagar
