= Chettiarpatti =

- Town
- Location in Tamil Nadu, India
- Coordinates: 9°21′56″N 77°29′34″E
- Country: India
- State: Tamil Nadu
- District: Virudhunagar

Population (2001)
  - Total: 13,508

Languages
  - Official: Tamil
- Time zone: UTC+5:30 (IST)

Chettiarpatti is a panchayat town in Virudhunagar district in the state of Tamil Nadu, India.

== Demographics ==
As of 2001 India census, Chettiarpatti had a population of 13,508. Males constitute 50% of the population and females 50%. Chettiarpatti has an average literacy rate of 66%, higher than the national average of 59.5%; with male literacy of 75% and female literacy of 58%. 12% of the population is under 6 years of age.
