= P. Selvam (TVK politician) =

P. Selvam is an Indian politician and member of Tamilaga Vettri Kazhagam (TVK). He is the elected Member of the Legislative Assembly (MLA) for the Virudhunagar Assembly constituency in Virudhunagar district, Tamil Nadu, having won the seat in the 2026 Tamil Nadu Legislative Assembly election.
