= Arjuna River =

River in Virudunager district, Tamilnadu, India

Coordinates: 9°28′9.7″N 77°53′28″E

Arjuna is a river flowing in the Virudhunagar district of the Indian state of Tamil Nadu. it is a sacred river which formed during the period of the Pandavas. Arjuna one of the five Pandavas along this river to worship lord Shiva. There is a large Shiva temple named Kasi Viswanatha temple on the side of this river near Watrap.

The Anaikuttam Dam was built on this river in 1989. This dam is situated at Sivakasi to Virudhunagar highway.

== See also ==
List of rivers of Tamil Nadu
