= South Kodikulam =

- Town
- Location in Tamil Nadu, India
- Coordinates: 9°39′22″N 77°35′41″E
- Country: India
- State: Tamil Nadu
- District: Virudhunagar

Population (2001)
  - Total: 11,975

Languages
  - Official: Tamil
- Time zone: UTC+5:30 (IST)

South Kodikulam is a panchayat town in Virudhunagar district in the Indian state of Tamil Nadu.

== Demographics ==
As of 2011 India census, Sapthur Kodikulam had a population of 17,975. Males constitute 50% of the population and females 50%. Sapthur Kodikulam has an average literacy rate of 66%, more than the national average of 59.5%: male literacy is 48%, and female literacy is 42%. In South Kodikulam, 10% of the population is under 6 years of age.
