= Mamsapuram =

- Town
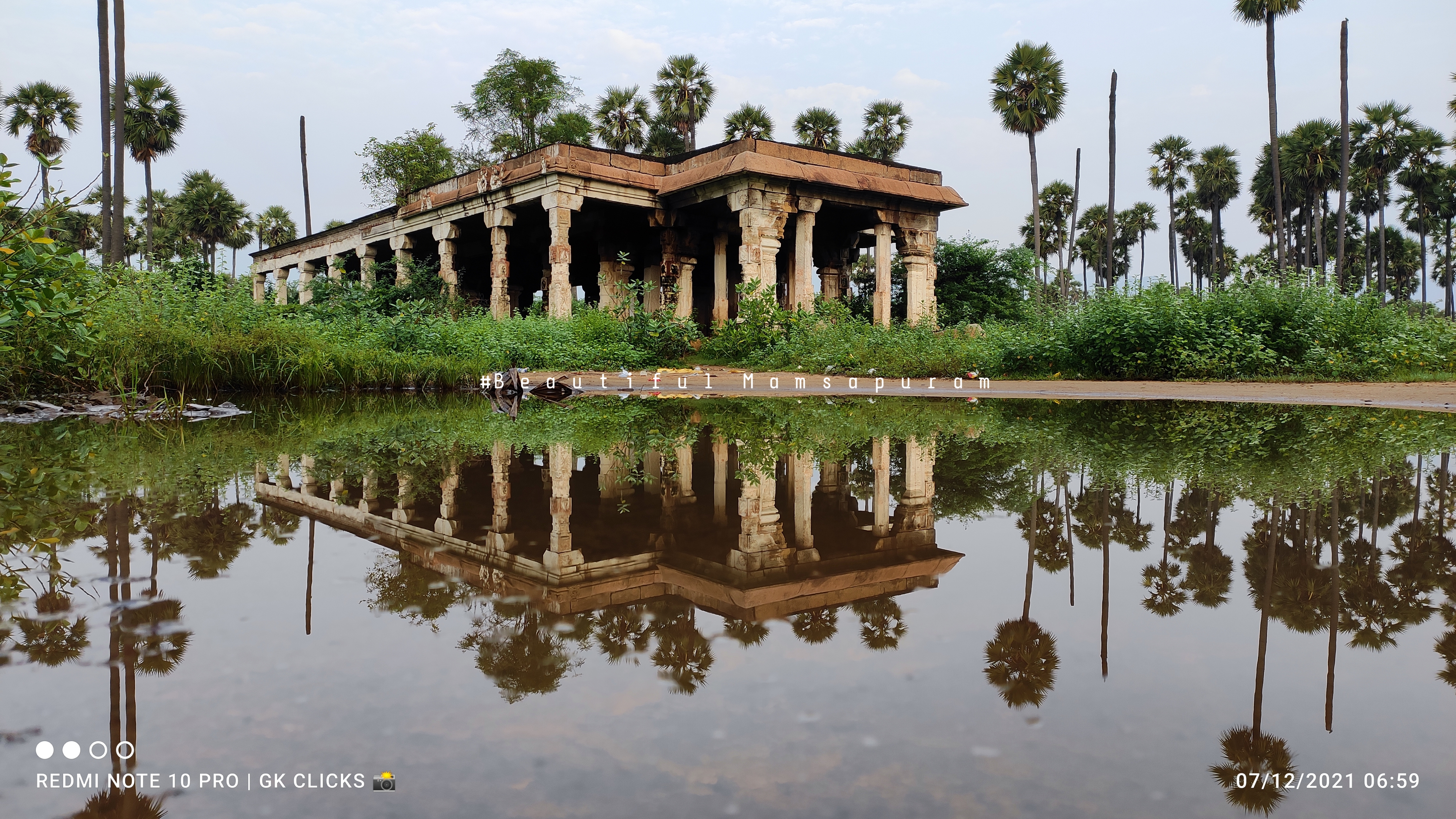
- Mamsapuram Entrance

- Location in Tamil Nadu, India
- Coordinates: 9.500027°N 77.586927°E
- Country: India
- State: Tamil Nadu
- District: Virudhunagar

Population (2001)
  - Total: 17,931
- Time zone: UTC+5:30 (IST)
- Postal code: 626110
- Vehicle registration: TN 84

Mamsapuram is a town located in Srivilliputhur Taluk and comes under Srivilliputtur Assembly constituency & Tenkasi Lok Sabha constituency, Virudhunagar District in the Indian State of Tamil Nadu.

== Demographics ==
As of 2001 India census, Mamsapuram had a population of 17,931. Males constitute 49% of the population and females 51%. Mamsapuram has an average literacy rate of 65%, higher than the national average of 59.5%: male literacy is 74%, and female literacy is 56%. In Mamsapuram, 11% of the population is under 6 years of age.
