= Aruppukkottai division =

Aruppukkottai division is a revenue division in the Virudhunagar district of Tamil Nadu, India. Aruppukottai division Including With Aruppukottai, Virudhunagar, Kariapatti and Tiruchuli Taluks.
