= Andukondan =

Coordinates: 9°37′N 78°17′E

Andukondan is a small village 30 km from Aruppukottai, Tamil Nadu, South India.
