= Kariapatti =

- Town
- Kariapatti (Tamil Nadu) Kariapatti (India)
- Coordinates: 9°40′26.4″N 78°06′08.3″E
- Country: India
- State: Tamil Nadu
- District: Virudhunagar
- Elevation: 116 m (381 ft)

Population (2011)
  - Total: 18,984

Languages
  - Official: Tamil
- Time zone: UTC+5:30 (IST)
- PIN: 626106
- Area code: 04566
- Vehicle registration: TN-67
- Website: http://www.townpanchayat.in/kariapatti

Kariapatti is a town Panchayat city in district of Virudhunagar district, Tamil Nadu. The Kariapatti Town Panchayat has population of 18,984 of which 9,439 are males while 9,545 are females as per report released by Census India 2011. The Kariapatti city is divided into 15 wards for which elections are held every 5 years.

== Geography ==
The city is located between Madurai and Aruppukottai on the National Highway 45B (India, old numbering). Its coordinates are 9.674000°N 78.102300°E It has an average elevation of 116 metres above sea level.

== History ==
The rulers of Palaiyakkarar have divided the Thoopur, Karisalkulam, palayampatti divisions into Zameen zones and Kariapatti was used to be the border for each Zameen. They had used this place as their Business hub.

The place was very popular for the Donkey market. Hence, it was called as Kazhudhaipatti (Kazhudhai - Donkey, Patti - small town). It had been also called as 'Khadhiyarpatti' as there was a temple priest named Kadhiyaar. The place was further famous for a snack Kaara Sevu, as the reason the place was also called as Kaarapatti. Then this became Kariapatti in over time.

== Demographics ==
According to 2011 Census of India, The population of children aged 0-6 is 2082 which is 11.45% of total population of Kariapatti (TP). In Kariapatti Town Panchayat, the female sex ratio is 1012 against the state average of 996. Moreover, the child sex ratio in Kariapatti is around 901 compared to Tamil Nadu state average of 943. The literacy rate of Kariapatti city is 85.79% higher than the state average of 80.09%. In Kariapatti, male literacy is around 91.10% while the female literacy rate is 80.62%.
