= Vembakottai =

- Neighbourhood
- Vembakottai, Virudhunagar, Tamil Nadu
- Coordinates: 9.3343°N 77.7688°E
- Country: India
- State: Tamil Nadu
- District: Virudhunagar
- Elevation: 101.9 m (334 ft)

Languages
  - Official: Tamil, English
  - Speech: Tamil, English
- Time zone: UTC+5:30 (IST)
- PIN: 626131
- Telephone code: +914562******
- Other Neighbourhoods: Vijayakarisalkulam, Thlukkankurichi
- LS: Virudhunagar
- VS: Sattur

Vembakottai is a neighbourhood in Virudhunagar district of Tamil Nadu state in India. Vembakottai is of great importance that archaeological excavation was carried out three times where thousands of artefacts were unearthed there which indicated that people had lived along the banks of Vaippar river, 2000 years ago.

Few carnelian beads that were unearthed from Vembakottai indicates its tade link with Afghanistan.

== Location ==
Vembakottai is located with the coordinates of 9.3343°N 77.7688°E near Sattur.

== Demographics ==
As per 2011 census of India, Vembakottai had a population of 4,478 out of which 2,225 are males and 2253 are females.

== Politics ==
Vembakottai area falls under the Sattur Assembly constituency. Also, this area belongs to Virudhunagar Lok Sabha constituency.
