= Srivilliputhur =

Town in Tamil Nadu, India

Srivilliputhur Thiruvilliputhur
- Town
- Srivilliputhur
- Nickname: City of Diary
- Location in Tamil Nadu, India
- Coordinates: 9.512°N 77.633°E
- Country: India
- State: Tamil Nadu
- Region: Madurai
- District: Virudhunagar

Government
  - Type: First Grade Municipality
  - Body: Srivilliputtur Municipality
- Elevation: 146 m (479 ft)

Population (2011)
  - Total: 75,396

Languages
  - Official: Tamil
- Time zone: UTC+5:30 (IST)
- PIN: 626125, 626135
- Telephone code: 04563
- Vehicle registration: TN-67, TN-84
- Sex ratio: 1:1 ♂/♀

Srivilliputhur is a Town in Virudhunagar district in the Indian state of Tamil Nadu. The most important landmark of Srivilliputhur is 11-tiered tower structure dedicated to the Vatapatrasayee (Vishnu), the presiding deity of the Srivilliputhur Divya Desam. The tower of this temple rises 192 feet high and is the official symbol of the Government of Tamil Nadu. It is said to have been built by Periyalvar, in the year 788 CE and believed to be the adopted father of the temple deity, with a purse of gold that he won in debates held in the palace of Pandya King Vallabhadeva. Srivilliputhur is well known for its ancient heritage and devotional contributions.

It is on the Virudhunagar - Sengottai line of the Southern Railway, about 74 km south of Madurai and connected by road and rail with Madurai, Rajapalayam, Sankarankovil & Sengottai, Sivakasi and Sattur.

== Etymology ==
As per historical legend, the land around Srivilliputhur was under the rule of Queen Malli. The queen had two sons called Villi and Kandan. While the two were hunting in a forest, a tiger killed Kandan. Unaware of this, Villi searched for his brother, got tired and fell asleep. In his dream, divinity narrated to him what happened to his brother. By divine orders, Villi founded a city. The city is originally named after its founder, Villi forming the word Thiru-Villi-Puthur and also known as Mallivalanaadu. Sri is the Sanskrit alternative to Tamil word "Thiru" and that is why it is also called as a Srivilliputhur. Pasurams of Alwars mention this place as Thiruvilliputhur.

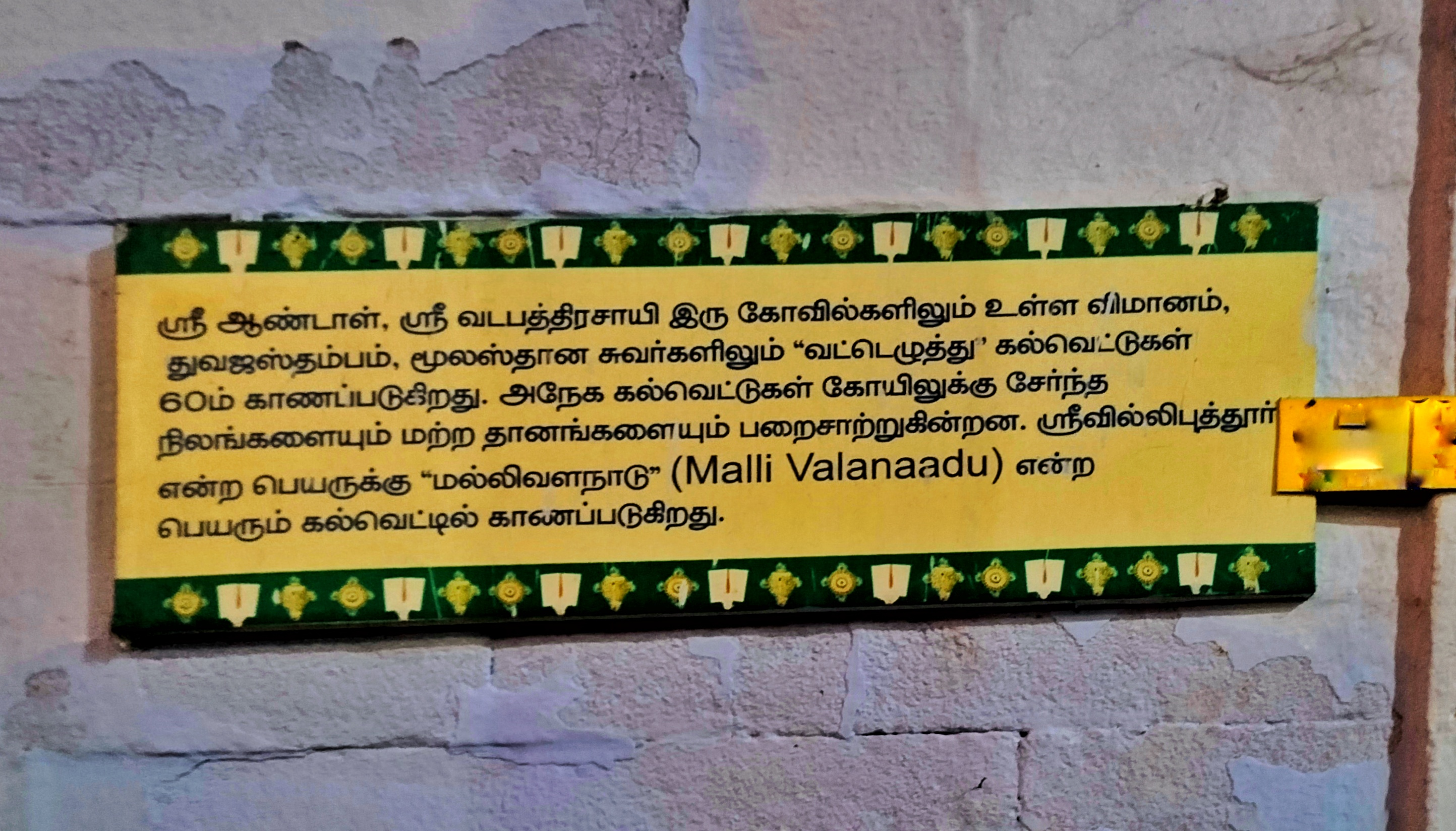
Thiruvilliputthur Andan temple sign board about the stone inscriptions found in the temple

As per another legend, the town is called the town of the bowman from the Tamil word villi meaning bow.

== History ==
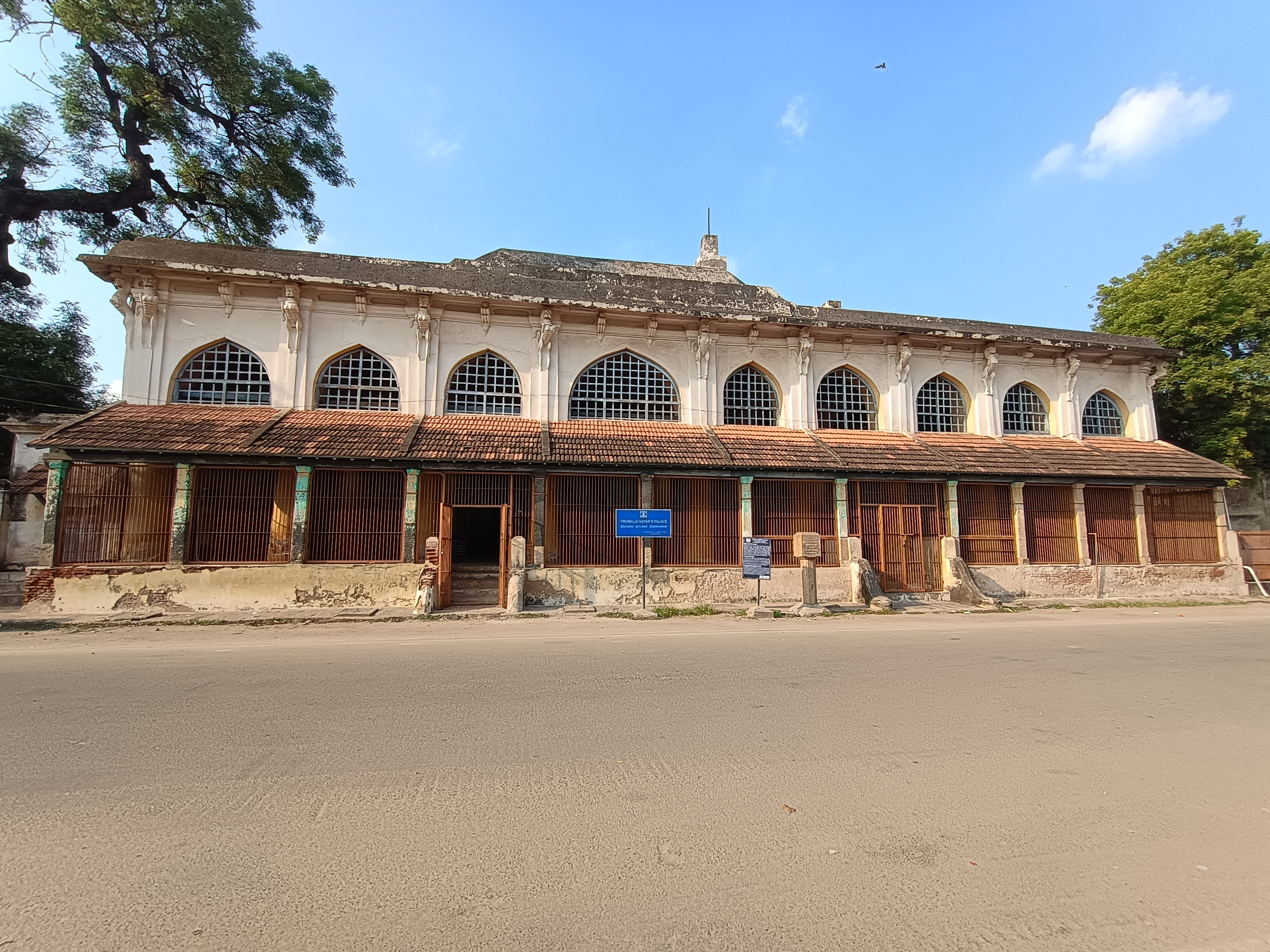
Thirumalai Nayakkar Mahal, Srivilliputhur

The history of Srivilliputhur centres around the Srivilliputhur Temple, dedicated to Andal (8th century or earlier), the only female Alvar of the 12 Alvar saints of South India. She is credited with the Tamil works of Thirupavai and Nachiar Tirumozhi that are still recited by devotees during the Winter festival season of Margazhi. Andal is known for her unwavering devotion to god Vishnu, the God of the Srivaishnavas. Adopted by her father, the Alvar saint Periyalvar who found her as a baby, Andal avoided earthly marriage, the normal and expected path for women of her culture, to "marry" Vishnu, both spiritually and physically. In many places in India, particularly in Tamil Nadu, Andal is treated more than a saint and as a form of god herself and a shrine for Andal is dedicated in most Vishnu temples.

During the reign of Tirumala Nayaka (1623–1659) and Rani Mangammal (1689–1706), this city became very popular. Tirumala Nayaka renovated the temples of this city. Nayak built a palace similar, but smaller in size to that of Thirumalai Nayakkar Palace in Madurai. Entry to this well preserved historical complex is presently restricted by the Archaeological Department of India which is managing this palace complex. From 1751 to 1756 A.D., Srivilliputhur came under the rule of Nerkattumseval palayakkarar Puli thevar and was a maravarpalayam. Later the Fort of Srivilliputhur was ruled by Periyasami Thevar. Then it fell into the hands of Mohammed Yusuf Khan during 1756. The troops of Yusuf won over the Polygars in the region. When they tried to invade Srivilliputhur, a Brahmin fell from the top of the temple tower as a mark of protest. Though Muslims, the troops retreated at the sight of the shattering brain in front of a Hindu temple might draw further wrath. During 1801, there were battles between polygars in the region and the British. One of the rebels, Sivattaiya Nayak was captured in the town during the same year. During February 1811, the town was suffering from an epidemic. Until 1850, Sri Andal temple was under the care of the king of Travancore. The British ruled the country till India attained freedom in 1947.

== Geography ==
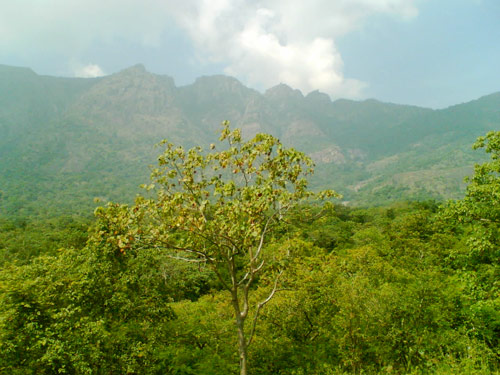
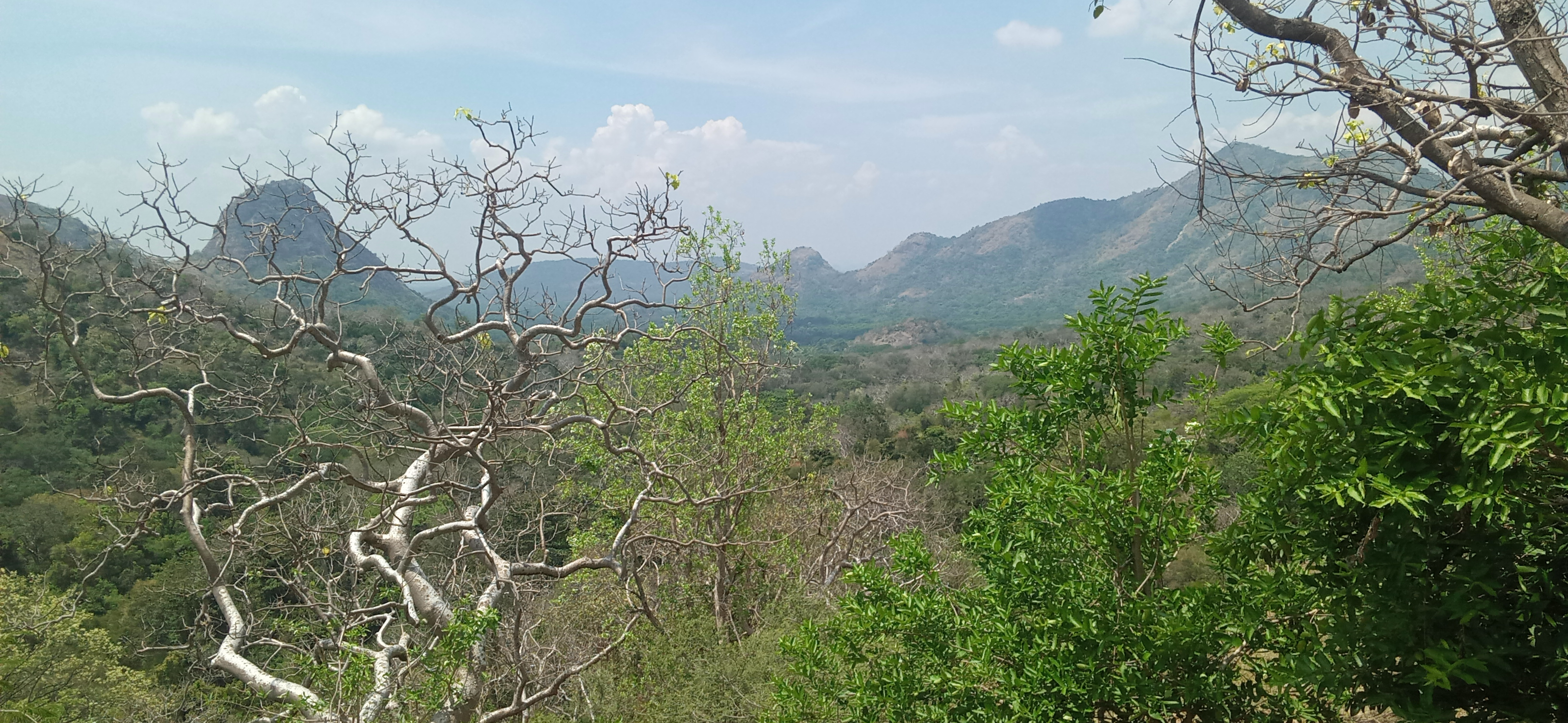

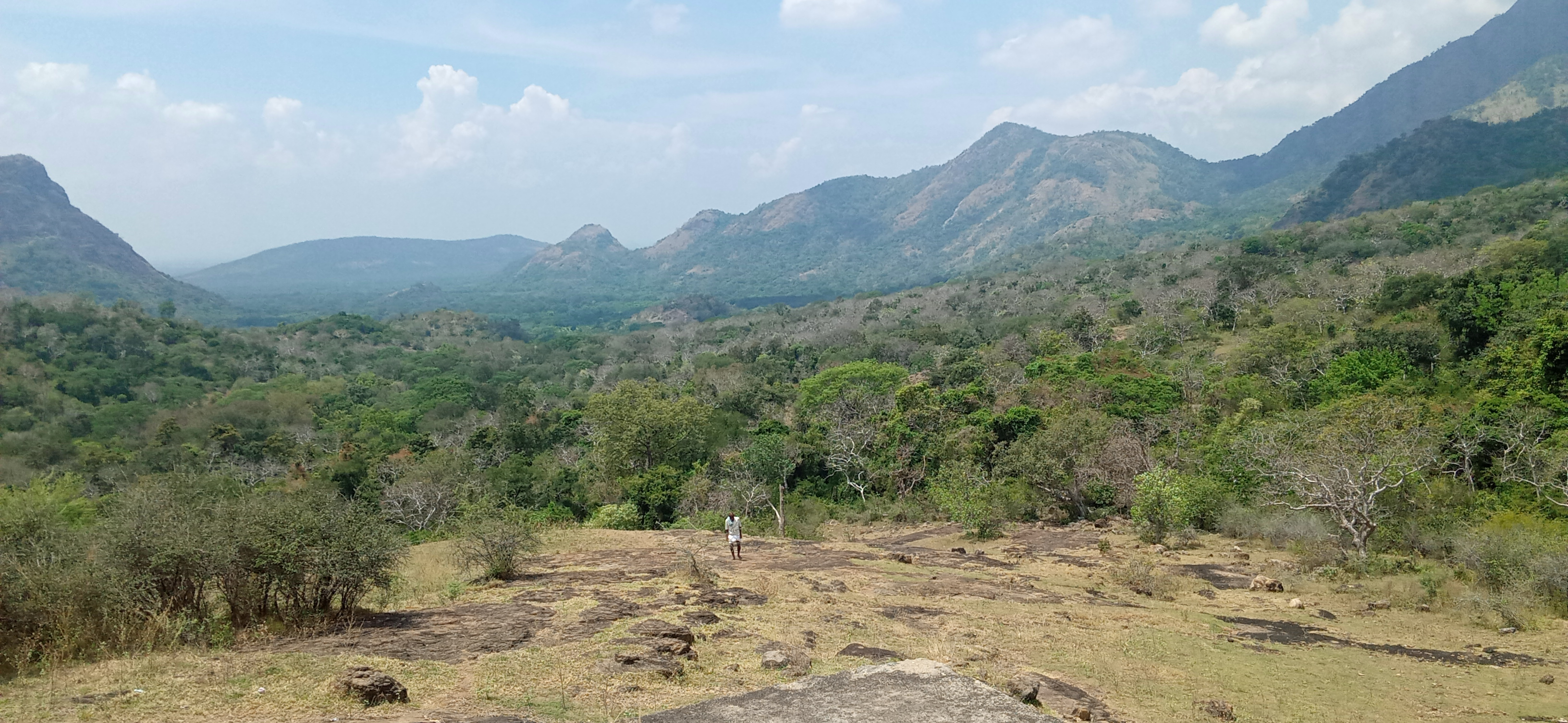
Shenbagathoppu's calm and serene forest. View from Kaattalagar Temple, Thiruvillipuththur.

Srivilliputtur is located at 9.5161°N 77.63°E. The town is located at the foothills of the Western Ghats 77 km (48 mi) south west of Madurai. It has an average elevation of 137.2 metres (450 ft) above mean sea level. There are no notable mineral resources available in and around the town. Srivilliputtur receives scanty rainfall with an average of 811 mm (31.9 in) annually, which is lesser than the state average of 1,008 mm (39.7 in). The South west monsoon, with an onset in June and lasting up to August, brings scanty rainfall. The bulk of the rainfall is received during the North East monsoon in the months of October, November and December.

Shenbaga Thoppu is a forest located 8 km (5.0 mi) west of Srivilliputhur. These forests are found on the eastern slopes of the Western Ghats. Many rare and endemic varieties of flora and fauna are found along the mountain slopes. A wildlife sanctuary, spread over 480 km^{2} (190 sq mi) was established in 1989 at Shenbaga Thoppu. The sanctuary is contiguous with the Periyar tiger reserve on the south-western side and the Megamalai reserve forest on the north-western side. The Combined Srivilliputhur-Meghamalai Reserve Forests announced as India's 51st and Tamil Nadu State's fifth Tiger Reserve Sanctuary. In southern Tamil Nadu, Kottamalai Peak, at around 2,019 m (6,624 ft), is believed to be the tallest peak in Virudunagar district as well. The sanctuary is home to the endangered, arboreal grizzled giant squirrel (Ratufa macrora). The sanctuary also hosts birds, mammals, reptiles and butterflies. Resident and migratory elephants are common. Other animals sighted are tigers, leopards, Nilgiri thar, spotted deer, barking deer, sambar, wild boar, porcupines, Nilgiri langur, lion-tailed macaque, common langur, slender loris, bonnet macaque, sloth bear, gaur (Indian bison) and flying squirrels.

== Demographics ==
Religious census 2011
Religion	Percent(%)
Hindu	90.7%
Muslim	2.27%
Christian	6.62%
Sikh	0.01%
Buddhist	0.01%
Other	0.38%
No religion	0.02%

According to the 2011 census, Srivilliputhur had a population of 75,396 with a sex-ratio of 1,015 females for every 1,000 males, much above the national average of 929. A total of 6,884 were under the age of six, constituting 3,466 males and 3,418 females. Scheduled Castes and Scheduled Tribes accounted for 6.21% and 0.01% of the population respectively. The average literacy of the town was 77.84%, compared to the national average of 72.99%. The town had a total of 21,411 households. There were a total of 32,556 workers, comprising 134 cultivators, 1,241 main agricultural labourers, 3,126 in house hold industries, 25,769 other workers, 2,286 marginal workers, 18 marginal cultivators, 318 marginal agricultural labourers, 119 marginal workers in household industries and 1,831 other marginal workers. The decadal growth of population during the 1991–2001 period reduced to half of the previous decade due to migration to industrialized cities.

As per the religious census of 2011, Srivilliputhur (M) had 90.7% Hindus, 2.27% Muslims, 6.62% Christians, 0.01% Sikhs, 0.01% Buddhists, 0.38% following other religions and 0.02% following no religion or did not indicate any religious preference.

As of 1994, a total 255.11 ha (630.4 acres) (45%) of the land in Srivilliputhur was used for residential, 17.89 ha (44.2 acres) (3%) for commercial, 15.04 ha (37.2 acres) (3%) for industrial, 30.808 ha (76.13 acres) (5%) for public & semi public, 12.677 ha (31.33 acres) (2%) for educational and 238.61 ha (589.6 acres) (24%) for non urban purposes like agriculture and irrigation.

== Economy ==
Hand loom weaving and farming are the primary occupations in Srivilliputhur. Virudhunagar district has four clusters of handloom weavers — Rajapalayam, Srivilliputhur, Aruppukottai and Sundarapandiyam. The looms account for 25% of the state handloom produce for free distribution. Srivilliputhur is known for a milk sweet called as Srivilliputhur Palkova. The Srivilliputhur Milk Producers Cooperative Society Ltd. and other local vendors started the production of the sweet from 1977 after the white revolution in the 1970s. The industry provides employment to the citizens of the town. Holy places like Srivilliputhur Andal Temple and Sri Vaidyanathar Temple located here draw thousands of pilgrims. The occupational pattern of the town is predominantly in tertiary sector that includes sub-sectors such as handloom weaving, trade and commerce, transport, storage and communication and related services. Primary and secondary sectors such as agriculture, livestock, manufacturing and construction reduced during the decade of 1991.

== Municipal administration and politics ==
Municipality officials
Chairman	ravi kannan
Commissioner	T.M.Mohammed Maideen
Vice Chairman	Selvamani
Elected members
Member of Legislative Assembly	E.M. Manraj
Member of Parliament	Dhanush M Kumar

The Srivilliputhur municipality was established in 1894 during British times. It was promoted to a first-grade municipality in 1984. The municipality has 33 wards and there is an elected councillor for each of those wards. The functions of the municipality are devolved into six departments: general administration/personnel, Engineering, Revenue, Public Health, city planning and Information Technology (IT). All these departments are under the control of a Municipal Commissioner who is the executive head. The legislative powers are vested in a body of 33 members, one each from the 33 wards. The legislative body is headed by an elected Chairperson assisted by a Deputy Chairperson. The municipality covers an area of 5.718 km^{2} (5,718,000 m^{2})

Srivilliputhur comes under the Srivilliputhur assembly constituency and it elects a member to the Tamil Nadu Legislative Assembly once every five years. From the 1977 elections, the assembly seat was won by Dravida Munnetra Kazhagam (DMK) once during 1989 elections, Communist Party of India (CPI) twice during 2006 and 2011, and All India Anna Dravid Munnetra Kazhagam (AIADMK) for five times during 1977, 1980, 1996 and 2001 elections. The current MLA of the constituency is V. Ponnupandi from CPI.

During the 1957 elections, Srivilliputhur was a part of Srivilliputhur constituency and was held by the Indian National Congress party and an independent. The town was a part of Virudhunagar Lok sabha constituency during the 1967 elections and was held by the Swathanthara Party. The constituency was held by DMK during the 1971 elections, INC during the 1977 elections and ADMK during the 1980, 1984, 1989 and 1991 elections, CPI during 1996 and MDMK during the 1998, 1999 and 2004 elections. Srivilliputhur is now part of the Tenkasi (Lok Sabha constituency) – it has the following six assembly constituencies – Sankaranayanarkoil (SC), Vasudevanallur (SC), Kadayanallur, Tenkasi, Srivilliputhur and Rajapalayam. The current Member of Parliament from the constituency is Dhanush M Kumar from the Dravida Munnetra Kazhagam.

Law and order in the town is maintained by the Srivilliputhur sub division of the Tamil Nadu Police headed by a Deputy Superintendent. There are three police stations in the town, one of them being an all-women police station. There are special units like prohibition enforcement, district crime, social justice and human rights, district crime records and special branch that operate at the district level police division headed by a Superintendent of Police.

Virudhunagar District court is in Srivilliputtur. This town receives drinking water supply from Thamirabarani river, an additional water resource.

== Education and utility services ==
There are 19 elementary, six middle, one high, one matriculation and six matriculation schools in Srivilliputhur. There are no colleges in the town. Electricity supply to Srivilliputhur is regulated and distributed by the Tamil Nadu Electricity Board (TNEB). The town along with its suburbs forms the Srivilliputhur Electricity Distribution Circle. A Chief Distribution engineer is stationed at the regional headquarters. Water supply is provided by the Srivilliputhur Municipality from two sources, namely Peyanar river and deep bore wells. During the period 2000–01, a total of 3.125 million litres of water was supplied every day for households in the town. The present water supply scheme from Peyanar and catchment area were implemented in 1955 and 1984 respectively. The water supply by the municipality has a coverage of 50%.

About 24 metric tonnes of solid waste are collected from Srivilliputhur every day by door-to-door collection and subsequently the source segregation and dumping is carried out by the sanitary department of the Srivilliputhur municipality. The coverage of solid waste management had an efficiency of 100% as of 2001. There is no underground drainage system in the town and the sewerage system for disposal of sullage is through septic tanks, open drains and public conveniences. The municipality maintains storm water drains along 92.4 kilometres (57.4 mi) of surfaced roads and 8.7 kilometres (5.4 mi) along unlined roads. A total of 12.05 kilometres (7.49 mi) of roads in town have no drainage.

There are one maternity hospital, one government health centre and various private clinics in the town that take care of the health care needs of the citizens. There are a total of 2,072 street lamps: 222 sodium lamps, one mercury vapour lamps, 1,748 tube lights and one high mast beam lamp in the town. Uzhavar Santhai, operated by the municipality and Pennington Market, operated by a private committee are the two markets located in the centre of the town that cater to the needs of the town and the rural areas around it.

== Transportation ==
The Srivilliputhur municipality maintains a total of 54.576 km (33.912 mi) of roads. The town has 15.63 km (9.71 mi) concrete roads, 38.526 km (23.939 mi) bituminous roads and 0.4 km (0.25 mi) earthen roads. The national highway NH 208 that connects Madurai and Kollam passes through the town and connects surrounding urban centers like Rajapalayam and Tenkasi.

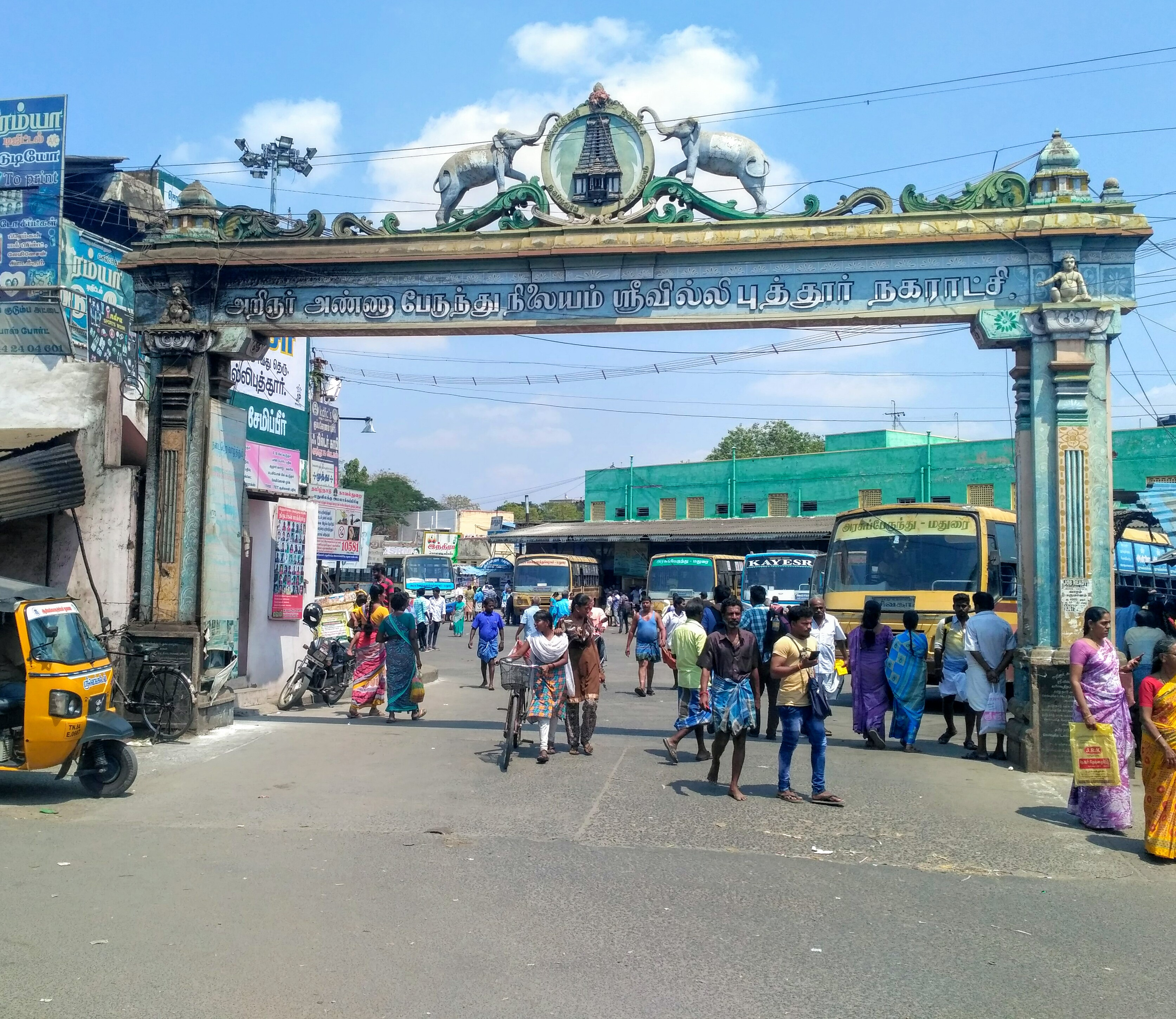
Srivilliputhur bus station

Srivilliputhur is served by town bus service, which provides connectivity within the town and the suburbs. There are private operated mini-bus services that cater to the local transport needs of the town. The main bus stand covers an area of 2,830 m^{2} (0.70 acres) and is located in the heart of the town. There are regular inter-city bus services to the town. The Tamil Nadu State Transport Corporation operates daily services connecting various cities to Srivilliputhur. The State Express Transport Corporation operates long-distance buses connecting the town to important cities like Chennai and Madurai. The major inter city bus routes from the town are to cities like Madurai, Chennai, Erode, Coimbatore, Theni, Karaikudi, Dindigul, Trichy, Karur, Ramnad, Tanjore, Sankarankovil, Sengottai, Rajapalayam, Tenkasi, Kovilpatti, Tuticorin, Tiruchendur, Nagercoil and Tirunelveli. The town bus routes to surrounding villages are to Mamsapuram, Krishnankoil, Sundarapandiam, Watrap, Koomapatti, Maharajapuram, Koonampatti, Vanniampatti junction, Thalavaipuram, Natchiyarpatti and Chathirapatti.

Srivilliputtur railway station

Srivilliputtur railway station is located in the rail head from Madurai to Tenkasi and Sengottai. It connects Tamil Nadu with Kerala through Rajapalayam and Sengottai. The Podhigai Express and Kollam express connects Srivilliputhur to Sengottai, kollam and Chennai Egmore in either directions. All other express trains ply from Virudunagar station. There are also passenger trains running either side from Madurai to Tenkasi. The nearest local and international airport is Madurai International Airport, located 74 km (46 mi) away from the town.

== Culture ==
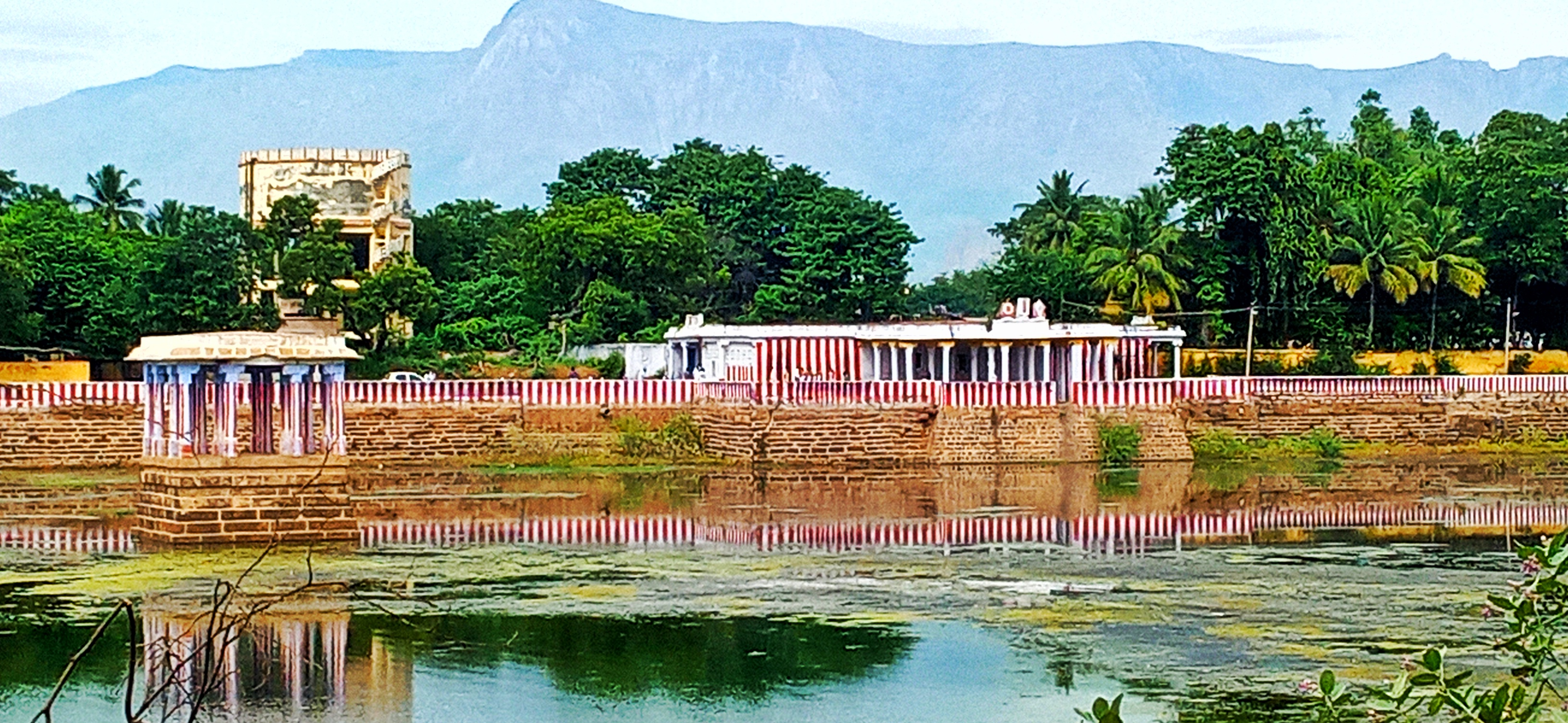

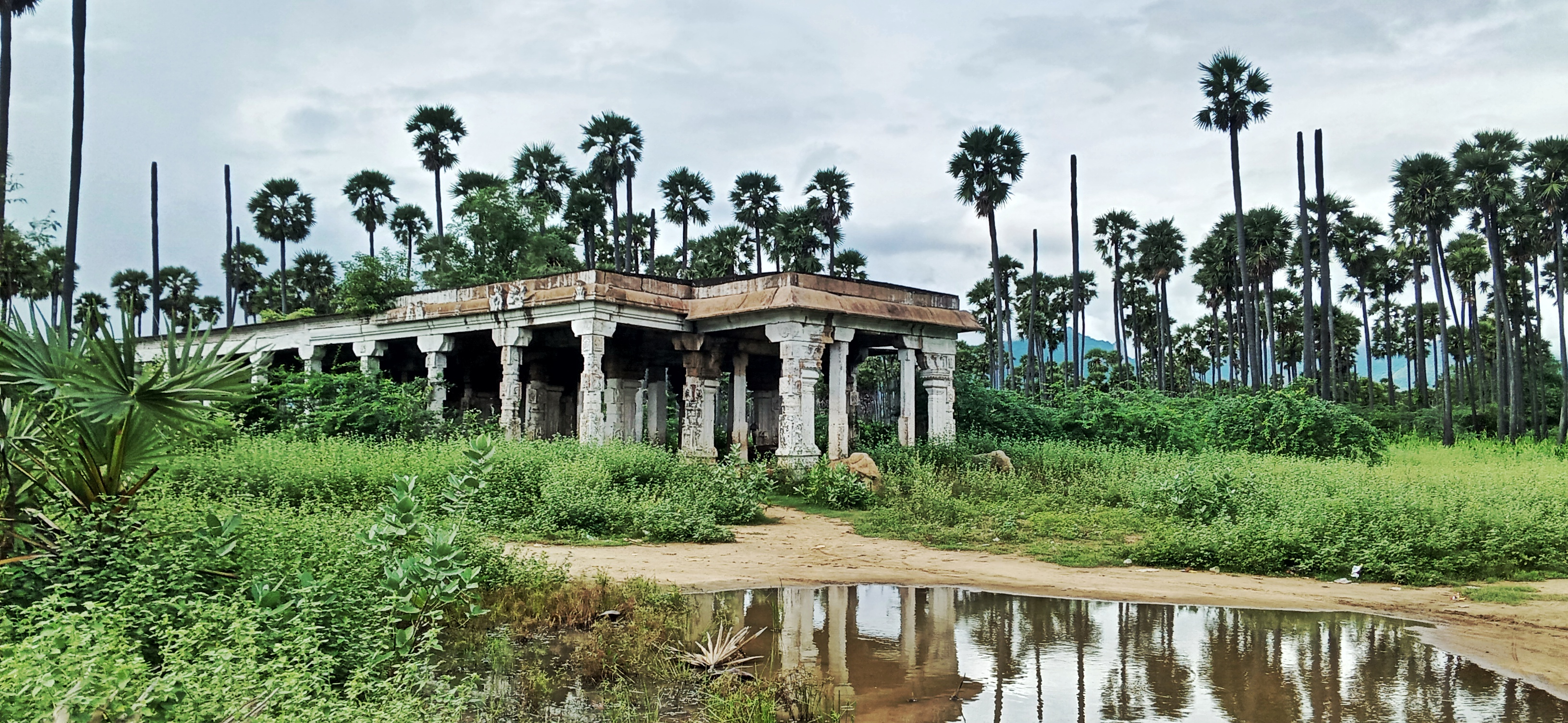

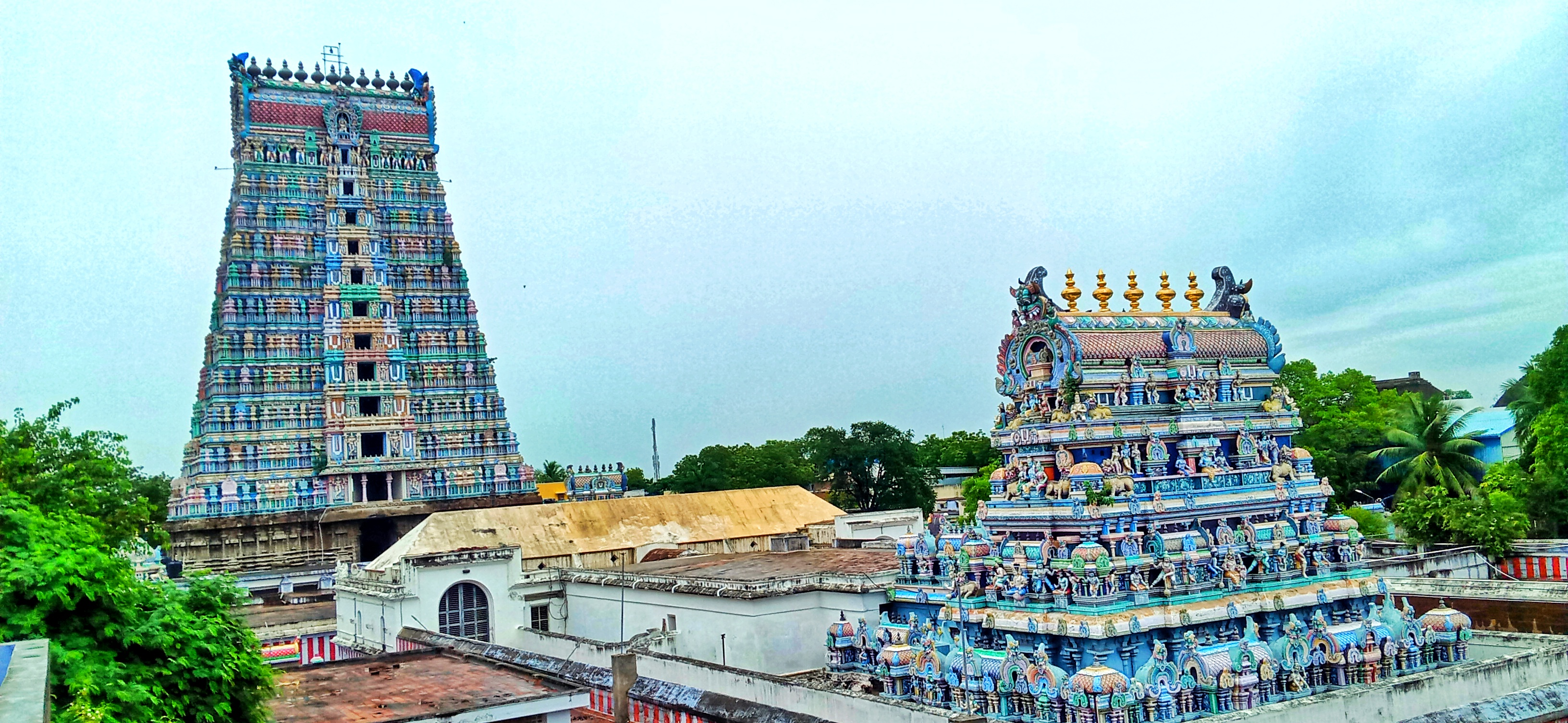
Srivilliputhur Divya Desam temple

Srivilliputhur Andal Temple is a popular landmark of Srivilliputhur. It is a Hindu temple dedicated to Vishnu and one of the 108 Divya Desams, temples that are revered in the Nalayira Divya Prabandham, the 8th-10th century Vaishnava canonical literature. It is the birthplace of two of the most important Alvar saints in the Vaishnavite tradition, Periyalvar, and Andal.

Vatapatrasayi temple is a temple dedicated to Vishnu in the form of Vatapatrasayi (Lord of the Banyan Leaf) or Rangamannar. In iconographic representations the deity is shown as a young child, resting on a banyan tree leaf known as Vatapatram, floating on water.

Madavar Vilagam Vaidyanathar temple, enshrining a six-foot high monolithic image of Nataraja, is another prominent temple in the town.

Thiruvannamalai, also known as Thenthirupathi, is a temple dedicated to Vishnu and is located 5 km (3.1 mi) away from Srivilliputhur, surrounded by western Ghats.

Kattalagar Koil is another Vishnu temple located 9 km (5.6 mi), west of Srivilliputhur over the Mantuga Hills.

Sathuragiri Hills is home of two temples, namely Sundra Mahalingam temple and Sandhana Mahalingam temple. The place known for rare medicinal plants and the medicinal value of 275 plants has been recorded and reported. The forest also has a rich variety of orchids and ferns.

Pennington Public Library, established in 1875, is one of the oldest privately run public libraries in India. Pilavakkal is a dam in Watrap village and is one of the picnic spots of Srivilliputhur.

Thousands of people from the state participate in the "Adi Pooram" festival celebrated in the Andal Temple. After early morning special pujas, the presiding deities, Sri Rengamannar and Goddess Andal are taken in decorated palanquins to the car. The festival marks the adoption of presiding deity, Andal, by Periyazhwar after he found her near a tulasi plant in the garden of Vadabadrasai Temple at Srivilliputhur on the eighth day of the Tamil month of Adi. Very cultural classical local festival named mulaipari is famous in four streets Perumalpatti, Arrachipatti, Kamapatti and Mangapuram.

Sarva Bhauma Aiyangar, who is popularly called Villiputhurar, lived in the city presumably during the period of Nayaks in the 17th century. He translated the Mahabaratha, one of the two epics to Tamil.

== See also ==
- Srivilliputhur Wildlife Sanctuary
