= Watrap =

Vathirairuppu Vathirayiruppu
- Town panchayat
- Location in Tamil Nadu, India Vathirairuppu (India)
- Coordinates: 9°38′7″N 77°38′20″E
- Country: India
- State: Tamil Nadu
- District: Virudhunagar

Government
  - Body: Taluk
- Elevation: 73 m (240 ft)

Population (01-Jan-2001)
  - Total: 15,999

Languages
  - Official: Tamil
- Time zone: UTC+5:30 (IST)
- PIN: 626 132
- Telephone code: 04563
- Vehicle registration: TN-67, TN-84
- Nearest city: Madurai
- Lok Sabha constituency: Tenkasi
- Vidhan Sabha constituency: Srivilliputtur
- Civic agency: Town Panchayat
- Climate: Apr-May - Min 20 Deg C Max 42 Deg C and May - Mar - Min 20 Deg C Max 30 deg C (Köppen)

Vathirairuppu is a taluk in Virudhunagar District, in the Indian state of Tamil Nadu.

== History ==
Vathirairuppu's traditional name before the British came was Vatratha Iruppu, which translates as "surplus water".

== Culture ==
A Perumal temple (Pěrumāḷ Kōyil, பெருமாள் கோயில்) sits in the centre of the village and a Shiva and Hanuman temple is at the outskirts of the village.

The holy uphill shrine "Sundara Mahalingam (Lord Shiva) temple" (also known as Thaani Paarai and Sathuragiri Malai) is there. Aadi Amavasai (New Moon Day in the month of Aadi) is when devotees throng here.

A Krishna, Rukmini and Sathyabama temple called Gopala Swamy Malai tops a small hill, 22 km from Vathirairuppu. A Shiva Cave temple called Motta Malai is 16 km from Vathirairuppu.

== Economy ==
Agriculture is the primary livelihood. The main work is cultivatioagriculture, led by paddy, coconut and cotton.

Branches of State Bank of India, Union Bank of India, Virudhunagar District Cooperative Bank and Rural Cooperative Bank are there.

== Education ==
Three government-aided schools and two private schools operate there.

== Geography ==
The town sits on the bank of the Arjuna River. Dams Pilavakal (பிளவக்கல் அணை) and Kovilaaru provide irrigation.

Sathuragiri Hills contains dense tropical greenery, undisturbed forests and wildlife. Natural caves, some 2 km away from Sathuragiri temple and a fresh water pond at the top of the hill attract visitors. Perrumal Mottai is the highest and coldest spot in these hills.

Natural spring Maavuthu (big spring) us 8 km from Vathirairuppu. It is situated at the foot of the western Ghats.
