= Virudhunagar district =

District of Tamil Nadu, India

- District
- Nickname: Virudhai
- Virudhunagar district Location in Tamil Nadu
- Coordinates: 9.6°N 78°E
- Country: India
- State: Tamil Nadu
- Taluks: 10
- Panchayat Unions (Blocks): 11
- Corporation: 1
- Municipalities: 5
- Established: 15 March 1985
- Administrative headquarters: Virudhunagar
- Talukas: Aruppukkottai, Kariapatti, Rajapalayam, Sattur, Sivakasi, Srivilliputhur, Tiruchuli, Vembakottai, Virudhunagar, Watrap

Government
  - Collector: Dr N.O.Sukhaputra IAS
  - Superintendent of Police: Thiru. Srinivasa Perumal, M.A., M.B.A, IPS

Area
  - Total: 4,288 km^{2} (1,656 sq mi)
  - Rank: 13
- Highest elevation: 187 m (614 ft)
- Lowest elevation: 69 m (226 ft)

Population (2011)
  - Total: 1,942,288
  - Rank: 15 (Tamilnadu)
  - Density: 453.0/km^{2} (1,173/sq mi)

Languages
  - Official: Tamil
- Time zone: UTC+5:30 (IST)
- PIN: 626xxx
- Telephone code: 04562
- ISO 3166 code: [[ISO 3166-2:IN|]]
- Vehicle registration: TN 67(Virudhunagar), TN 84(Srivilliputtur) TN 67W(Aruppukottai), TN 95(Sivakasi)
- Central location: 9°35′N 77°57′E
- Website: virudhunagar.nic.in

Virudhunagar district is a district (an administrative district) of Tamil Nadu state in south India. Virudhunagar is the district headquarters of Virudhunagar district. Virudhunagar district was formed by the separation of Old Ramanathapuram District G.O passed on 08, March 1985 & formed in 15, March 1985 into Ramanathapuram District, Sivagangai District and the west part as Virudhunagar District. Virudhunagar District was formerly called Karmavirer Kamarajar District. As of 2011, Virudhunagar district had a population of 1,942,288 with a sex-ratio of 1,007 females for every 1,000 males. Rajapalayam is the most populous and largest town in the district.

== Demographics ==
Historical population
Year	Pop.	±% p.a.
1901	584,278	—
1911	654,862	+1.15%
1921	691,149	+0.54%
1931	739,064	+0.67%
1941	768,137	+0.39%
1951	859,840	+1.13%
1961	972,288	+1.24%
1971	1,151,449	+1.71%
1981	1,340,907	+1.53%
1991	1,565,037	+1.56%
2001	1,751,301	+1.13%
2011	1,942,288	+1.04%

Religions in Virudhunagar district (2011)
Religion	Percent
Hinduism	93.84%
Christianity	3.47%
Islam	2.46%
Other or not stated	0.23%

According to 2011 census, Virudhunagar district had a population of 1,942,288, up from 1,751,301 in 2001, or about an 11% increase. The sex-ratio was 1,007 females for every 1,000 males, much above the national average of 929, but down from 1,012 in 2001. A total of 197,134 were under the age of six, constituting 100,827 males and 96,307 females. Scheduled Castes and Scheduled Tribes accounted for 20.59% and 0.12% of the population, respectively. The average literacy of the district was 72.02%, compared to the national average of 72.99%. The district had a total of 537,748 households. There were a total of 950,158 workers, comprising 52,361 cultivators, 168,174 main agricultural labourers, 30,292 in house hold industries, 603,239 other workers, 96,092 marginal workers, 4,792 marginal cultivators, 40,528 marginal agricultural labourers, 5,006 marginal workers in household industries and 45,766 other marginal workers.

Languages of Virudhunagar district (2011)
1. Tamil (89.5%)
2. Telugu (8.87%)
3. Kannada (1.35%)
4. Others (0.27%)

At the time of the 2011 census, 89.51% of the population spoke Tamil, 8.87% Telugu and 1.35% Kannada as their first language.

== Location ==
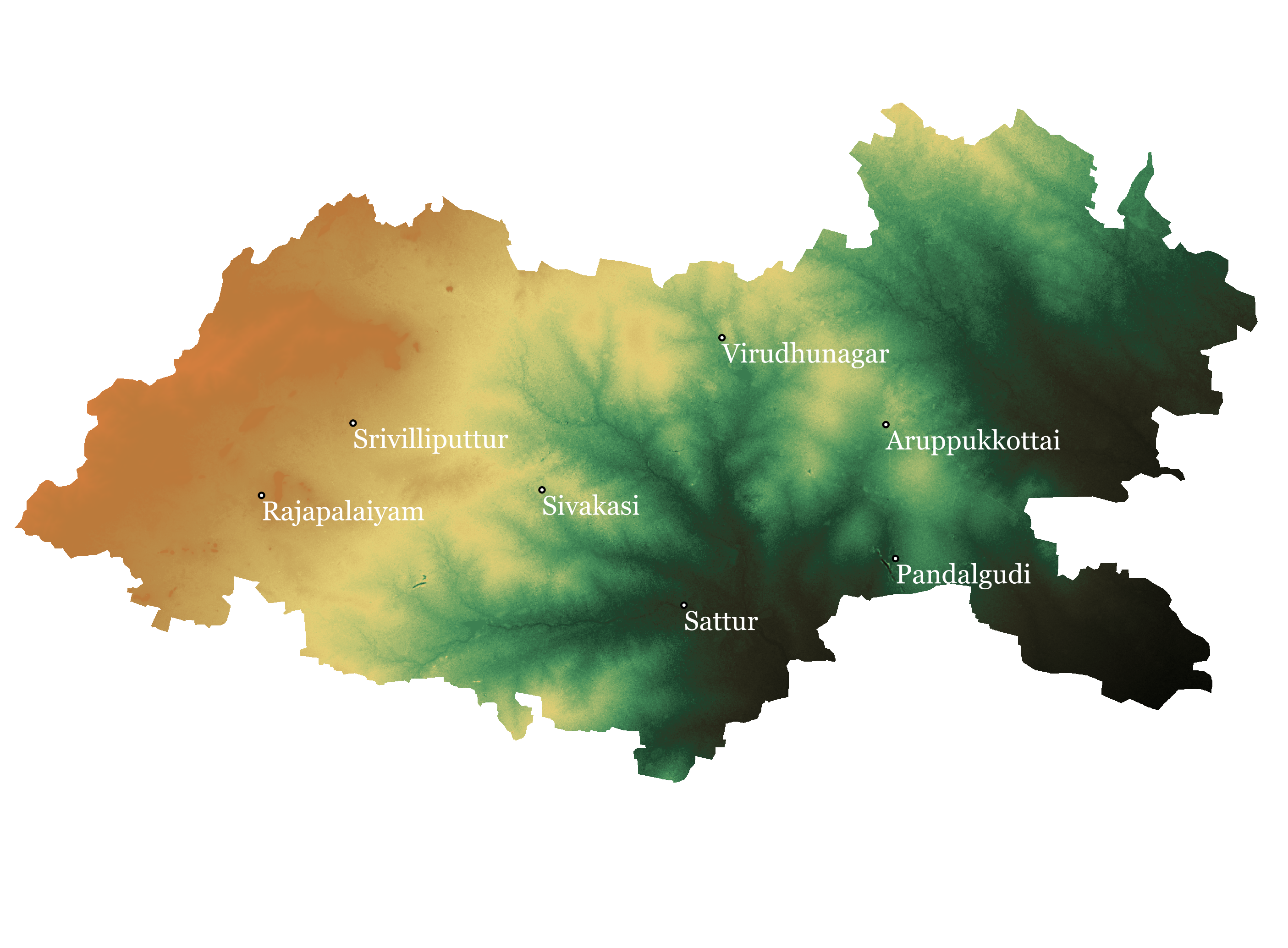
River Basins in Virudhunagar district. Dark green shaded region shows the drainage basins.

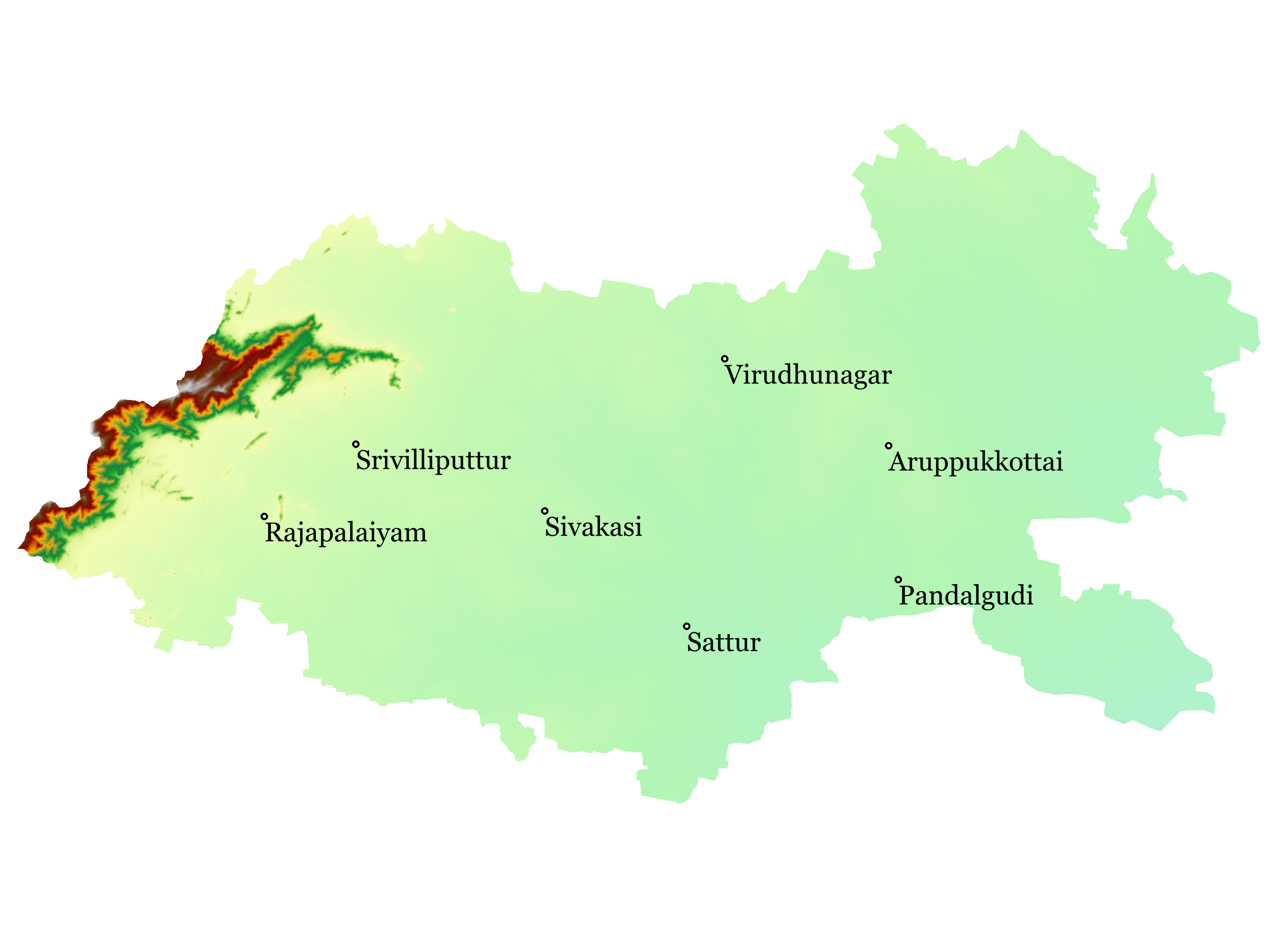
Relief map of Virudhunagar district. Western Ghats appear left hand side as brightly shaded region.

The district is bounded by Sivagangai district and Madurai district on the north, Tenkasi district and Tuticorin District to the south and Ramanathapuram District on east Theni district to the northwest and Idukki district of Kerala to the west.

== Politics ==
District	No.	Constituency	Name	Party	Alliance	Remarks
Virudhunagar	202	Rajapalayam	K. Jegadeshwari	TVK	TVK+	Cabinet Minister
Virudhunagar	203	Srivilliputhur (SC)	A. Karthik	TVK	TVK+	
Virudhunagar	204	Sattur	A. Kadarkarairaj	DMK	SPA	
Virudhunagar	205	Sivakasi	S. Keerthana	TVK	TVK+	Cabinet Minister
Virudhunagar	206	Virudhunagar	P. Selvam	TVK	TVK+	
Virudhunagar	207	Aruppukkottai	K. K. S. S. R. Ramachandran	DMK	SPA	
Virudhunagar	208	Tiruchuli	Thangam Thenarasu	DMK	SPA	

== Administration ==
The district is divided into three revenue divisions - Sivakasi, Sattur and Aruppukottai.

The district comprises ten taluks: Aruppukkottai, Kariapatti, Rajapalayam, Sattur, Sivakasi, Srivilliputhur, Tiruchuli, Vembakottai, Virudhunagar and Watrap. In total there are 600 revenue villages in this district.

This district has nine town panchayats – Seithur, Vathirairuppu, Chettiarpatti, Kariapatti, Mamsapuram, Sundarapandiam, Mallankinaru, S.Kodikulam and W.Pudupatti.

The Parliamentary Constituency number of Virudhunagar District is 34.

== Economy ==
Virudhunagar district is one of India's leading in the match industry, fireworks and printing, mostly concentrated in and around Sivakasi. Virudhunagar is the main market for oil, chicory, coffee seeds, dry chillies and pulses. There are two trade centres (Godowns) in the District one in Virudhunagar and another in Rajapalayam. Ginning factories, spinning mills, power loom and hand loom industries are also present in the district at Rajapalayam the second big weaving town in the state after Coimbatore. One of the cement plants of Ramco Cements Ltd is located in RR Nagar near Viudhunagar another one located at Alankulam of Sivakasi Taluk. In 2018, Government of India classifies Virudhunagar as one of the 112 most underdeveloped district across the country and brought it under Aspirational Districts Programme Phase 1.

== See also ==
- Villages in Virudhunagar district
- Kallamanaickerpatti
- List of districts of Tamil Nadu
