= Avadi =

City in Tiruvallur district, Tamil Nadu, India

- City
- Nickname: Chennai's Western Gateway
- Avadi Avadi (Tamil Nadu)
- Coordinates: 13°06′35″N 80°05′50″E
- Country: India
- State: Tamil Nadu
- District: Tiruvallur
- Metro: CMA

Government
  - Type: Municipal Corporation
  - Body: Avadi Municipal Corporation
  - Mayor: G. Udayakumar (DMK)

Area
  - Total: 65 km^{2} (25 sq mi)
- Elevation: 26.85 m (88.1 ft)

Population (2011)
  - Total: 695,000
  - Density: 11,000/km^{2} (28,000/sq mi)

Other details
  - Official language: Tamil
- Time zone: UTC+5:30 (IST)
- Postal codes: "600054, 600055, 600062, 600065, 600071, 600072, 602024"
- Vehicle registration: TN 12(Poonamallee)
- Parliamentary constituency: Tiruvallur
- MP: Sasikanth Senthil, INC
- MLA: R. Ramesh Kumar, TVK
- Assembly constituency: Avadi
- Planning agency: CMDA

Avadi (Tamil: [aːʋaɖi]) is a City in Chennai metropolitan area, Thiruvallur district, Tamil Nadu, India. Its the headquarters of Avadi City Police, Avadi City Corporation and Avadi Taluk located within the Thiruvallur district of Tamil Nadu, India. Situated at about 22 kilometres (14 mi) from Chennai Central Railway Station and 24 kilometres (15 mi) from It's district headquarters Tiruvallur and 58 kilometres (36 mi) from Another Railway Junction Arrakonam. Avadi is surrounded by major defence establishments and is home to various universities and engineering colleges. The neighborhood is served by Avadi Railway Station of the Chennai Suburban Railway and just 7 km from the upcoming Karayanchavadi Metro of Chennai Metro Rail . As of 2011, Avadi had a population of 345,996, which is 10th most populous place in Tamil Nadu. It is home to the Heavy Vehicles Factory (HVF), Ordnance Factory Board (ODF) which houses Engine Factory and Combat Vehicles Research and Development Establishment (CVRDE). The lake in Avadi was known as Paaleripattu, which is now found only in very old land documents.

== Etymology ==
The exact origin of the name 'Avadi' is not known. One version has it that it is the combination of "Aa" (meaning cow) and "Adi or gudi (kudi)" (meaning place in Tamil), indicating that the place had many cows. One of the more popular theories about the origin of the name is that it is an acronym for "Armoured Vehicles and Ammunition Depot of India". However, this is most likely a backronym invented more recently. The entity "Armoured Vehicles and Ammunition Depot of India" does not appear in any British records. This acronym is further disputed by the existence of a railway station going by the name of "Avadi" in the locality since 1873 before the establishment of defence industries.

Several British documents from the 19th century refer to the place as "Avady", which doesn't match the widely circulated acronym theory. The name Avadi (Avady) was already in use by 1856, when the first public railway was opened in the Madras Presidency. This predates the transfer of the Madras Presidency's arsenal from Fort St. George, India in the city of Madras, to Avadi, which was done sometime after 1870, which contradicts the popular acronym theory.

== History ==
The suburb is part of the "auto belt" that developed when the automobile industry developed in Madras, primarily in the city's industrial north and west regions, in the early post-World War II years.

The famous session of the Indian National Congress was held at Avadi on 10 January 1955 where the Avadi Resolution was declared that the objective of the Congress was the establishment of a "socialistic pattern of society" in India. This historical meet emphasised the importance of socialism and its impact on social development. Jawaharlal Nehru with Morarji Desai and other Congress leaders at the AICC session declared that a socialistic pattern of society was the goal of the Congress.

== Geography ==
Avadi is located at 13.12°N 80.1°E. It covers an area of 65 square kilometres (25 sq mi) and has an average elevation of 17 metres (56 ft). Avadi is one of the largest localities in Thiruvallur district, stretching from Poonamalle High Road to MTH Road.

=== Lake ===
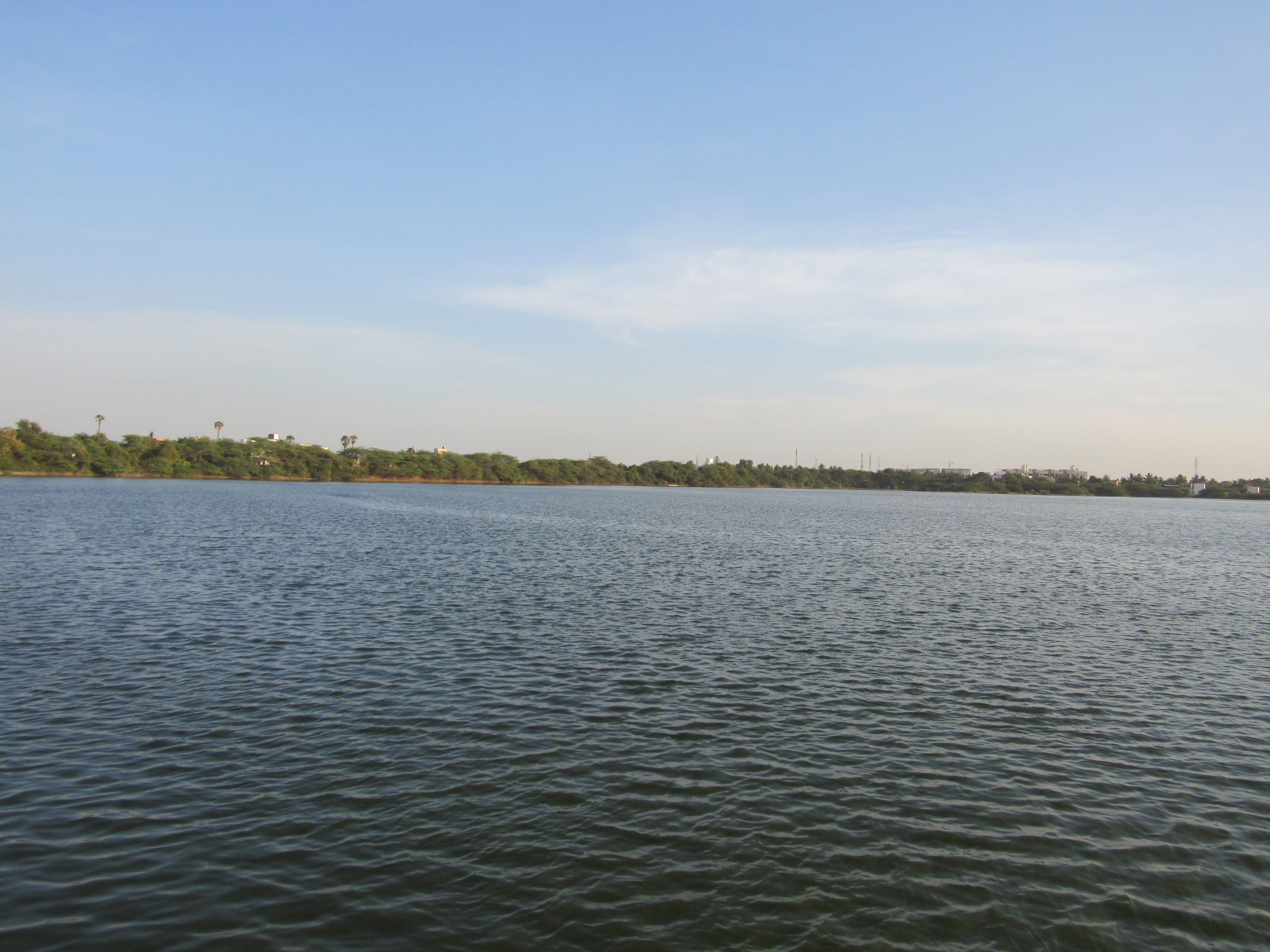
A view of the Avadi lake before renovation

Avadi has a lake called Paruthipattu Lake. Spread over 200 acres and 2.64 kilometres (1.64 mi) in length, the lake is located behind the Tamil Nadu Housing Board (TNHB) and Thirumullaivoyal. It was once a source of water for farmland irrigation. The body of water attracts many birds throughout the year. However, in the recent decades it has lost most of its area to indiscriminate building and encroachment. The Paruthippattu Lake area was renovated with a budget of 32 crores and converted into an eco-park that officially opened on 19 June 2019. The renovation added recreational facilities, a 3-km-long walking track, a central plaza and various greenery, while addressing the issues of encroachment and sewage pollution that had affected the once-neglected lake.

== Waste management ==
The neighborhood generates about 150 metric tonnes of garbage daily. Together with Thiruninravur and Poonamallee, Avadi generates about 210 metric tonnes of solid waste from around 120,000 households, which is dumped on a 17.78-acre site in Sekkadu, owned by the Avadi Municipal Corporation. In 2017, the municipal corporation planned to construct 33 decentralized compost processing plants at a cost of ₹ 109.6 million, each with a capacity to convert 4 tonnes of biodegradable waste into manure. Of these, 17 plants were operational as of February 2018.

== IT Parks and Companies ==
=== IT Park ===
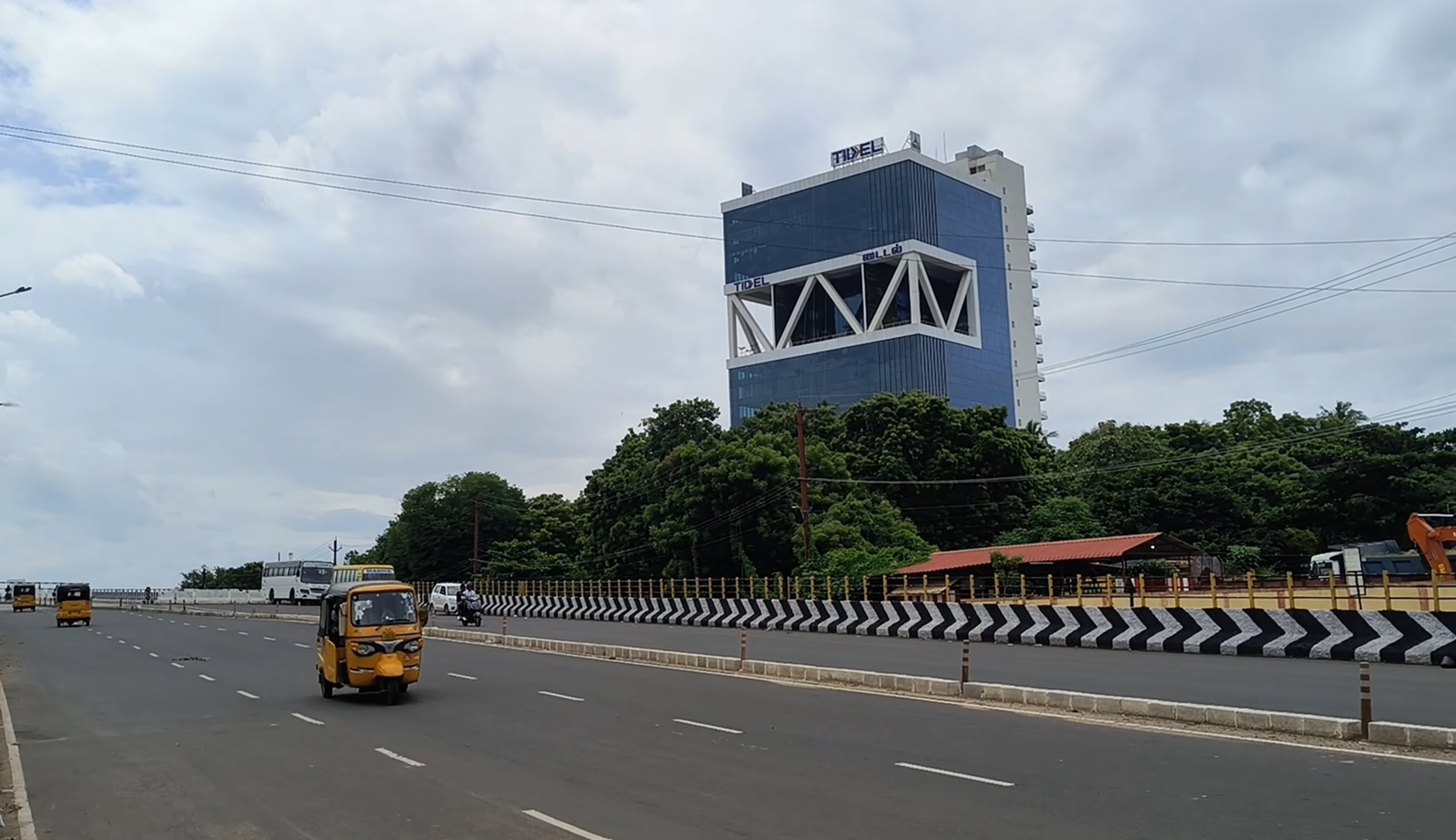
Tidel Park, Pattabiram from CTH Road

A new Tidel Park, with a built-up area of 5,57,000 square feet, will be built on a 10-acre land at a cost of ₹ 2,300 million at Avadi–Pattabiram on MTH Road. This is expected to provide jobs for 30,000 people. The Construction work started in August 2020. Dell Technology and Tata Consultancy Service (TCS) have shown interest to move to Avadi. iDEX a Central Government IT Company for Defence export is expected to invest 1000 crores in Tidel Park Avadi - Pattabiram.

In addition to military establishments, Avadi also houses a number of IT/ITES and other service sector-based firms.

=== Defence Industrial Corridor ===
Avadi is the major and biggest defence industrial corridor stands out first in the defence exports of the state which headquarters many defence industries for numerous defence manufacturing public undertakings such as Heavy Vehicles Factory, Armoured Vehicles Nigam, Engine Factory Avadi, Combat Vehicles Research and Development Establishment, DRDO and Ordnance Depot.

The major defence establishments with divisions in Avadi are the Indian Air Force, Indian Army, Heavy Vehicles Factory (HVF), EFA-Engine Factory, Combat Vehicles Research and Development Establishment (CVRDE), Central Reserve Police Force (CRPF), Indian Navy, Central Vehicle Depot (CVD), The Ordnance Depot (OD), Unfit Vehicles Park (UVP) and the Ordnance Clothing Factory (OCF).

The Indian Air Force has a Mechanical Transport Training Institute Technical (MTTI) here for training its personnel on driving and repairing vehicles, and also a base repair depot for repair and maintenance of its various equipment. CVRDE undertakes major research on battle tanks and other combat vehicles. MBT Arjuns, armoured ambulances, Combat Improved Ajeyas and Nag anti-tank missiles are some of the recent products from CVRDE. The Heavy Vehicles Factory produces an indigenous version of the T-72 tank known as Ajeya. HVF also produces the main battle tank Arjun. The production of T-90S Bhishma tanks started in 2006–2007. The Tamil Nadu Special Police (TSP) also has a division in Avadi, the TN 2nd and 5th Battalion.

There was a World War II airfield at Red Hills, Sholavaram, approachable from the junction close to the CRPF Camp, Avadi, immediately after the Military Hospital.

=== Manufacturing Industrial Hub ===
Avadi is around 7 km from Ambattur Industrial Estate and 22 km from Sriperambudur - Irungattukottai Sipcot Industrial Park.

== Demographics ==
Religious census - 2011
| Religion | Percent(%) |
| Hindu | 84.23% |
| Christian | 10.69% |
| Muslim | 4.56% |
| Jain | 0.08% |
| Sikh | 0.07% |
| Buddhist | 0.03% |
| Other | 0.3% |
| No religion | 0.03% |

Historical population
| Year | Pop. | ±% |
|---|---|---|
| 1951 | 5,979 | — |
| 1961 | 13,050 | +118.3% |
| 1971 | 77,413 | +493.2% |
| 1981 | 124,701 | +61.1% |
| 1991 | 183,215 | +46.9% |
| 2001 | 230,913 | +26.0% |
| 2011 | 345,996 | +49.8% |

According to the 2011 census, Avadi had a population of 345,996 with a sex-ratio of 970 females for every 1,000 males, well above the national average of 929. A total of 36,091 were under the age of six, constituting 18,419 males and 17,672 females. Scheduled Castes and Scheduled Tribes accounted for 16.16% and 0.63% of the population respectively. The average literacy of the city was 81.76%, compared to the national average of 72.99%. The city had a total of 87,733 households. There were a total of 127,152 workers, comprising 787 cultivators, 1,095 main agricultural labourers, 1,444 in household industries, 111,013 other workers, 12,813 marginal workers, 221 marginal cultivators, 310 marginal agricultural labourers, 449 marginal workers in household industries and 11,833 other marginal workers. As per the religious census of 2011, Avadi had 84.23% Hindus, 4.56% Muslims, 10.69% Christians, 0.07% Sikhs, 0.03% Buddhists, 0.08% Jains, 0.3% following other religions and 0.03% following no religion or did not indicate any religious preference.

From 229,403 in 2001, the population of Avadi grew to 344,701 in 2011, registering a decadal population growth of 50%.

=== Places of worship ===
There are many Hindu temples in and around Avadi. Karumari Amman temple, Chinnamman temple, Nagavalli Amman and Perumal temple are famous temples in Avadi. Many old generation temples are also present in and around Avadi. Thirumullaivoyal, a locality near Avadi, is famous for Masilamaniswara Temple, Thirumullaivoyal, an ancient temple of Lord Shiva, as well as Pachaiamman Temple. Vaikundhanaadhar Temple is located near Kovilpathagai; Angaalamman Temple is located on the Redhills road. Sri Venkateswara Perumal Temple in Kamaraj Nagar is a Vaishnavite shrine in Avadi. There is also a Sai baba temple located in morai, Avadi.

A handful of mosques serve a considerable Islamic population in Avadi. There are some churches over 50 years old, including Marthoma Church in Gandhi Nagar, CSI, RC and Orthodox Churches in HVF road. Also, numerous churches have been built in recent years; St Antony's Shrine is a Catholic church located at Avadi Check-post. There is a Jain temple, Vasupujiya Jain Temple, and a Gurudwara in the HVF estate for the Sikhs to worship in Avadi.

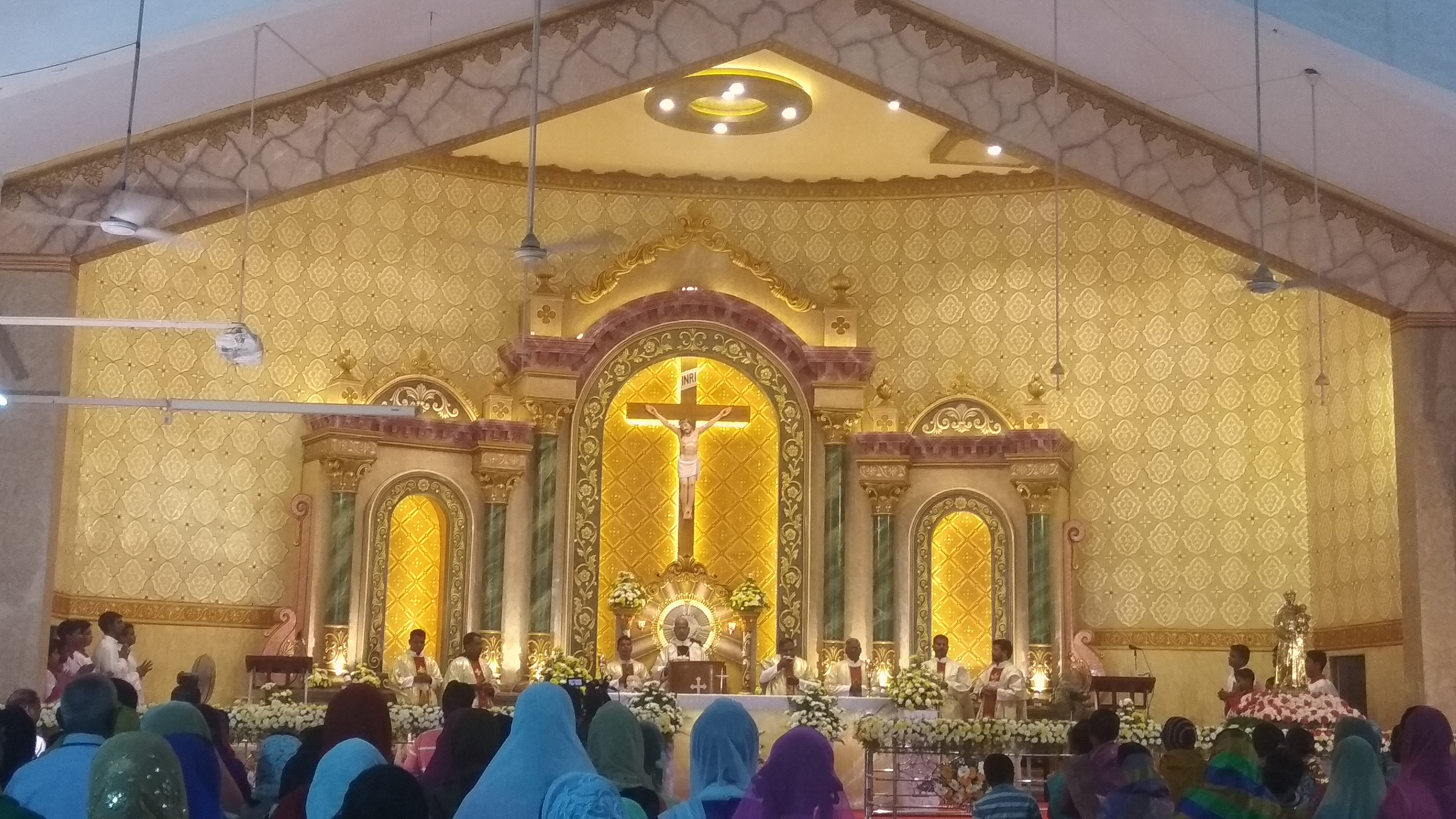
St.Anthony Church Avadi, alter

Avadi has a considerable range of religious communities and traditions, since it contains places of worship associated with different faiths and has a history of religious coexistence.

== Transport ==
=== Railways ===
Avadi railway station is one of the important suburban terminal stations of the Chennai Suburban Railway Network. It lies on the Chennai Jolarpettai Mainline. Few express trains like Thiruvananthapuram Chennai Mail, Alappuzha Chennai Express, Chennai- Mangalore superfast express and Tirupati Chennai Garudadri stops at Avadi. The proximity of the MTC bus terminus to the railway station has led many commuters to choose Avadi as a transit point. Avadi railway station has the seventh highest footfall in Southern Railways with numbers exceeding 75,000 per day.

==== Suburban services ====
Avadi is connected very well with rest of the city by EMU trains. There are frequent suburban trains from Avadi to Chennai Central, Chennai Beach, Arakonam, Thiruvallur, Tiruthani and Velachery. By rail, Avadi is 45 minutes from Chennai Central, 24 minutes from Perambur and 15 minutes from Villivakkam. Some trains originate from here as Avadi has an EMU Shed, which handles the majority of the suburban train operations on the Northern and Western line. The Western line has 229 services a day and the North line has 83, which accounts 312 trains.

=== Roadways ===
==== Chennai–Tiruttani highway extension ====
The Tamil Nadu Highways department issued a GO on 4 October 2013 to extending the entire Chennai – Tiruttani highway to 6 lanes at a cost of ₹1.68 billion. The first phase will involve extending the road to 4 lanes – 100 ft with center median and encroachments have already started to be removed. The road junction at Avadi Checkpost connects Avadi Poonamallee road with the CTH road. The Chennai Outer ring road (ORR) passes through western part of Avadi.

==== Avadi Bus Terminus ====
Avadi bus terminus is located very near to the Avadi railway station on the Chennai - Thiruvallur High Road (CTH road). The depot is situated beside the bus terminal. Avadi is well connected to various locations of Chennai as well as rural areas surrounding North-western and Western Chennai. The main service provider though is the state-owned Metropolitan Transport Corporation buses, TNSTC/SETC buses to Tirupati, Nellore, Bangalore, Sengottai, Tirunelveli, Tuticorin operates from here & few private buses are also available.

==== Share Autos ====
Share Autos are one of the popular modes of transport there. Share Autos are mostly spotted near Avadi bus terminal and Checkpost junction. They usually ply between Poonamallee, Karayanchavadi, Pattabiram, Thiruninravur, Anna Nagar, Nungambakkam and Koyambedu.

=== Metro ===
The branch line of Line 5 (Chennai Metro) is planned along Avadi-Koyambedu stretch with DPR approved by Government of Tamilnadu in May 2025 and awaiting approval from Government of India, with land surveys currently in progress. As of 2025, Karayanchavadi metro station of Yellow Line is the nearest to Avadi.

== Educational institutions ==
=== Schools ===
- The Nazareth Academy (CBSE)
- Nazareth Matriculation Higher Secondary School
- Nazareth Primary School
- Kendra Vidyalaya School
- HVF School
- Vijayanta School
- Holy Immanuel Matriculation School
- Air Force School, Avadi
- Jaigopal garodia vivekananda vidyalaya higher secondary school

=== Colleges ===
- S.A Engineering College
- Murugappa Polytechnic College
- Veltech Rangarajan Sangunthala Arts College
- Nazareth College of Arts and Science
- St'peter's Engineering College

== State assembly constituency ==
Avadi is a state assembly constituency in Tamil Nadu, India, formed after constituency delimitation.^{[1]} The areas included are Poonamalle Taluk (partially), Pattabiram, Thirunindravur, Tiruverkadu and Avadi (M). It is included in the Thiruvallur parliamentary constituency.

| Year | Winner | Party |
|---|---|---|
| 2011 | S. Abdul Rahim | Anna Dravida Munnetra Kazhagam |
| 2016 | K. Pandiarajan | Anna Dravida Munnetra Kazhagam |
| 2021 | S. M. Nasar | Dravida Munnetra Kazhagam |
| 2026 | R.RAMESH KUMAR | Tamilaga Vettri Kazhagam |
