= Ma Foi Strategic Consultants =

- Type: Private
- Industry: Management consulting
- Founded: 2012 (as Ma Foi Strategic Consultants); 1992 (as Ma Foi Management Consultants)
- Headquarters: Chennai, India
- Area served: International
- Key people: K. Pandiarajan
- Website: www.mafoibusinessconsulting.com

Ma Foi Strategic Consultants, a division of CIEL Group, is a global management consulting firm headquartered in Chennai.

It was founded in 2012 as an evolution of the Ma Foi brand in India.

== History ==
=== Branding of Ma Foi : 1992 - 2012 ===
The inception of the brand 'Ma Foi' (pronounced "Ma Fwa") was in 1992 as "Ma Foi Management Consultants", a Chennai based HR service provider founded by K. Pandiarajan to tap into opportunities arising out of the 1991 economic liberalization policies in India.

On choosing the French name, the founder commented in an interview - "We were targeting the international market. So, Ma Foi -- or My Word -- symbolized what we wanted to say and do."

In 2004, Vedior NV, a Dutch head hunting firm acquired a majority stake in Ma Foi Management Consultants, to develop its business in South-East Asia and West Asia. Randstad NV acquired the operations of Ma Foi, through its December 2007 US$5.14 billion acquisition of Vedior. In April 2012, "Randstad India" replaced Ma Foi, which by then had become a brand in the professional recruitment space.

=== Evolution of Ma Foi Strategic Consultants: 2012 - till date ===
With Ma Foi, the founders gained a service spectrum that extended beyond recruitment especially in strategic consultancy; and on 5 April 2012, they announced that brand Ma Foi would exit from HR consulting services with the launch of a new venture focusing on management consulting and education space - Ma Foi Strategic Consultants Pvt. Ltd.

The venture will have investments of over INR 25 crore in the first three years. The new company got into an agreement with Randstad for using the brand Ma Foi for three years. Eventually, the brand would be bought over, depending on the legal approvals.

The company would set up two business management schools by 2013 end— in Chennai and Madurai. The eventual plan is to start a chain of management schools on a franchisee model.

== Organisation and operations ==
It is headquartered in Chennai, and employs over 50 employees. It is currently planning to acquire three to four companies and will open eight offices across the country.

== Marketing and branding ==
Ma Foi marketing campaigns have the slogan "From Managing People to Knowledge".

== Services ==
The company is in three verticals,

- Management consulting
- Research : Research and analytical organisation
- Education : management education and professional development
