= Maikash Akbarabadi =

Urdu writer (1902–1991)

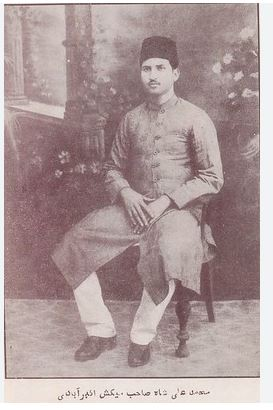
Syed Mohammad Ali Shah 'Jafri' Niazi - Maikash Akbarabadi

Maikash Akbarabadi (1902–1991) was a writer in the Urdu language. Syed Mohammed Ali Shah Maikash Akbarabadi was born in 1902, in the Mewa Katra family, which traces its links in India to Moghul times.

== Personal life ==
Muhammad Ali Shah Jafri Niyazi was the eldest son of Asghar Ali Shah Sahib who was the eldest son of Muzaffar Ali Shah Sahib, a renowned Sufi of his times and author of a huge book on Sufism which consists of three volumes entitled "Jawahar-e-Ghaibi". It is the best memorial of his literary accomplishments, published by Nawal Kishore Press Munshi Nawal Kishore. He was just two-and-a-half years old at the time of the death of his father, while his younger brother, Ahmed Ali Shah Saheb, was just three months old. The upbringing of these two very young children was left to their widowed mother who was then just twenty four years old. She was the granddaughter of Mir Aazam Ali, a contemporary of Ghalib Mirza Asad Ullah Khan Ghalib and belonged to a very respectable family. Despite pressures from certain sections upon her to go back to her parents' house, she stayed put and faced the challenges of life. She arranged for the best education of her children and sent them to Moulvi Sa'adat Ullah qadri Sahib, a very renowned "Mohaqiq" and "Mohadids" of his times, near Jama Masjid, Agra. Moulvi Sa'adat Ullah Sahib is said to have a dream of the Islamic prophet Muhammad only a few days back. There he had shown two young children and asked him to take best care of them and impart all necessary knowledge of Quran, Hadis, and Fiqh. He was on the lookout for them, and when he saw these two children he immediately recognized and welcomed them with full respect. They had the best of education at his hands and were awarded certificates of excellence. They were referred to Aligarh, M.A.O College in 1916, where in that time theology education was also imparted. These two boys were in their teens whereas in the college mosque there were very aged, senior students with long beards. Nazim-e-Deeniyaat of that time took their examination and was highly impressed with their knowledge, proficiency and method of recital. While he gave them certificates, he called the senior students for a demonstration, who are said to have carried these two young boys on their shoulders to various parts of the college in a procession.

== Education ==
Muhammad Ali Shah sahib then pursued further intensive studies of logic, fiqh and Tasawwuf, where as his younger brother was admitted to Baptist Mission High School. His younger brother, Ahmed Ali Shah, passed with distinction in all the examinations and studied at St. John's College to obtain post-graduation in Persian and a law degree from Allahabad University. He got involved in the worldly affairs of looking after the family affair first as an advocate and then as judicial and Administrative officer in erstwhile state of Rajputana. Ahmed Ali Shah retired as Civil Supplies Commissioner from Rajasthan and moved to Aligarh as the Registrar of Jamia Urdu (Seeds of which were sown at his residence in Mewa Katra). Prof Has Jafri, his only son settled in Aligarh and was Pro-Vice Chancellor, Registrar and Controller of Aligarh Muslim University before moving to Ajmer as the Member Rajasthan Public Service Commission.

== Death ==
He died on 10th Shawwal 1411 Hijri (1991 CE). After him, his eldest son Syed Moazzam Ali Shah Jafri Niazi, a professor of psychology at St John's College Agra took over the spiritual mantle. After him, then under the guidance and spiritual leadership of his grandson the present Sajjada Nasheen Hz Syed Ajmal Ali Shah Jafri Niazi, the message of love, peace and brotherhood which was so dear to Maikash Saheb continues to be propagated. Every year a function to commemorate and promote Urdu poetry is organized under the banner of Bazm E Maikash by Maikash Sahebs' great-grandson Syed Faizi Ali Shah Niazi in Agra, where people with significant contributions to the Urdu world are awarded.

== Gallery ==
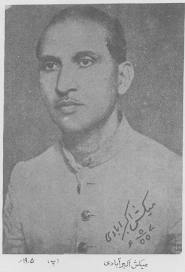
Maikash

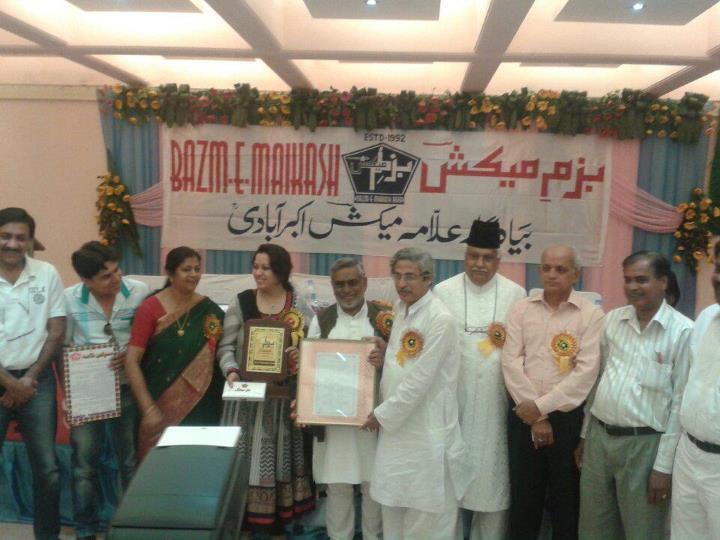
Bazm e Maikash, 2013

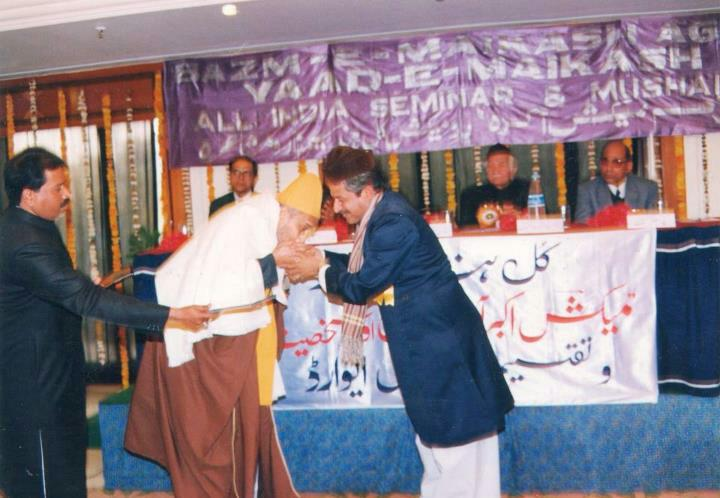
Syed Ajmal Ali Shah Niazi with Khwaja Hasan Sani Nizami at Bazm e Maikash

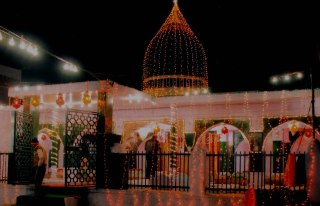
Panje Sharif

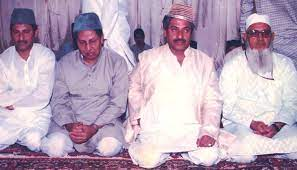
L to R: Syed Shabbar Ali Shah Jafri Niazi, Prof Hasan Ali Shah Jafri Niazi, Syed Ajmal Ali Shah Jafri Niazi

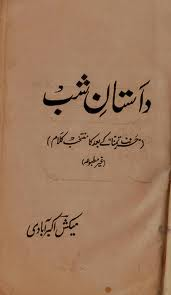
Daastan e shab

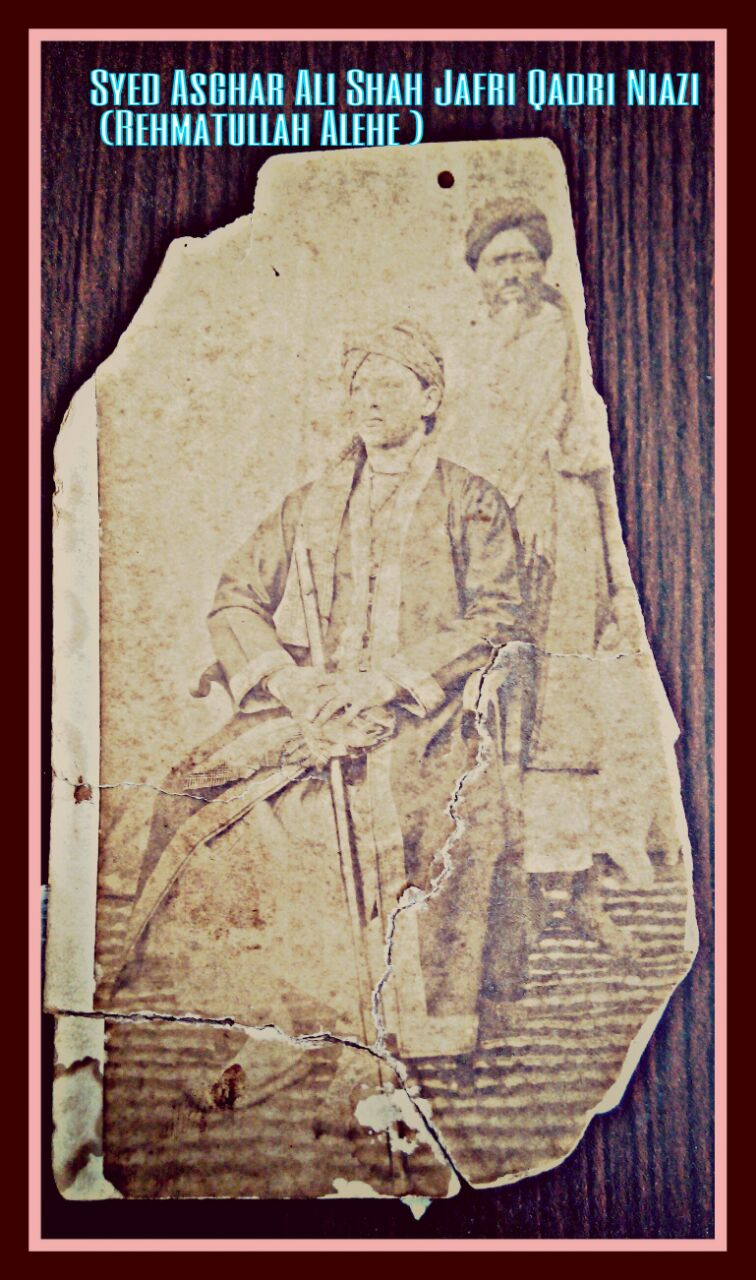
Asghar Ali shah Jafri Qadiri Niazi

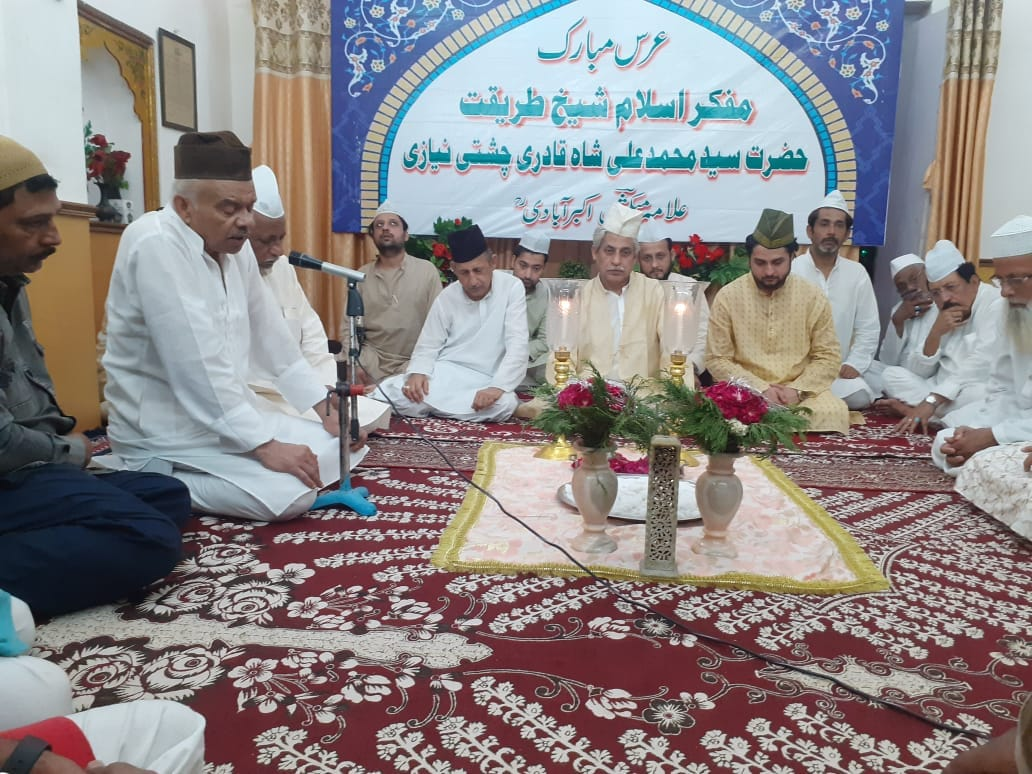
Urs Hz Maikash Akbarabadi 2022

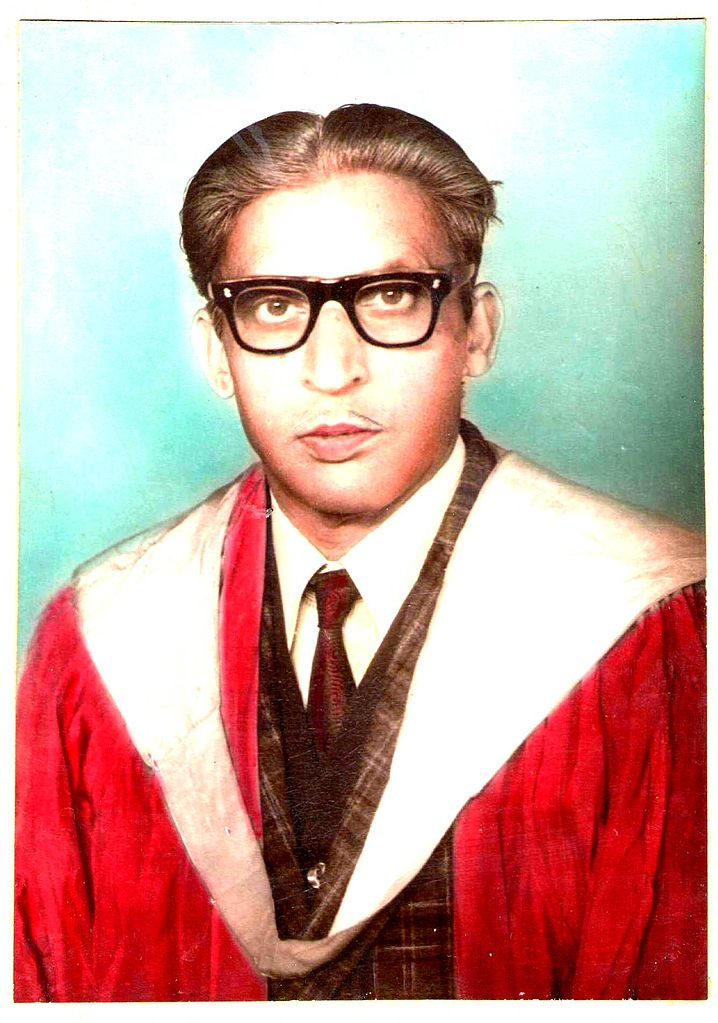
Moazamm Ali Shah Jafri Qadiri Niazi

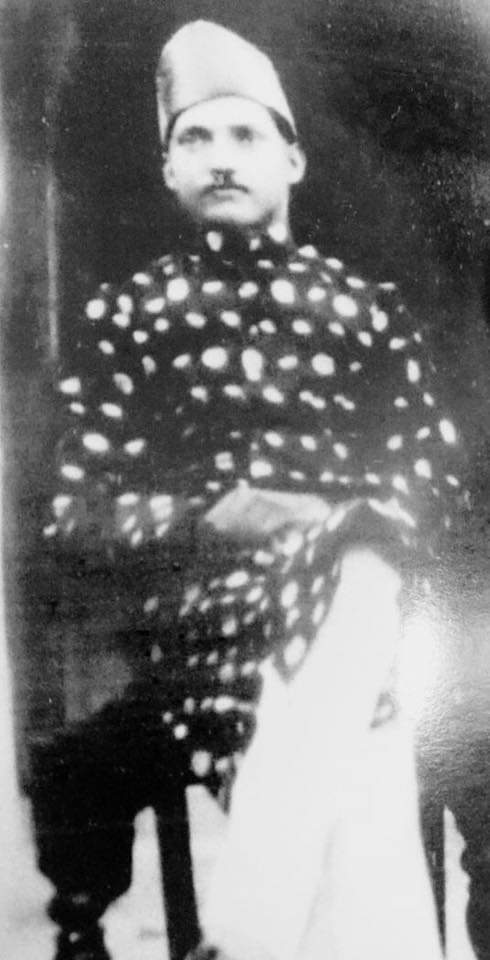
Ahmad Ali Shah Jafri

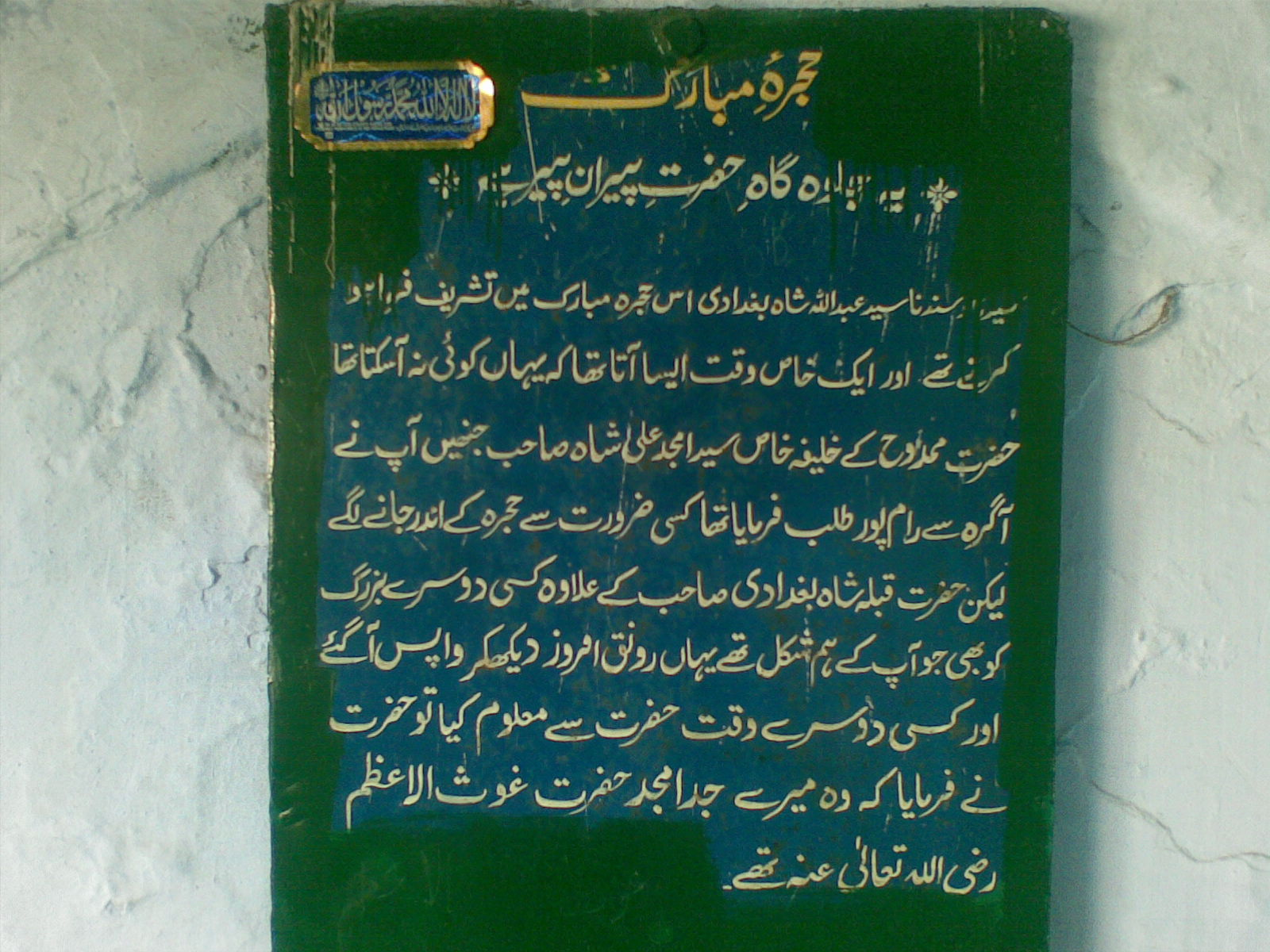
Dargah Abdullah Baghdadi

== External links and further reading ==
- Maikash Akbarabadi Poetry on Sufinama
- Website dedicated to Maikash Akbarabadi
- Blog Dedicated to SYED MOHAMMAD ALI SHAH JAFRI NIAZI'S KALAAM
- Maikash Akbarabadi in his own voice at Mushaira held in 1934
- Maikash Akbarabadi and Majaz
- Bazm e Maikash Videos on YouTube
- Khanqah Niazia Agra (Astaana Maikash Akbarabadi]
- Masail e Tasawwuf
- Touheed aur Shirk
- Farzand E Ghouse Azam

Syed Amjad Ali Shah Jafri Qadiri, Khalifa Hz Abdullah Baghdadi }	Succeeded by Syed Munawwar Ali Shah Jafri Qadiri
Succeeded by Syed Muzaffar Ali Shah Jafri Qadiri Niazi, Khalifa Hz Taj ul Aulia-Shah Niyaz Ahmad
Succeeded by Syed Asghar Ali Shah Jafri, "Chisht ke Dulha"
Succeeded by Syed Mohammad Ali Shah Jafri Niazi, Sajjada Nashin, Khanqah e Niazia Agra, Khalifa Hz Siraj us Salekin Shah Niyaz Ahmad
Succeeded by Syed Moazzam Ali Shah Jafri Niazi
Succeeded by Present: Syed Ajmal Ali Shah Jafri Niazi, Khalifa Hz Hasni Mian Sahab, Shah Niyaz Ahmad

- (Family Tree - Shijra) of Maikash Akbarabadi}

Afzal Ali Shah, Ajmal Ali Shah, Shabbar Ali Shah, Ahsan Ali Shah, Fahad Ali Shah, Yasser Ali Shah, Ghalib Ali Shah, Mukkarram Ali Shah, Mohatesham Ali Shah, Faizi Ali Shah, Faaiz Ali Shah, Naqi Ali Shah, Ahmad Ali Shah, Mohammad Ali Shah

1. 1. S/o Moazzam Ali Shah Jafri/Haider Ali Shah/Hasan Ali Shah Jafri

2. 2. S/o Mohammad Ali Shah Jafri "Maikash"/Syed Ahmad Ali Shah Jafri

3. 3. S/o S. Asghar Ali Shah

4. 4. S/o S. Muzaffar Ali Shah

5. 5. S/o S. Munawwar Ali Shah

6. 6. S/o S. Amjad Ali Shah

7. 7. S/o S. Ilham Ullah Jafri

8. 8. S/o S. KhalilUllah

9. 9. S/o S. Fateh Mohammed

10. 10. S/o S. Ibrahim Al Qutab Al Madani (came to India during the times of Mughal Emperor Jahangir)

11. 11. S/o S. Hasan Madani

12. 12. S/o S. Hussain Taifi

13. 13. S/o S. Abdullah Makki

14. 14. S/o S. Masoom

15. 15. S/o S.Ubaid Ullah Najafi

16. 16. S/o S. Hasan Madani

17. 17. S/o S. Jafar Makki

18. 18. S/o S. Murtuza Yamani

19. 19. S/o S. Mustafa Hameed Makki

20. 20. S/o S. Abdul Qadir Makki

21. 21. S/o S. Abdul Samad Kazim Madani

22. 22. S/o S. Abdul Rahim Madani

23. 23. S/o S. Masood Yamani

24. 24. S/o S.Mehmood Yamani

25. 25. S/o S. Hamza Najafi

26. 26. S/o S. Abdullah Karbalai

27. 27. S/o S. Naqi Makki

28. 28. S/o S. Ali Madani

29. 29. S/o S.Mohammad Asad Ullah Makki

30. 30. S/o S.Mohammad Yusuf Makki

31. 31. S/o S.Hussain Makki

32. 32. S/o S.Ishaque Al Madani

33. 33. S/o Imamul Mashariq Wal Maghrib Imam Jafar –e-Sadiq (AS)

34. 34. S/o Imam Mohammad Baqar(AS)

35. 35. S/o Imam Zainul Abedin (AS)

36. 36. S/o Shaheed-e-Karbala Imam Hussain (AS)

37. 37. Imamul Mashriq Wal Magharib Hazrat Ali (AS)

38. 38. Khatoon-e-Jannat Hazrat Bibi Fatima Zehra(AS)

39. 39. D/o Holy Prophet Mohammed
