= K. Pandiarajan =

Indian businessman and politician (born 1959)

Ma Foi K. Pandiarajan
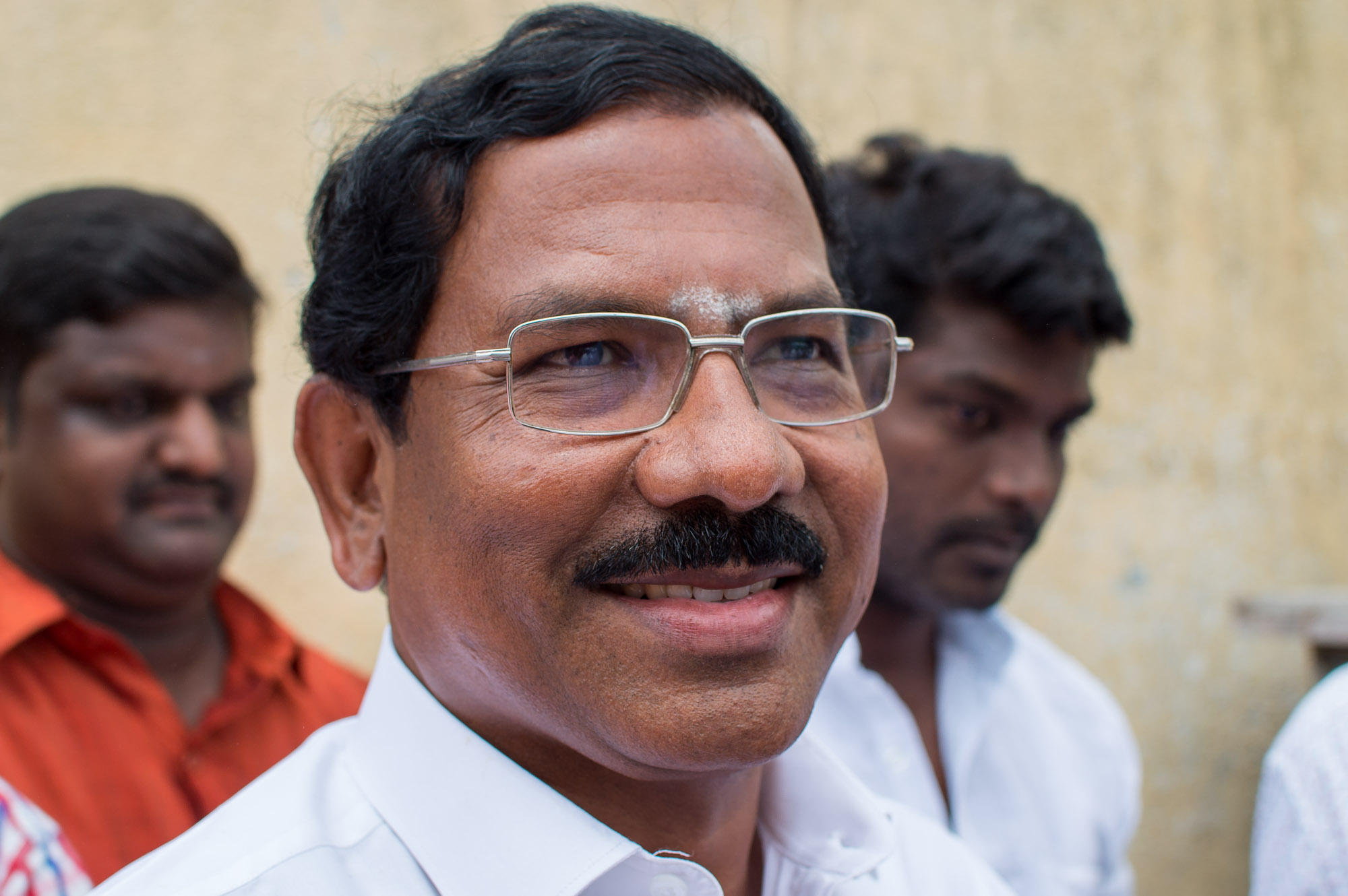
- K. Pandiarajan in Soosaiya Nagar, Chennai on 71st Independence Day of India.

Minister for Tamil Official Language, Tamil Culture and Archaeology
- In office 21 August 2017 – 6 May 2021
- Chief minister: Edappadi K. Palaniswami
- Preceded by: Sevvoor S. Ramachandran (2016)
- Succeeded by: Thangam Thennarasu
- Constituency: Avadi

Minister for School Education, Youth Affairs and Sports (Government of Tamil Nadu)
- In office 29 August 2016 – 17 May 2017
- Chief minister: J. Jayalalithaa; O. Panneerselvam
- Preceded by: P. Benjamin
- Succeeded by: K. A. Sengottaiyan

Member of Tamil Nadu legislative assembly
- In office 23 May 2016 – 6 May 2021
- Preceded by: S. Abdul Rahim
- Succeeded by: S. M. Nasar
- Constituency: Avadi
- In office 15 May 2011 – 22 May 2016
- Preceded by: R. Varadarajan
- Succeeded by: A. R. R. Seenivasan
- Constituency: Virudhunagar

Personal details
- Born: 13 May 1959 (age 67) Vilampatti, Sivakasi, Madras State
- Party: All India Anna Dravida Munnetra Kazhagam (2016-present)
- Other political affiliations: Desiya Murpokku Dravida Kazhagam (until 2016)
- Spouse: Hemalatha
- Children: Suhaas (son); Sunila (daughter)
- Education: PSG College of Technology, Coimbatore(BE); XLRI, Jamshedpur(MBA)
- Occupation: Businessman, Politician
- Portfolio: Chairman at Ma Foi Solutions

K. Pandiarajan (born 13 May 1959) popularly known as Ma Foi K. Pandiarajan is an Indian businessman and politician from Tamil Nadu. Ma Foi K. Pandiarajan is Minister of Avadi Constituency from 2016. He founded Ma Foi Management Consultants, a human resource management company acquired by Vedior and then Randstad NV, and CIEL HR Services. He served two terms as a member of the Tamil Nadu Legislative Assembly between 2011 and 2021, and also held ministerial office.

== Early life and education ==
K. Pandiarajan was born on 26 April 1959 in a village near Sivakasi, Virudhunagar district. When Pandiarajan was three months old, he lost his father, a worker in a local match factory. He was brought up by his maternal grandparents.

He finished his schooling from the Sivakasi Hindu Nadar Victoria School, Sivakasi and in 1976, enrolled at the PSG College of Technology, Coimbatore for an undergraduate course in Engineering. After earning his BE (Hons) degree, Pandiarajan enrolled for an MBA programme in Industrial Relations at Xavier Labour Relations Institute, Jamshedpur, which he completed in 1984.

== Career ==
After graduating from XLRI in 1984, he joined the Indian operations of an industrial gas multi-national BOC Group and later Deutsche Babcock. In 1992, he co-founded Ma Foi Management Consultants along with his wife, to tap into opportunities arising out of the 1991 economic liberalisation policy in India. The initial focus of Ma Foi was placing middle-level and managerial people overseas, especially in West Asia. In 2002, Ma Foi partnered with Editor, a Dutch head-hunting firm looking to expand their operations in West Asia and South-East Asia. He sold a majority of his stake in Ma Foi to Vedior in 2004. In 2007, Randstad NV acquired the operations of Ma Foi through its US$5.14 billion acquisition of Vedior. Pandiarajan became the Chairman of Randstad India.

On 5 April 2012, he announced the launch of a new venture focusing on management consulting and education space, Ma Foi Strategic Consultants, with investments of over ₹ 250 million in the first three years. The new company had an agreement with Randstad for using the brand Ma Foi for three years. Pandiarajan, along with a few Ma Foi veterans, re-entered the HR Services industry with the launch of CIEL HR Services in August 2015. CIEL HR focuses on talent acquisition for companies and flex staffing using modern analytical tools.

=== Political career: 2000 – till date ===
Pandiarajan joined the Desiya Murpokku Dravida Kazhagam (DMDK) party founded by actor turned politician Vijaykanth . He contested in the 2011 Tamil Nadu Legislative Assembly election and won from the Virudhunagar constituency with a margin of 21,286. He switched loyalties to the AIADMK in 2013. On 26 February 2016, he along with 9 DMDK MLAs joined the AIADMK. He won the Avadi constituency in the 2016 Tamil Nadu Legislative Assembly election as an AIADMK candidate. Pandiarajan was appointed Minister for School Education, Youth Welfare and Sports by the former Tamil Nadu Chief Minister, J. Jayalalithaa on 29 August 2016. He remained in her cabinet until her death on 5 December 2016. He half-heartedly supported the appointment of V. K. Sasikala as General Secretary of AIADMK before deciding to support the Panneerselvam faction when Panneerselvam turned against Sasikala

In February 2017, following the appointment of Edappadi K. Palaniswami as Chief Minister in place of O. Paneerselvam, K. A. Sengottaiyan replaced Pandiarajan as Minister for School Education. Pandiarajan was the only cabinet minister to have supported Paneerselvam during a party dispute in which V. K. Sasikala was being touted as a possible Chief Minister. The appointment of Sengottaiyan was the only change made to the cabinet by Palaniswami at that time.

On 21 August 2017, with the merger of AIADMK factions headed by Edappadi K. Palaniswami and O. Panneerselvam, Pandiarajan was again sworn in as a cabinet minister with portfolios of archaeology, Tamil language and Culture.

== Personal life ==
Pandiarajan lives in Avadi with his wife, Hemalatha. He has two children.
