= R. Ramesh Kumar =

Indian politician (born 1966)

Rajkumar Ramesh Kumar (born 1966) is an Indian politician from Tamil Nadu. He is a member of the Tamil Nadu Legislative Assembly from Avadi Assembly constituency in Thiruvallur district representing Tamilaga Vettri Kazhagam.

== Early life and education ==
Kumar is from Royapuram, Chennai, Tamil Nadu. He is the son of Raj Kumar. He completed his BA in 1986 at the New College which is affiliated with the University of Madras. He serves as the principal of St. John's School.

== Political career ==
Kumar became an MLA for the first time winning the 2026 Tamil Nadu Legislative Assembly election from Avadi Assembly constituency representing Tamilaga Vettri Kazhagam. He polled 1,80,384 votes and defeated his nearest rival, S. M. Nasar of the Dravida Munnetra Kazhagam, by a margin of 76,311 votes.
