= Paruthipattu Lake =

Indian lake

- Location in metropolitan Chennai
- Location: Avadi, Chennai, India
- Coordinates: 13.107°N 80.106°E
- Type: Lake
- Basin countries: India
- Surface area: 22 hectares (54 acres)
- Average depth: 12 ft (3.7 m)

Paruthipattu Lake, also known as Avadi Lake, is a lake in Chennai, Tamil Nadu, India. It is located in the Avadi locality of Chennai. It is the second eco-park in the city after Chetput Lake.

== History ==
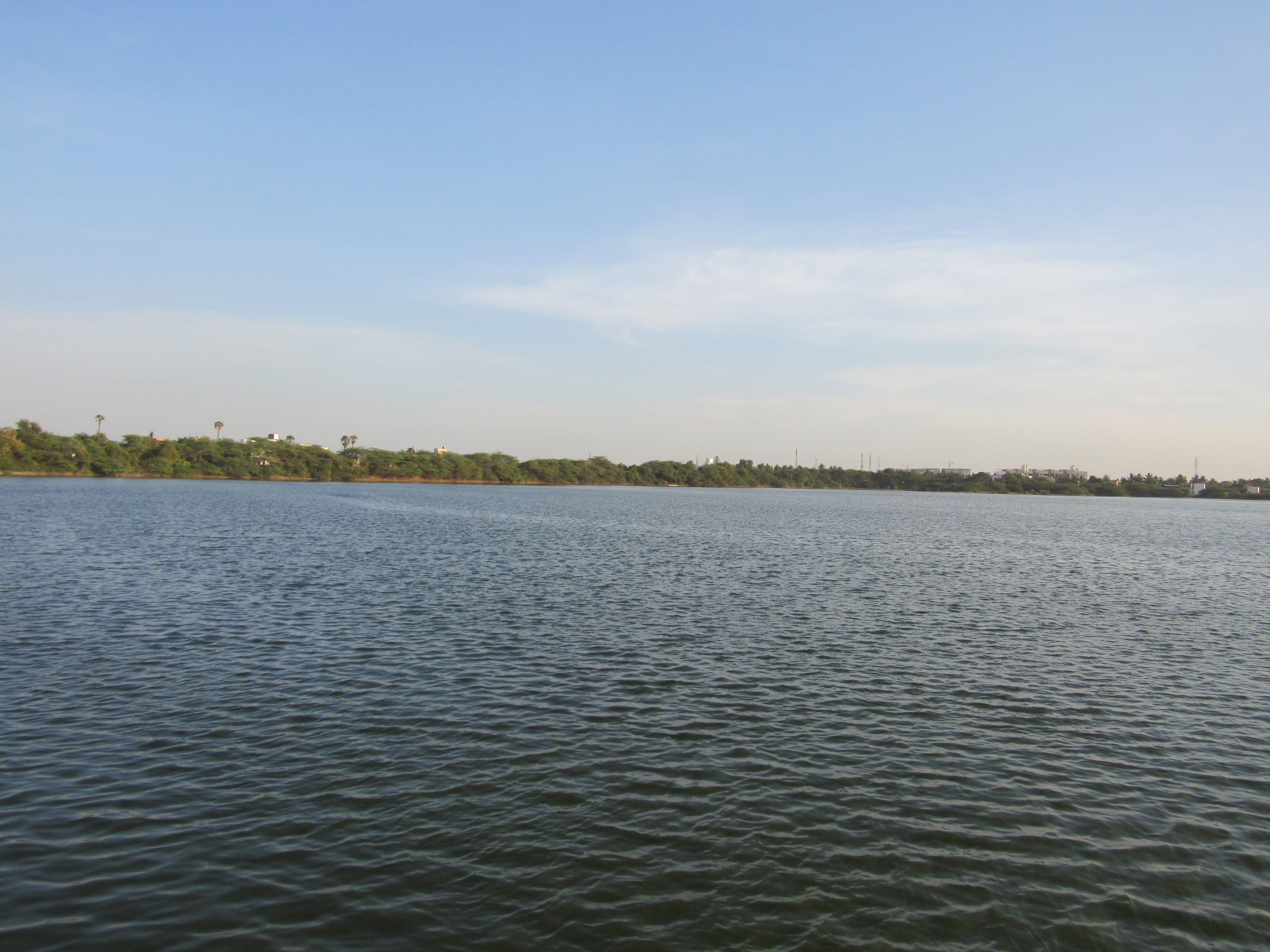
A view of the Avadi lake before renovation

The lake remained one of the neglected waterbodies in the western suburbs for long, shrinking to 8 acres (3.2 ha). In 2018, the Water Resources Department restored the lake at a cost of ₹ 280 million in two phases, developing it into an eco-tourism spot. The lake eco-park was opened to public on 21 June 2019. The renovation involved relocation of approximately 500 people.

== Lake ==
Avadi Lake lies right behind the Tamil Nadu Housing Board (TNHB) and Thirumullaivoyal. This lake is of length of 2.64 kilometers and covers an area of 8 acres before the restoration. It is mostly known to have never dried up in many years. This lake has supposedly been a source of water for cultivation of farm lands long before. The water body attracts many birds during various seasons.

The lake is fed by surplus water from the unpolluted stretch of the Cooum River. The lake serves as a source for groundwater recharge in the neighbouring areas, such as Adhiparasakthi Nagar and Govardhanagiri. The average depth is 12 feet.

However, in recent decades the lake has lost most of its area to indiscriminate building and encroachment. These are the major problems at present, since the water of the monsoon showers moves inside of the buildings as they are in the area of the lake.

== Restoration ==
The eco-park surrounding the lake consists of a 3-km-long walking track, children's play area, refreshment block, a central plaza for public gathering, a boat deck with three landing areas, a couple of islands for nesting birds, an open-air theatre, an administration office building, and vehicle parking lot. About 35 varieties of plants have been planted around the lake.

A sewage treatment plant has been built on the shore at a cost of ₹ 350 million to treat sewage from the Avadi municipality. The facility will pump 10 million litres of recycled water into the lake, besides selling an equal amount of water for industrial use.

== See also ==
- Water management in Chennai
