= Frits Goldschmeding =

Dutch businessman (1933–2024)

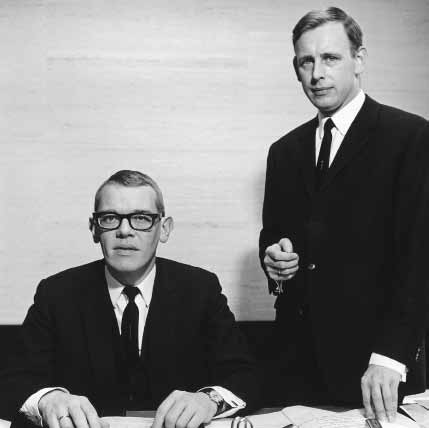
- Founders Ger Daleboudt and Frits Goldschmeding, eight years after starting their company
- Born: Frederik Johannes Diederik Goldschmeding; 2 August 1933; Amsterdam, Netherlands
- Died: 26 July 2024 (aged 90)
- Education: VU University Amsterdam
- Occupations: Businessman and academic
- Known for: Founder, Randstad NV
- Children: 3

Frederik Johannes Diederik "Frits" Goldschmeding (2 August 1933 – 26 July 2024) was a Dutch billionaire businessman, founder of Randstad NV, one of the largest staffing companies worldwide.

== Early life ==
Goldschmeding was born on 2 August 1933 as Frederik Johannes Diederik Goldschmeding. He had a doctorate from VU University Amsterdam.

== Career ==
Goldschmeding founded Uitzendbureau Amstelveen (later Randstad) with fellow economics student Ger Daleboudt in 1960, while studying at Amsterdam's Vrije University. The two came up with the idea for the business as they were cycling back from a fraternity party at 2:00 a.m. They established their first office in their dorm room. In 1964, they renamed it Randstad NV. Goldschmeding took Randstad public in 1990 and, in 2008, merged it with the Dutch group Vedior. According to Forbes, Goldschmeding had a 35% stake in the company, and a net worth of US$5.8 billion, as of July 2024.

He was also a professor at the Centre for Entrepreneurship at Nyenrode Business University.

== Personal life and death ==
Married with three children, Goldschmeding lived in Amsterdam, Netherlands. He died on 26 July 2024, at the age of 90.

== See also ==
- List of Dutch by net worth
