= Ordnance Clothing Factory =

Indian clothing company

- Industry: Military clothing
- Headquarters: India
- Key people: shri B S Reddy IOFS
- Parent: Troop Comforts Limited(current); Ordnance Factories Board(former)

Ordnance Clothing Factory is an Indian clothing manufacturing company run by the Ordnance Factories Board, Government of India.

== About the Factory ==
This organisation comes under Indian Ordnance Factories, which in turn comes under the aegis of Ordnance Factory Board (OFB), having its headquarters in Kolkata. All these organisation come under the control of Ministry of Defence, Government of India.

The factory more particularly is controlled by Ordnance Equipment Factories Group having its headquarters at Kanpur, Uttar Pradesh, India, which itself is a key operating division under Ordnance Factory Board (OFB).

Among the approximately forty factories under Indian Ordnance Factories, there are two Ordnance Clothing Factories. The Ordnance Clothing Factory at Avadi (OCFAV), near Chennai and Ordnance Clothing Factory at Shahjahanpur (OCFS), near Bareilly, Uttar Pradesh.

== Production ==
The Factory at Avadi, Chennai produces combat shirts, combat jackets, trousers, shorts, tents, disposable shirts and parachutes for the Defence Forces. OCFAV recently started production of bullet proof jackets and bullet proof vests.

The Factory at Shahjahanpur, Uttar Pradesh produces winter clothing, high altitude clothing, uniforms, blankets, woollen knitwear and mosquito nets for the Defence Forces.

Products
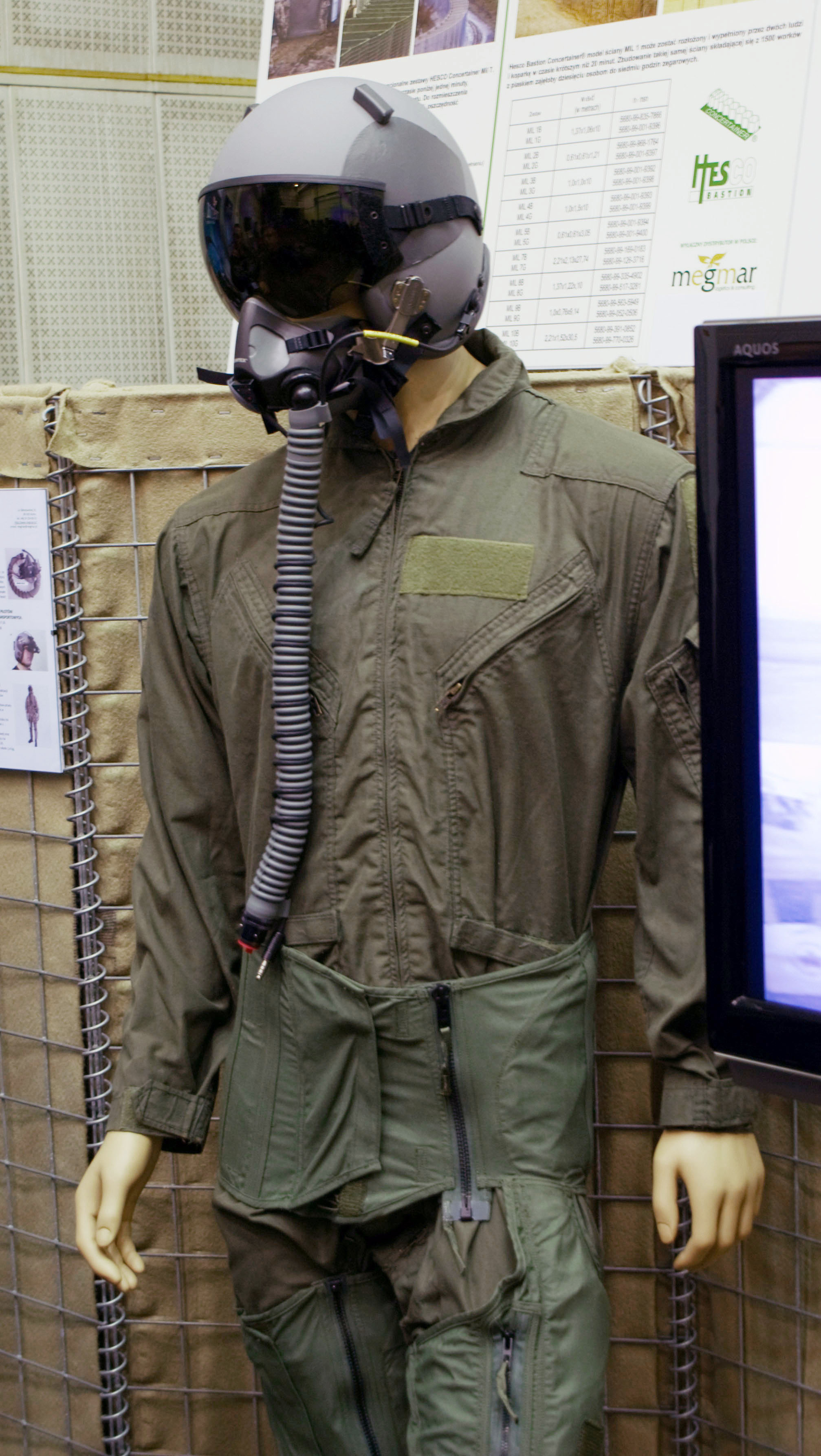
g-suits for Indian Air Force pilots flying the supersonic aircraft

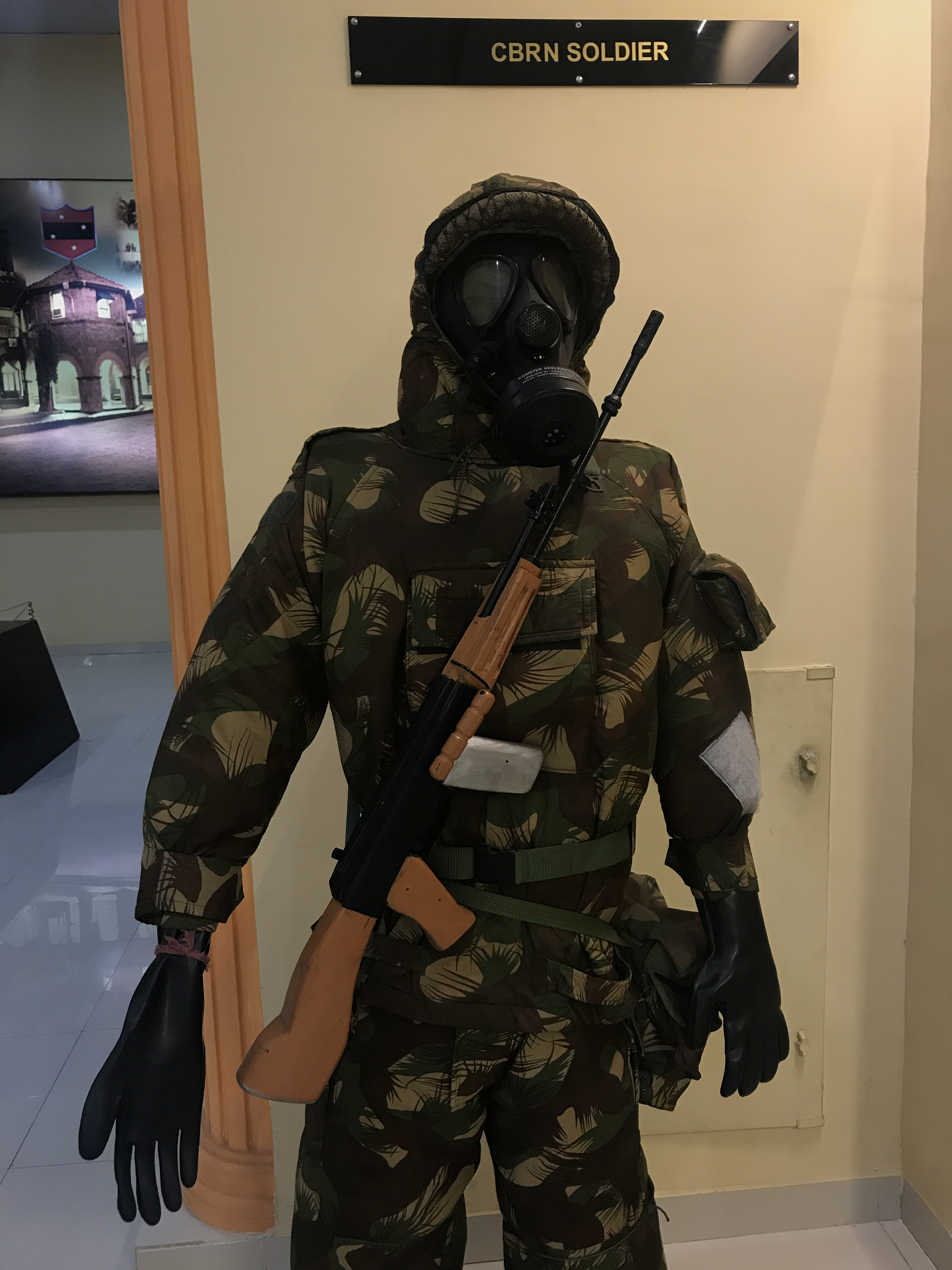
Chemical, biological, radiological and nuclear (CBRN) suit

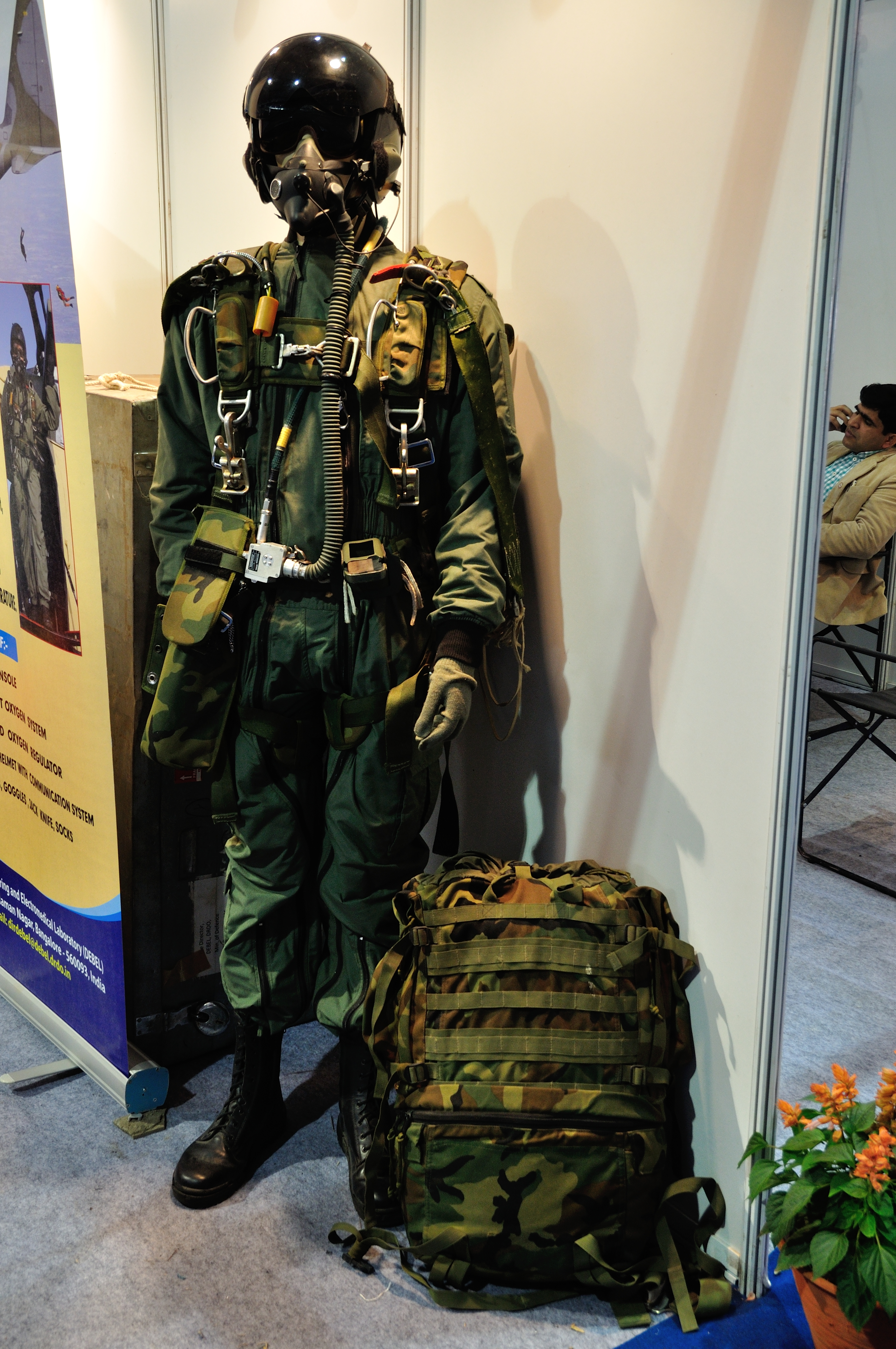
Combat Free Fall Parachute System

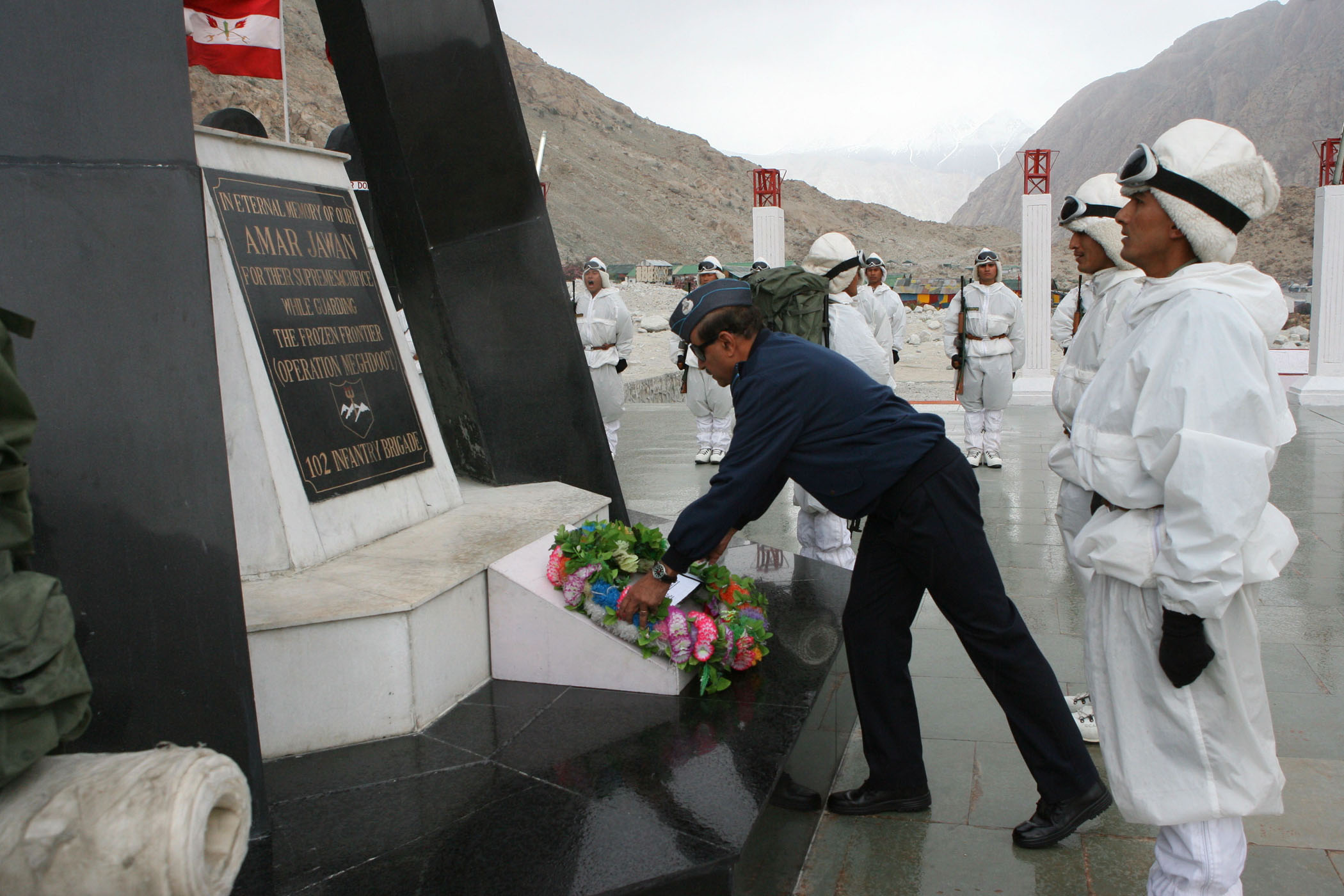
High-altitude, low-temperature, waterproof combat uniforms

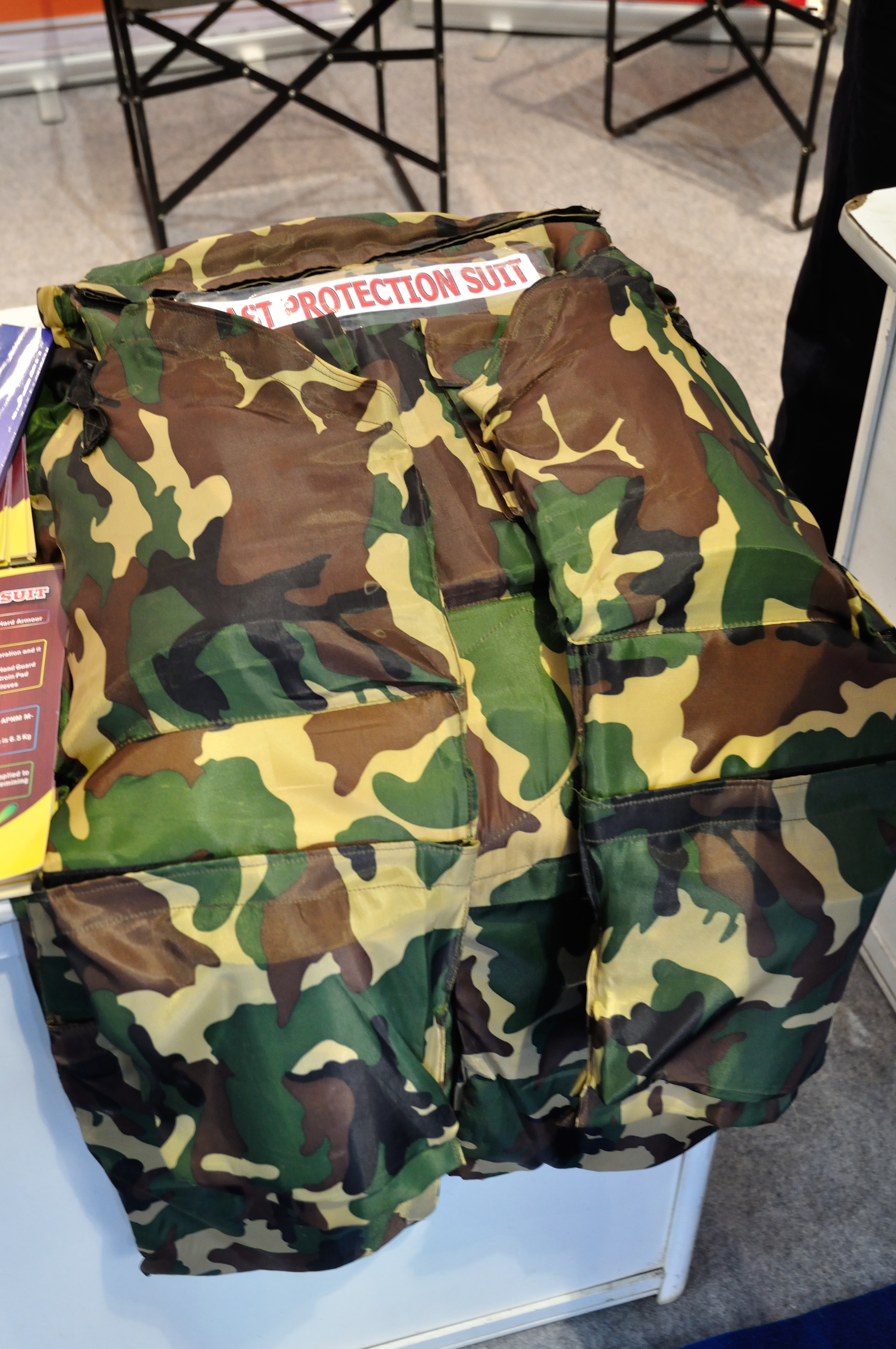
Bomb Blast Protection Suit

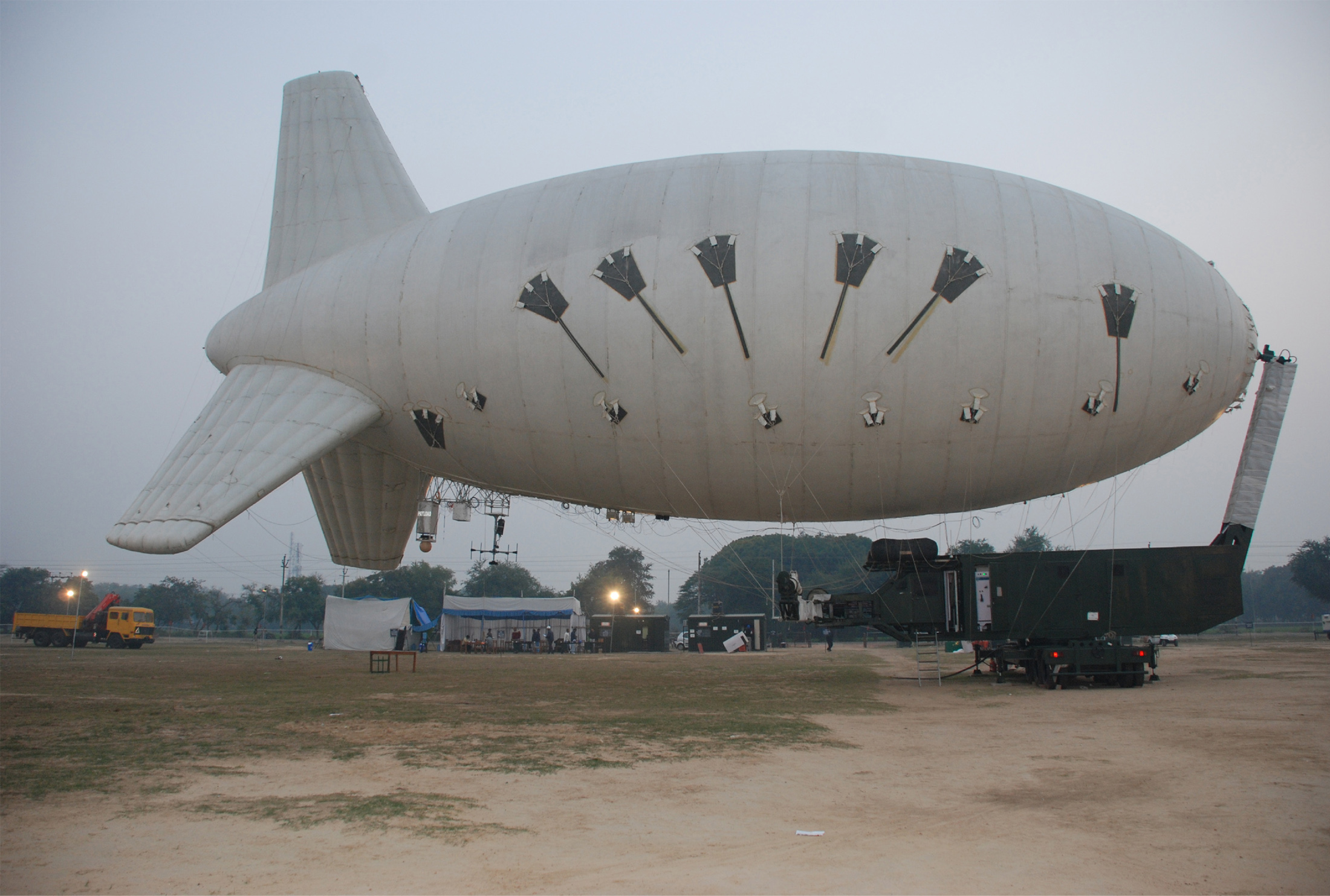
Aerostat system used in field telecommunication

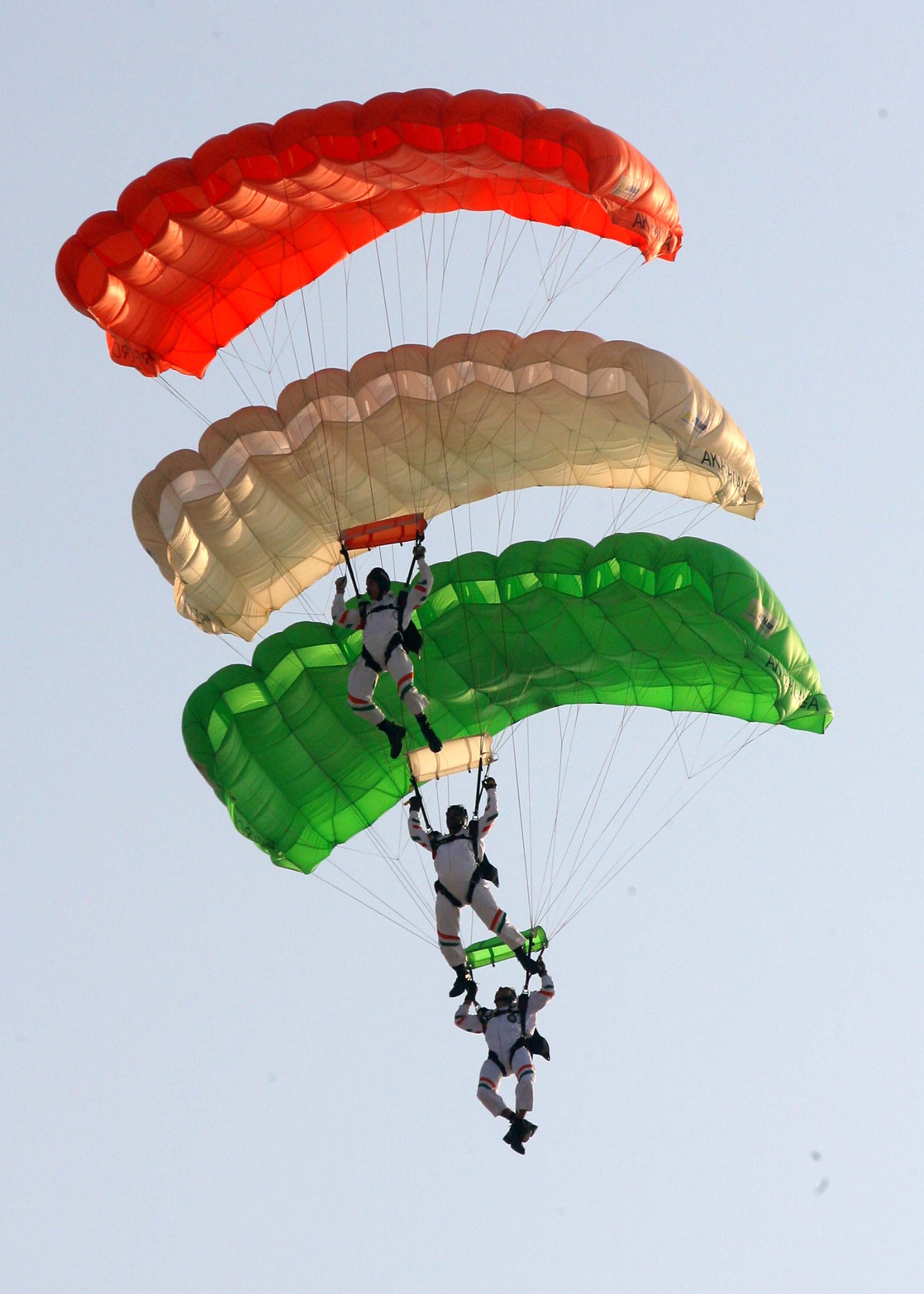
Parachutes

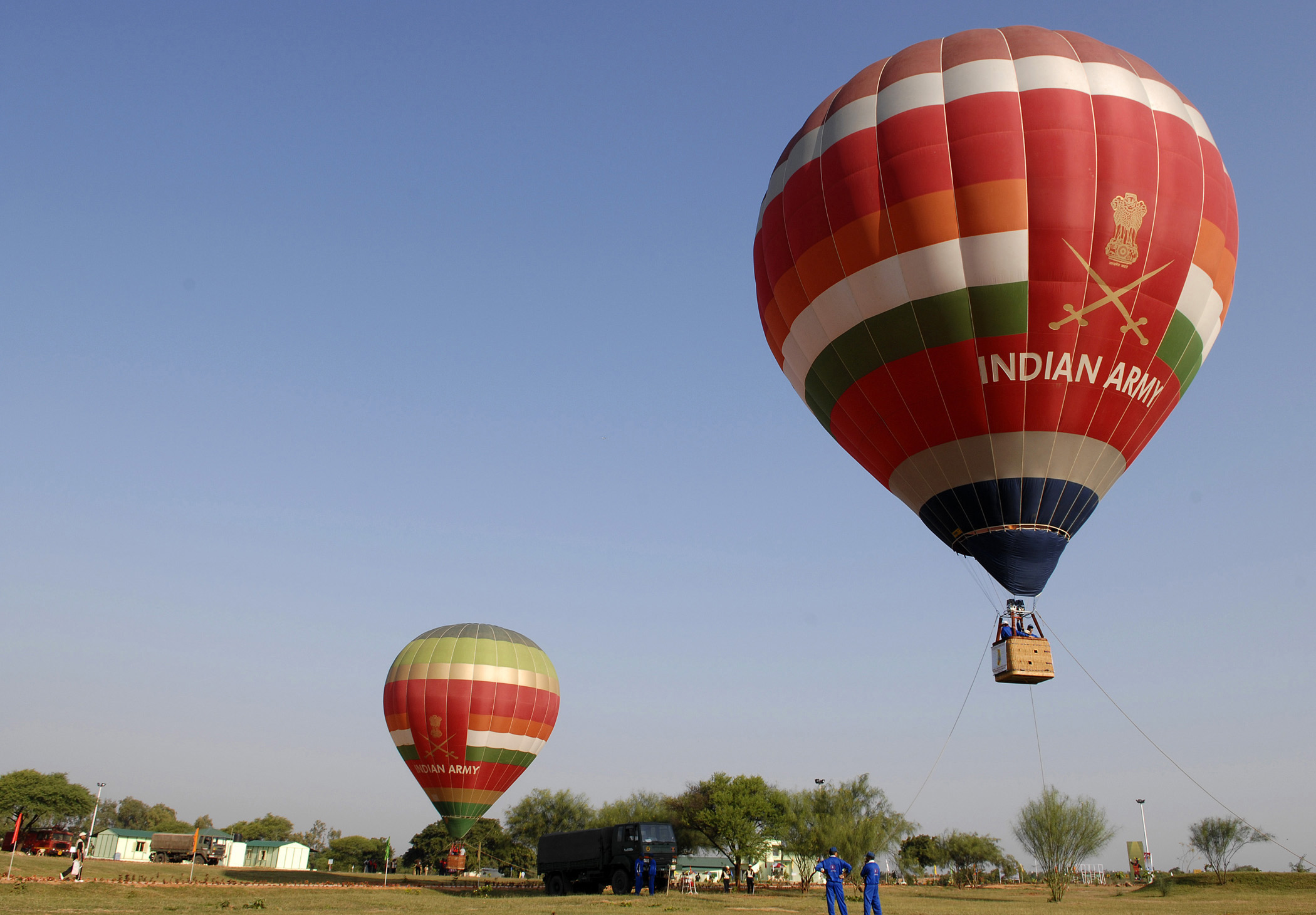
Hot air balloons

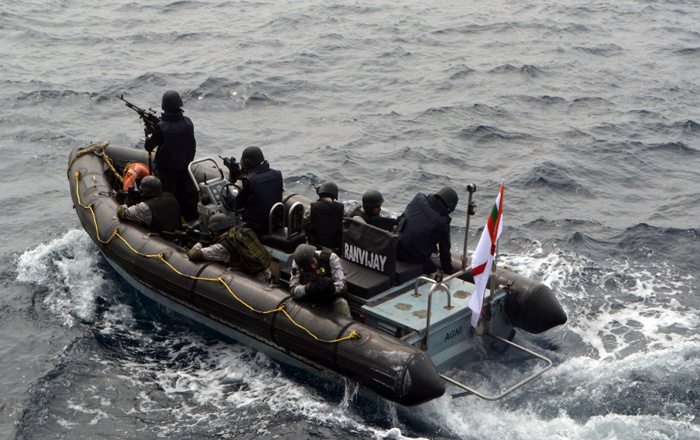
Inflatable boat Prashant

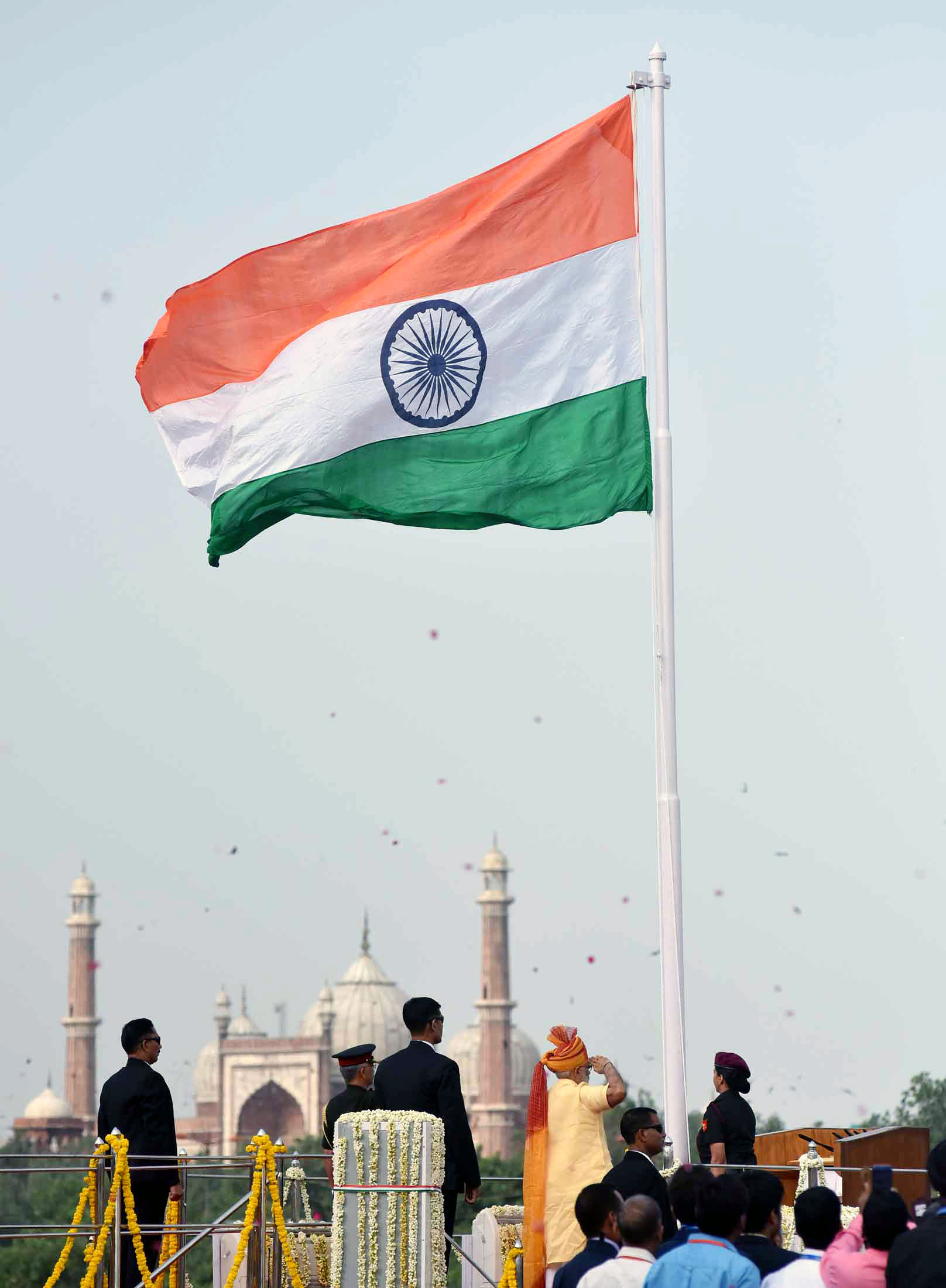
Ordnance Clothing Factory Shahjahanpur supplies the Indian National Flag hoisted by the Prime Minister of India on the Independence Day at the Red Fort in New Delhi

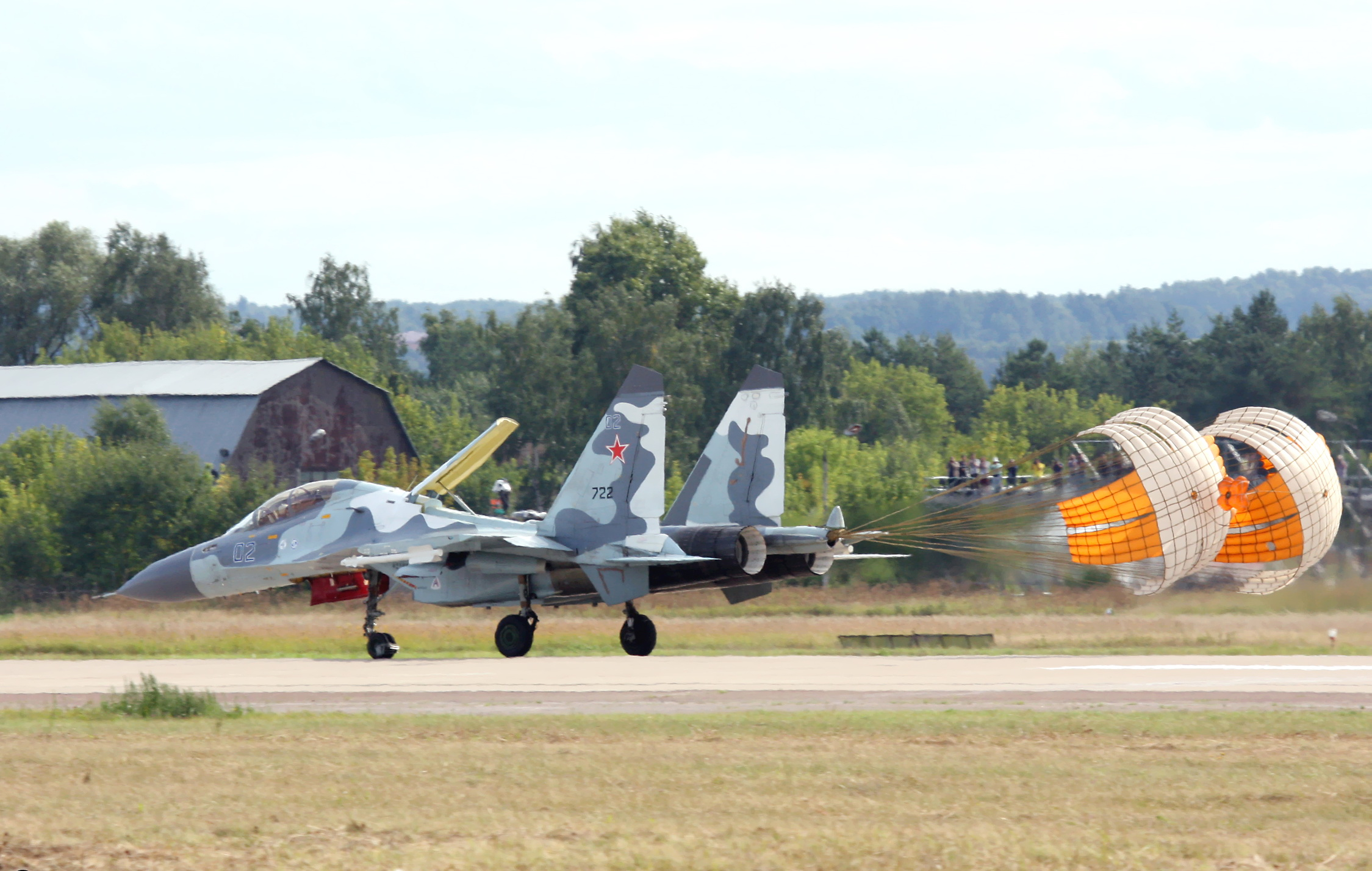
Brake Parachutes for the aircraft of the Indian Air Force
