= Khanqah-e-Niazia =

Dargah in Bareilly

Khanqah-e-Niazia is a Khanqah in Bareilly in Uttar Pradesh, it was established by Shah Niyaz Ahmad Barelvi in 1773. It is headed by Shah Mehdi Miyan, Sajjada Nasheen of the Khanqah since 2020.

== Festivals ==
The Khanqah celebrates Jashn-e-Chirag, a tradition of more than 300 years. It is believed to be a festival of Ganga-Jamuni tehzeeb. The Urs is celebrated annually on 6th of Jumadus Sani.
