= Avadi Assembly constituency =

State Legislative Assembly Constituency in Tamil Nadu

Coordinates: 13.12°N 80.1°E

Avadi
- Constituency No. 6 for the Tamil Nadu Legislative Assembly

Constituency details
- Country: India
- Region: South India
- State: Tamil Nadu
- District: Thiruvallur
- Lok Sabha constituency: Thiruvallur
- Established: 2008
- Total electors: 436,177
- Reservation: None

Member of Legislative Assembly
- 17th Tamil Nadu Legislative Assembly
- Incumbent R. Ramesh Kumar
- Party: TVK

Avadi is a state assembly constituency in Tamil Nadu, India, newly formed after the 2008 constituency delimitation. Its State Assembly Constituency number is 6. It consists of a portion of Avadi taluk and includes Avadi. It is included in Thiruvallur Lok Sabha constituency. It is one of the 234 State Legislative Assembly Constituencies in Tamil Nadu.

== Members of the Legislative Assembly ==
| Election | Member | Party |
|---|---|---|
| 2011 | S. Abdul Rahim | All India Anna Dravida Munnetra Kazhagam |
| 2016 | K. Pandiarajan | All India Anna Dravida Munnetra Kazhagam |
| 2021 | S. M. Nasar | Dravida Munnetra Kazhagam |
| 2026 | R. Ramesh Kumar | Tamilaga Vettri Kazhagam |

== Election results ==
=== Assembly election 2026 ===
2026 Tamil Nadu Legislative Assembly election : Avadi
| Party | Candidate | Votes | % | ±% |
|---|---|---|---|---|
| TVK | R. Ramesh Kumar | 180,384 | 52.13% | New |
| DMK | S. M. Nasar | 104,073 | 30.08% | ▼20.26 |
| BJP | Rajasimha Mahendra | 39,605 | 11.45% | New |
| NTK | Punitha Shanmugam | 16,335 | 4.72% | ▼5.36 |
| NOTA | None of the above | 1,533 | 0.44% | ▼0.36 |
| Margin of victory | | 76,311 | 22.05% | ▲3.54 |
| Turnout | | 346,358 | 79.34% | ▲11.16 |
| Total valid votes | | 346,005 | | |
| Registered electors | | 436,522 | | ▼1.42 |
| TVK gain from DMK | | Swing | ▲1.79 | |

=== Assembly election 2021 ===
2021 Tamil Nadu Legislative Assembly election : Avadi
| Party | Candidate | Votes | % | ±% |
|---|---|---|---|---|
| DMK | S. M. Nasar | 150,287 | 50.34% | ▲10.94 |
| AIADMK | K. Pandiarajan | 95,012 | 31.82% | ▼8.10 |
| NTK | G. Vijayalakshmi | 30,087 | 10.08% | ▲8.49 |
| MNM | V. Udhayakumar | 17,092 | 5.73% | New |
| NOTA | None of the above | 2,381 | 0.80% | ▼1.04 |
| DMDK | N. M. Sankar | 1,911 | 0.64% | New |
| Margin of victory | | 55,275 | 18.51% | ▲17.99 |
| Turnout | | 301,916 | 68.18% | ▲0.26 |
| Total valid votes | | 298,546 | | |
| Rejected ballots | | 989 | 0.33% | ▲0.32 |
| Registered electors | | 442,831 | | ▲11.09 |
| DMK gain from AIADMK | | Swing | ▲10.42 | |

=== Assembly election 2016 ===
2016 Tamil Nadu Legislative Assembly election : Avadi
| Party | Candidate | Votes | % | ±% |
|---|---|---|---|---|
| AIADMK | K. Pandiarajan | 108,064 | 39.92% | ▼15.26 |
| DMK | S. M. Nasar | 106,669 | 39.40% | New |
| MDMK | R. Anthridoss | 22,848 | 8.44% | New |
| PMK | N. Anandakrishnan | 12,428 | 4.59% | New |
| BJP | J. Loganathan | 7,232 | 2.67% | ▲0.77 |
| NOTA | None of the above | 4,994 | 1.84% | New |
| NTK | S. Nallathambi | 4,301 | 1.59% | New |
| Margin of victory | | 1,395 | 0.52% | ▼21.15 |
| Turnout | | 270,750 | 67.92% | ▲67.92 |
| Total valid votes | | 270,732 | | |
| Rejected ballots | | 18 | 0.01% | |
| Registered electors | | 398,613 | | ▲43.45 |
| AIADMK hold | | Swing | ▼15.26 | |

=== Assembly election 2011 ===
2011 Tamil Nadu Legislative Assembly election : Avadi
| Party | Candidate | Votes | % | ±% |
|---|---|---|---|---|
| AIADMK | S. Abdul Rahim | 110,102 | 55.18% | New |
| INC | R. Dhamotharan | 66,864 | 33.51% | New |
| Independent | B. Jayaraman | 10,460 | 5.24% | New |
| BJP | J. Loganathan | 3,795 | 1.90% | New |
| BSP | C. Sathyamurthi | 1,658 | 0.83% | New |
| JMM | D. Bakthavachalu | 1,336 | 0.67% | New |
| Margin of victory | | 43,238 | 21.67% | |
| Total valid votes | | 199,538 | | |
| Rejected ballots | | 276 | 0.00% | |
| Registered electors | | 277,885 | | |
| AIADMK win (new seat) | | | | |
