= S. Abdul Rahim =

Indian politician

S. Abdul Rahim is an Indian politician who was a member of the 14th Tamil Nadu Legislative Assembly. He represented All India Anna Dravida Munnetra Kazhagam party from Avadi constituency.

He held office as Minister for Backward Classes & Minority Welfare.

The elections of 2016 resulted in his constituency being won by K. Pandiarajan.

== Political life ==
Rahim joined All India Anna Dravida Munnetra Kazhagam at the age of 18 and he served twice as deputy chairman of Avadi municipality.
