= Shah Niyaz Ahmad =

South Asian Sufi figure (1742–1834)

Personal life
- Born: 1742
- Died: 1834 (aged 91–92)
- Resting place: Khanqah-e-Niazia, Bareilly

Religious life
- Religion: Sunni Islam
- Denomination: Sunni
- Jurisprudence: Hanafi

Shah Niyaz Ahmad (1742-1834) was a Sufi, poet and author from India.

== Life and death ==
Shah was born on 6th Jumada al-Thani 1155 Hijri (7 August 1742) and died on 6th Jumada al-Thani 1250 Hijri (9 October 1834). His Tomb lies in the city Bareilly Sharif of Uttar Pradesh.

== Parental lineage ==
He was descendant of 4th Rashidun Caliph Ali. He was an Alvi Syed from his paternal line and his mother was Rizvi Syed. His great-grandfathers belonged to the royal family of Bukhara. Among his great-grandfathers Shah Ayaat-ul-lah Alvi left the sultanate and settled in Multan. His grandson Azmatullah Alvi came to Sirhind. His son Elahi Shah Muhammad later settled in Delhi. He was the father of Niyaz. He was appointed Chief Justice in Delhi. He earned the title of "Hakim-e-Elahi". Shah Niyaz was born in Sirhind and came to Delhi with his father. His mother's name was Bibi Laado but she was famous by the name of Bibi Gharib Nawaz. She was descendant of Musa al-Kazim.

== Education ==
His primary education started at home under the guidance of his maternal grandfather Sa'id-ud-din. Later he was educated at Madrasa Faqriya Delhi. He completed his education including Quran, Hadith, Tafseer, Fiqh at the age of 15. He then became a teacher there. He later became the principal of the madrasa.

== Initiation in Sufi Order ==
Niyaz got his Sufi training from Sayed Fakhar-uddin Muhammad Dehalvi, also known as Fakhr-e-Jahan, in Bareilly, (Uttar Pradesh, India). Later, Niyaz was inducted in Qadiriyya order by Abdullah Shah Baghdadi, who was direct descendant of Abdul Qadir Jilani. Shah Niyaz also received spiritual blessings from other saints of other Sufi orders. He was initiated in Qadiriyya order by Syed Abdullah Baghdadi and Mohi-ud-din Diyasnami, in Chisti-Nizami order by Moulana Fakhar-e-Jahan and Said-ud-din, in Suharwardi order by Fakhar-e-Jahan, and in Chisti-Sabri-Naqshbandi order by Shah Rahmat-ul-lah.

The Sufi order he established is known as the Niyazi Silsila.

== Marriage and children ==
He married twice. His first wife, who was daughter of Abdullah Baghdadi, died after some years in marriage. He had two sons, Shah Nizam-ud-din Husain and Shah Nasir-ud-din, from his second wife.

He died on 6th Jumada al-Thani 1250 Hijri (9 October 1834) in Bareilly, where his tomb located. His urs (death anniversary) is celebrated annually in a traditional way.

== Khalifa (Caliphs) ==
His eldest son Nizamuddin Hussain was his premier khalifa and successor. Other prominent khulafa included Syed Muhammed Sani of Badakshan, Maulvi Abdul Latif of Samarkand, Maulvi Naimatullah of Kabul, Maulvi Yar Muhammed of Kabul, Mulla Jan Muhammed of Kabul, Maulana Waz Muhammed of Badakshan, Maulvi Muhammed Husain of Mecca, Mirza Asadullah Baig of Bareilly, Mirza Agha Muhammad of Jabalpur, Maulvi Ubiadullah of Mansehra and Shah Miskeen Jaipuri.
