= Randstad (company) =

Dutch human resource consulting firm

Randstad NV

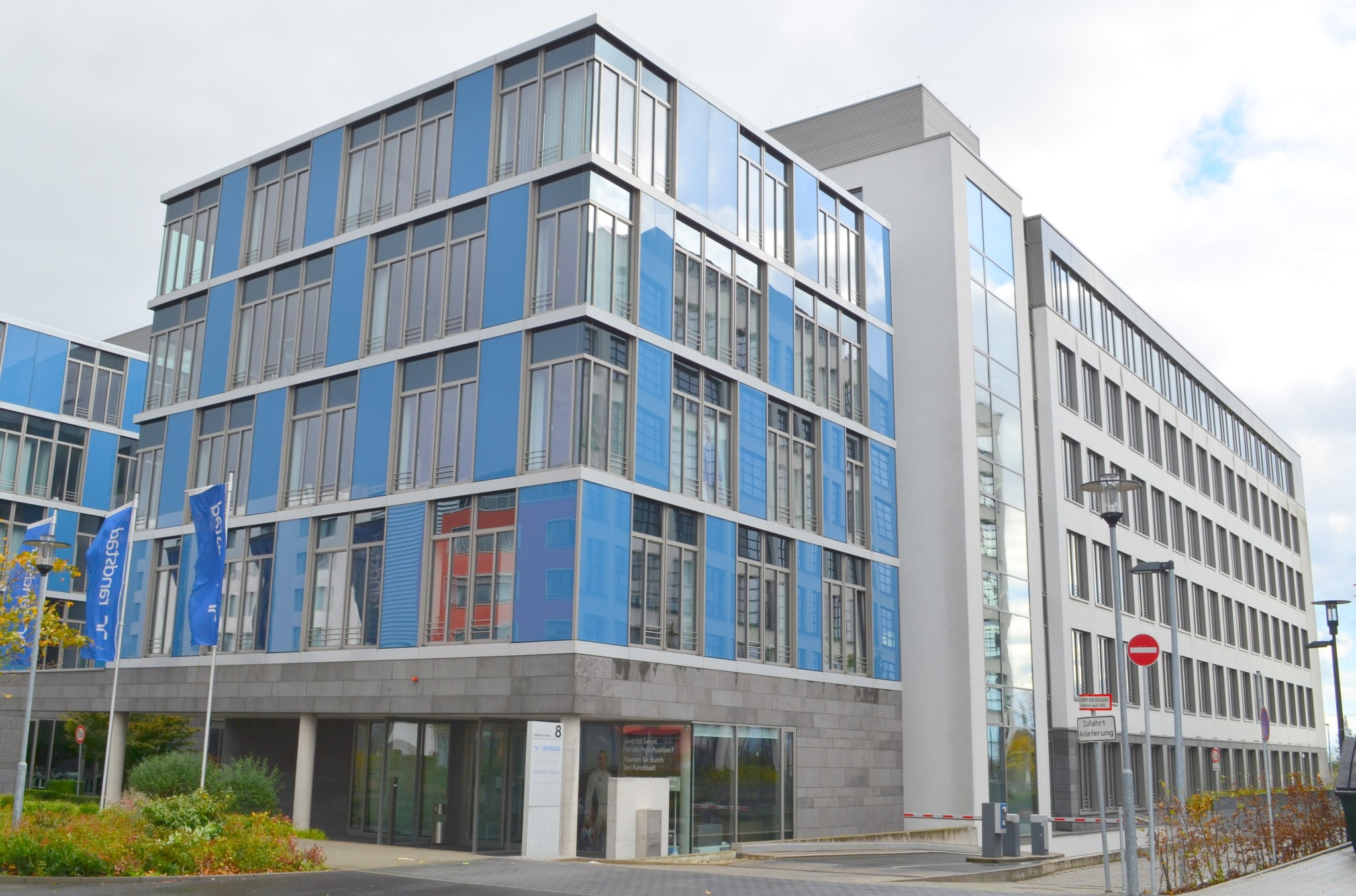
- Type: Naamloze vennootschap
- Traded as: Euronext Amsterdam: RAND; AEX component
- ISIN: NL0000379121
- Industry: Professional services
- Founded: 1960; 66 years ago
- Founder: Gerrit Daleboudt; Frits Goldschmeding
- Headquarters: Diemen, Netherlands
- Number of locations: 4,861 branches in 39 countries
- Area served: Global
- Key people: Sander van ‘t Noordende (Chairman and CEO)
- Services: Employment agencies, recruitments, human resource consulting and outsourcing
- Revenue: ▼€24.122 billion (2024)
- Operating income: ▼€405 million (2024)
- Net income: ▼€123 million (2024)
- Total assets: ▼€11.190 billion (2024)
- Total equity: ▼€4.133 billion (2024)
- Number of employees: 41,400 (corporate); 260,300 (2024)
- Website: randstad.com

Randstad NV, commonly known as Randstad and stylized as randstad, is a Dutch multinational human resource consulting firm headquartered in Diemen, Netherlands. Founded in 1960 by Frits Goldschmeding, it is the world's largest staffing and recruitment company by revenue. Headquartered in the Netherlands, Randstad operates in 39 markets and has approximately 38,000 employees. In 2025, this firm supported nearly 150,000 clients and over 1.7 million talent.

== History ==
The company was founded as Uitzendbureau Amstelveen in the Netherlands in 1960 by Gerrit Daleboudt and Frits Goldschmeding (1933-2024) based on an idea for a college thesis. The name was changed to Randstad four years later. Goldschmeding eventually became the richest person in the Netherlands.

Randstad Holding NV was created in 1978 — all divisions were then assembled under that umbrella. In 2008, the company sold its unit in Portugal to Kelly Services.

In March 2011, Frits Goldschmeding resigned as vice chairman of the Supervisory Board. His last term ran from 2007 to 2011.

== Four main specializations ==
Randstad support talent and clients through several primary brands and specialized business lines, categorized into Operational, Professional, Digital, and Enterprise solutions.

- Randstad Operational: Focuses on high-volume staffing in sectors such as manufacturing, logistics, and hospitality.
- Randstad Professional: Provides recruitment for middle and senior management roles across finance, engineering, healthcare, and human resources. This includes brands like Yacht (Netherlands) and Expectra (France).
- Randstad Digital: Launched in 2023, this global brand consolidates the company's IT, cloud, data, and engineering capabilities. It functions as a digital enablement partner, offering managed solutions, talent services, and global talent centers.
- Randstad Enterprise: This business line provides global talent lifecycle solutions for large-scale organizations. It integrates the services formerly known as Randstad Sourceright and Randstad RiseSmart:
  - Recruitment Process Outsourcing (RPO): Externalization of permanent recruitment functions.
  - Managed Services Programs (MSP): Management of contingent workforces and vendor neutral integrations.
  - Outplacement (via RiseSmart), and redeployment services.

== Acquisitions ==
In 2008, Randstad acquired Vedior for €3.3 billion and scaled up across Europe.

In September 2011, Randstad acquired Spherion for $770 million.

In August 2016, Randstad acquired Monster.com for $429 million in cash. In September 2024, Monster.com merged with CareerBuilder, and funds managed by Apollo Global Management became the majority owner of the websites, with Randstad retaining a minority investment.

In 2024, Randstad acquired Torc, an AI-powered talent marketplace, to enhance its digital engineering delivery.

== Sponsorships ==
Randstad was a sponsor of Formula One team Williams F1 from 2006 until 2017.

In 2019, Randstad became the sponsor of Italian Formula 1 team Scuderia Toro Rosso (known as Scuderia AlphaTauri from 2020-2024 and Racing Bulls since 2024).
