= S. M. Nasar =

Indian politician

Minister of Minorities Welfare, Non Resident Tamils Welfare, Refugees & Evacuees and Wakf Board. Government of Tamil Nadu
- In office 28 September 2024 – 5 May 2026
- Chief Minister: M. K. Stalin
- Preceded by: Gingee K. S. Masthan

Member of the Tamil Nadu Legislative Assembly
- In office 7 May 2021 – 5 May 2026
- Preceded by: K. Pandiarajan
- Constituency: Avadi

Personal details
- Party: Dravida Munnetra Kazhagam
- Spouse: Fathima Gani .R

S. M. Nasar is an Indian Politician and Former Minister of Minorities Welfare of Tamil Nadu, Member of Legislative Assembly of Tamil Nadu. He was elected from Avadi as a Dravida Munnetra Kazhagam candidate in 2021.

== Electoral performance ==
| Election | Party | Constituency Name | Result | Votes gained | Vote share% |
|---|---|---|---|---|---|
| 2021 | Dravida Munnetra Kazhagam | Avadi | Won | 150,287 | 50.35% |
| 2016 | Dravida Munnetra Kazhagam | Avadi | Lost | 106,669 | 39.40 |
