= Vedior =

Vedior N.V.
- Company type: Defunct
- Industry: Recruitment
- Founded: 1998; 28 years ago
- Defunct: June 2008; 18 years ago
- Fate: Acquired by Randstad NV
- Headquarters: Amsterdam, the Netherlands
- Key people: Jacques van den Broek (Chairman); Craig Johnson (Senior Editorial Director)
- Services: Employment agency
- Revenue: €7.660 billion (2006)
- Number of employees: 14,366

Vedior N.V. was an international employment agency based in Amsterdam, the Netherlands. Vedior operated in 50 countries in most of Europe, North and South America, Australia and New Zealand, South Africa, Middle East and Asia. In June 2008, the company was acquired by Randstad NV.

The company provided professional and executive personnel in IT, accounting, healthcare, engineering, legal, and education. It also provided HR-related services such as vendor management, outplacement, training and business process outsourcing. Vedior operated under many separate brands.

== History ==
Vedior was formed by a corporate spin-off from Vendex, following its acquisition of Bis.

In 1999, Vedior acquired Select Appointments, a UK-based staffing company with operations in the USA and Australia, for $1.83 billion, making it the fourth largest staffing company in the world.

Former Select CEO Tony Martin subsequently became the new CEO. Zach Miles replaced Martin as CEO in 2004, and oversaw more than 20 company acquisitions. Tex Gunning joined the company as Miles' replacement in September 2007 having previously been Group Vice President for South East Asia and Australasia at Unilever. Gunning left the firm after its acquisition by Randstad in 2008.

== Acquisition ==
In May 2008, Vedior was acquired by Randstad NV for around €3.5 billion to form the second-largest staffing agency worldwide, behind Adecco.
