= 1897 Kamudi Temple entry agitation =

The Kamudi Temple entry agitation was an agitation by the Nadar community to enter the Meenakshi Sundareswarar Temple in Kamudi or Kamuthi in 1897. On the night of 14 May 1897 the Nadars forcibly entered the temple and inside the Sanctum Sanctorum and made rituals. The Nadars were opposed as they were not considered as a high caste to enter the temple by the dominant Maravar community. Criminal cases were filed against the Nadars and they made to compensate for the purification rituals after their entry. The attempt to enter the temple represents an important step in the history of Kamudi.

Earlier In 1895, when Nadars struggled for their right to access the temples of Kamuthi, there were riots in Kalugumalai called Kalugumalai riots of 1895.

== Background ==
Earlier In 1895, when Nadars struggled for their right to access the temples of Kamuthi, there were riots in Kazhugumalai called Kazhugumalai riots. The Kamudi taluk villages are governed by the people of the Marava community. But the Nadar community is dominant in Kamudi town. Each community has a completely separate temple in Kamudi for worship. Founded by Sundara Pandya, a Pandya king, the Kamudi Meenakshi Sundareswarar Temple was ruled by the Raja of Ramanathapuram. The Nadars of Ramnad District made another attempt to secure their rights to enter and worship. Their rights were asserted on the grounds that they were Kshatriyas. But the assertion was opposed by Baskara Sethupathy, the Raja of Ramnad and the traditional trustee of the Temple and the Maravars.

In November 1895, the Nadars of kamuthi petitioned the Meenakshi Sundaraswara temple, which was under Ramnad M. Baskara Sethupathi's trusteeship of the Raj, for permission to hold a ritual feast. Their petition was accepted, with the condition that the feast should be performed without the entry of Nadars into the temple. An anti-Nadar coalition was created by Vellasami Thevar, the inherited ruler of a vast land under the Raja of Ramnad and the grandfather of the late Muthuramalinga Thevar. He made a confederacy of castes form the surrounding villages to not buy things for the Nadars. He prohibited the Nadars from asserting their freedom. He ordered the allegiance of the society of Maravar and insisted a distinction between all castes.

== Temple entry ==
On the night of 14 May 1897, despite the forceful opposition by the temple servants, a party of fifteen Nadars from the Irulappa Nadar family forcefully managed to enter the Meenakshi Sundareswarar Temple at Kumudi with Kavadi, torches and drums. They went to the Sanctum Sanctorum and approached the principal deity re-lighted the extinguished torches and presented coconuts, swung before it, lighted camphor, and offered poojas to the main deity. Finally, the holy image was touched by them. But the Maravars and the Ramnad Zamindar opposed it.

== Cases ==
A criminal case was filed against fifteen Nadars for the disgracing of the temple and ordered the compensation of Rs. 2500 for purification rituals backed by 75 witness accounts of all castes and a collection of evidence from the caste history of Nadars as the Nadars tried to establish their privileges as a high caste to access the temple and also to partake in the pooja and worship conducted in the very same way and except the Brahmin.

== Court judgments ==
On 20 July 1899, a permanent order was issued by the sub-judge of Madurai East to prohibit the Nadars from entering the temple indefinitely in the future. An extra police force was deployed at Kamudi at the expense of the residents for a period of 5 years from 5 November 1900, in order to prevent any conflict between the Nadars and the Marvars.

Dissatisfied with the district court's decision in Madurai, the Nadars made an appeal to the Madras High Court. Under the guidance of Rathnaswami Nadar, a prominent Abkari contractor of Tanjore, the Nadars, in the meantime, tried to find an agreement with the Raja of Ramnad. As per the agreement, the Nadars agreed to pay nearly 7000/- rupees to allow the Nadars to access and worship at the temple of Kamudi. But the British who wanted to maintain a status quo, did not like these developments and communicated with the Raja and caused the Nadars to withdraw the agreement because the British wanted to secure their status, and they didn't want to engage in the Hindu temples' caste-based worship system. The Raja himself recognized the severe nature of the issue and accepted that the agreement be removed.

But the Madras High Court upheld the lower court's decision. When the Madras high court decision went against the Nadars, the Nadars collected an amount of Rs 42,000 and brought their case to the Privy Council London, which was the largest appeal body in the British Empire. In 1908, the Privy Council upheld the judgment of the High Court. The Privy Council argued that the status of the Nadars seemed to be only above the Pallars and Paraiyar, who were barred from Hindu temples to pray. Around the same time, the Privy Council acknowledged the right to pray in the Hindu temples of the Vellalars and other castes. The Nadars expected a favorable decision, but in vain, from the European officials. The relationship between the Nadars and the Maravars deteriorated with the Kamudi temple entry and the judgment by the Privy Council of London.
