= L. A. Cammiade =

Louis Aime Francois Cammiade
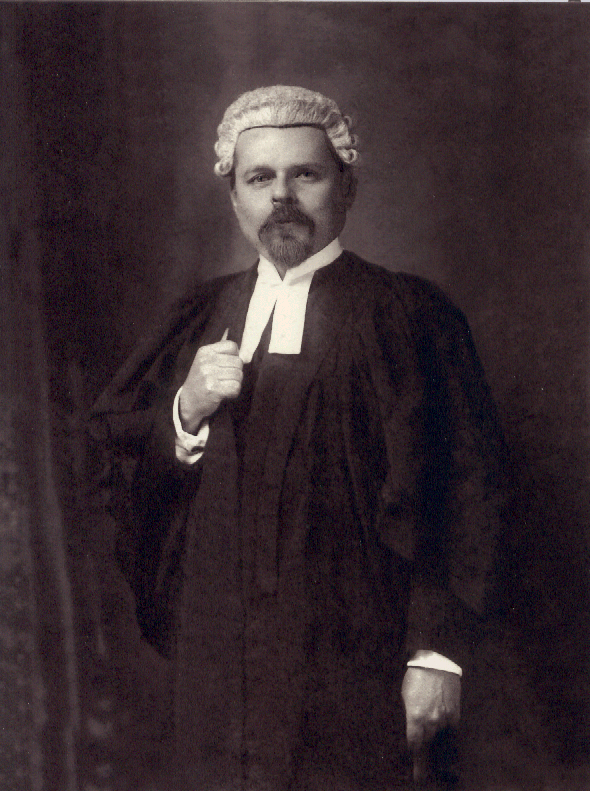
- Born: 2 June 1872; Madras, India
- Died: 3 November 1951 (aged 79)
- Education: Middle Temple
- Occupations: civil servant, magistrate
- Children: 6

Louis Aime Francois Cammiade (2 June 1872 – 3 November 1951) was a magistrate and officer of the Indian Civil Service who conducted archaeological excavations on the prehistoric strata of Chennai in the early part of the 20th century.

== Early life and education ==
Born in Madras on 2 June 1872 to merchant Gilbert Henry Cammiade, Cammiade graduated in 1892 and graduated in law from the Middle Temple on 19 November 1901. In 1895, he joined the provincial civil service as a clerk in the Chief Secretariat, Madras Presidency. In 1897, Cammiade was promoted as Deputy Tahsildar.

== Civil service ==
In 1903, Cammiade was promoted as Deputy Collector of Tinnevely district. From January to June 1909, he served as Settlement Officer of Polavaram division. Cammiade served as a second class magistrate during this period and was called to the bar on 17 November 1910. In 1917, Cammiade was made Presidency Magistrate of Madras.

== Archaeological excavations ==
Cammiade was also an amateur archaeologist and is credited with many path-breaking discoveries in unearthing the Stone Age of South India. While serving as Deputy Collector of Tinnevely, Cammiade excavated prehistoric remains at Kalugumalai. While serving as District Collector of Kurnool, Cammiade explored the Billa Surgam caves in the district. In 1922, Cammiade revealed the discovery of a prehistoric cemetery in Kilpauk, Madras city. Cammiade is also credited with one of the earliest discoveries of a Tamil-Brahmi inscriptions at Marungaltalai in Tinnevely district in 1906-07.

== Personal life ==
Cammiade married firstly Alice Eleanor Cardozo (1887 - 1920). They had five children, three surviving to adulthood. Secondly he married Elsie Lilian Cardozo (1891-1970). The two had six children all surviving to adulthood. Cammiade died on 3 November 1951 and was buried at St. Wilfred's Roman Catholic cemetery.
