= Kalugasalamoorthy temple =

Kalugasalamoorthy Temple
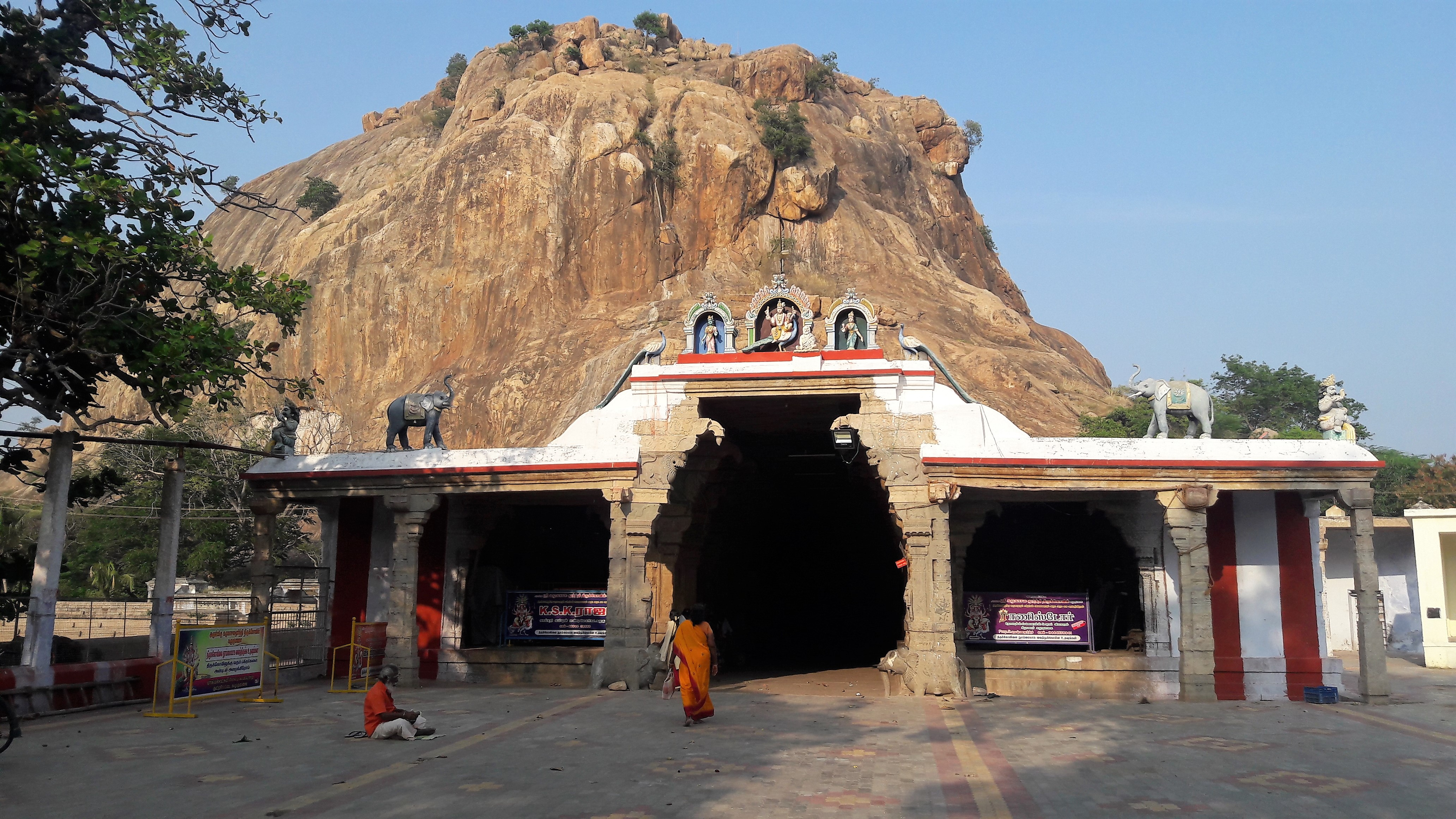

- Location in Tamil Nadu

Religion
- Affiliation: Hinduism
- District: Thoothukudi
- Deity: Kalugasalamoorthy (Murugan)

Location
- Location: Kalugumalai
- State: Tamil Nadu
- Country: India
- Coordinates: 9°08′58″N 77°42′11″E

Architecture
- Type: Dravidian architecture, Rock cut

Website
- kalugumalaitemple.tnhrce.in

Kalugasalamoorthy Temple (or Kalugumalai Murugan temple) in Kalugumalai, a panchayat town in Kovilpatti taluk, Thoothukudi district in the South Indian state of Tamil Nadu, is dedicated to the Hindu god Murugan. Constructed in the Dravidian style of architecture, the temple is believed to have been expanded during the 18th century with the images excavated from Kalugumalai. The core temple has a rock-cut architecture exemplary of early Pandyan Art. The other portions of Kalugumalai houses the 8th century Kalugumalai Jain Beds and Vettuvan Koil, an unfinished Shiva temple.

The temple has a gateway leading to a pillared hall and the sanctum. The temple is open from 5:30 am – 12:30 pm and 4:30 - 9 pm. Four daily rituals and many yearly festivals are held at the temple, of which the ten-day Vaikasi Visagam, 13-day Kanthasasti festival, ten-day Thaipoosam festival and the 13-day Panguni Uthiram festival being the most prominent. The temple is maintained and administered by the Hindu Religious and Endowment Board of the Government of Tamil Nadu.

== Legend ==
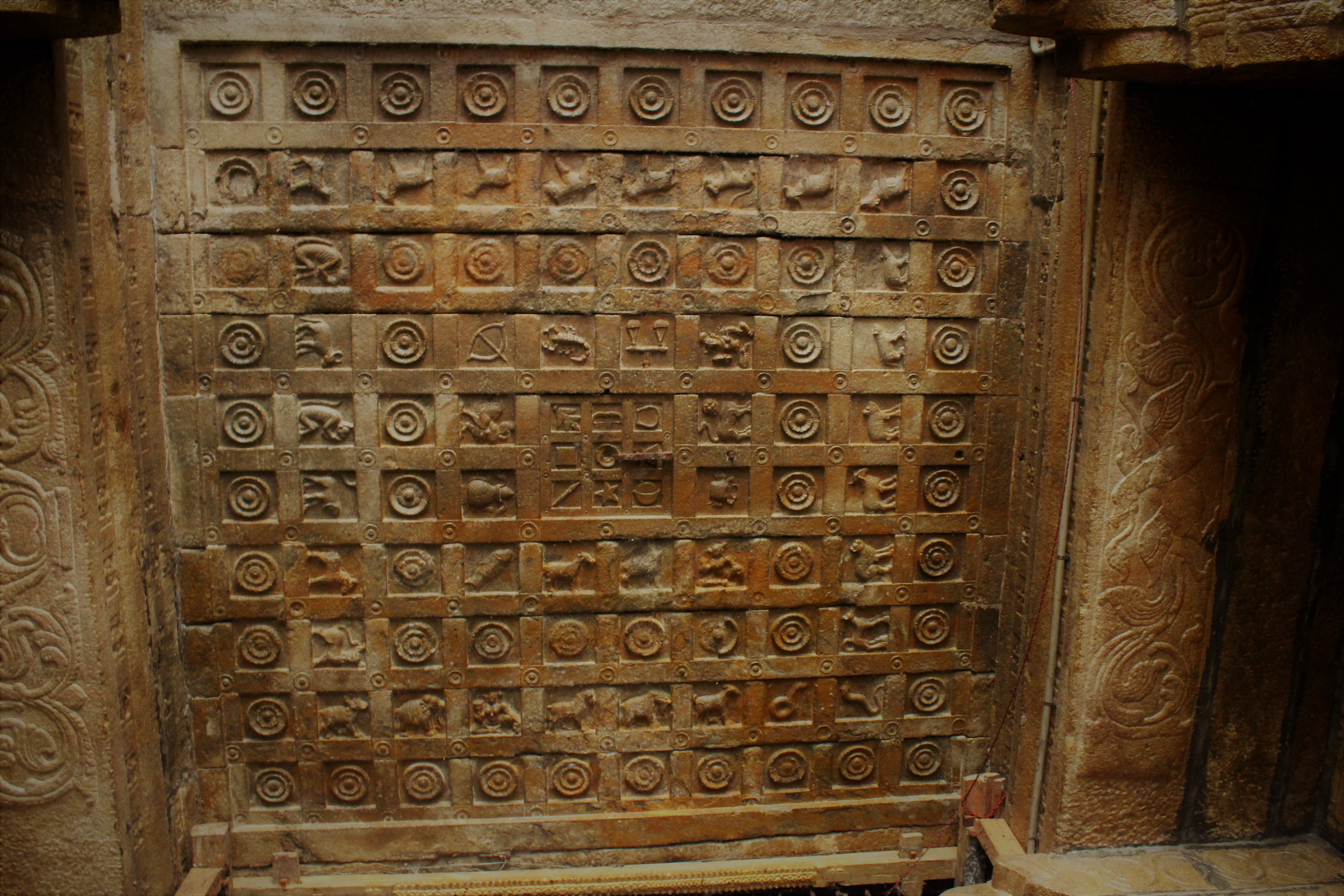
Sculpture on the ceiling of the temple

As per regional tradition, the temple is associated with the Ramayana. Ravana, the demon king, killed Jatayu the eagle as he attempted to prevent the abduction of Sita, the consort of Rama. Rama performed the final rites for Jatayu, who informed Rama about the abduction before he died. Jatayu's brother Sampati, also called Kalugumahamunivar in local tradition, was worried about the repercussions of not performing the final rites for his brother. Rama advised him to perform penance at Gajamukaparvatham and taking a holy dip in the tank. Ages passed by, and in the same region, Murugan pursued Surapadman, another demon. Tarukasuran, the brother of Surapadman, was troubling the sages in the region. Murugan slew Tarukasuran and was resting at Kalugumalai. Sampati assisted Murugan and also indicated the hideout of Surapadman, whom Murugan slew subsequently. Pleased with his devotion, Murugan offered him salvation. The place came to be known as Kalugumalai since the sage Kalugumahamunivar resided here.

== Architecture ==
The temple is located in Kalugumalai, a rockyhill in near Kovilpatti, Thoothukudi district in southern Tamil Nadu. The sanctum of the temple is approached through a pillared hall near the gateway. The temple tank is located outside the temple. The sanctum is built in a rock-cut cave, which houses the image of Murugan in the form of Kazhugachalamurthi in seated posture. The sanctum faces West and the image of the presiding deity is 4 ft (1.2 m) tall. The image is sported with six hands with one of them holding Vel (divine spear), his left leg over the shoulder of the peacock and right is left hanging. There are separate shrines of his consorts Valli facing South and Deivanai facing North. There is a separate shrine for Shiva and Parvathi and all the Parsvatah Devatas (attendant deities) associated with Shiva temples. Usually in Murugan temples, his vehicle peacock would be heading towards his right, but it is sported on to the left of Murugan in this temple. It is believed that Indra, the king of celestial deities, appeared as peacock to worship Murugan. The image of the peacock is hence covered during the festivals. The other portions of Kalugumalai houses the 8th century Kalugumalai Jain Beds and Vettuvan Koil, an unfinished Shiva temple.

== History and religious significance ==
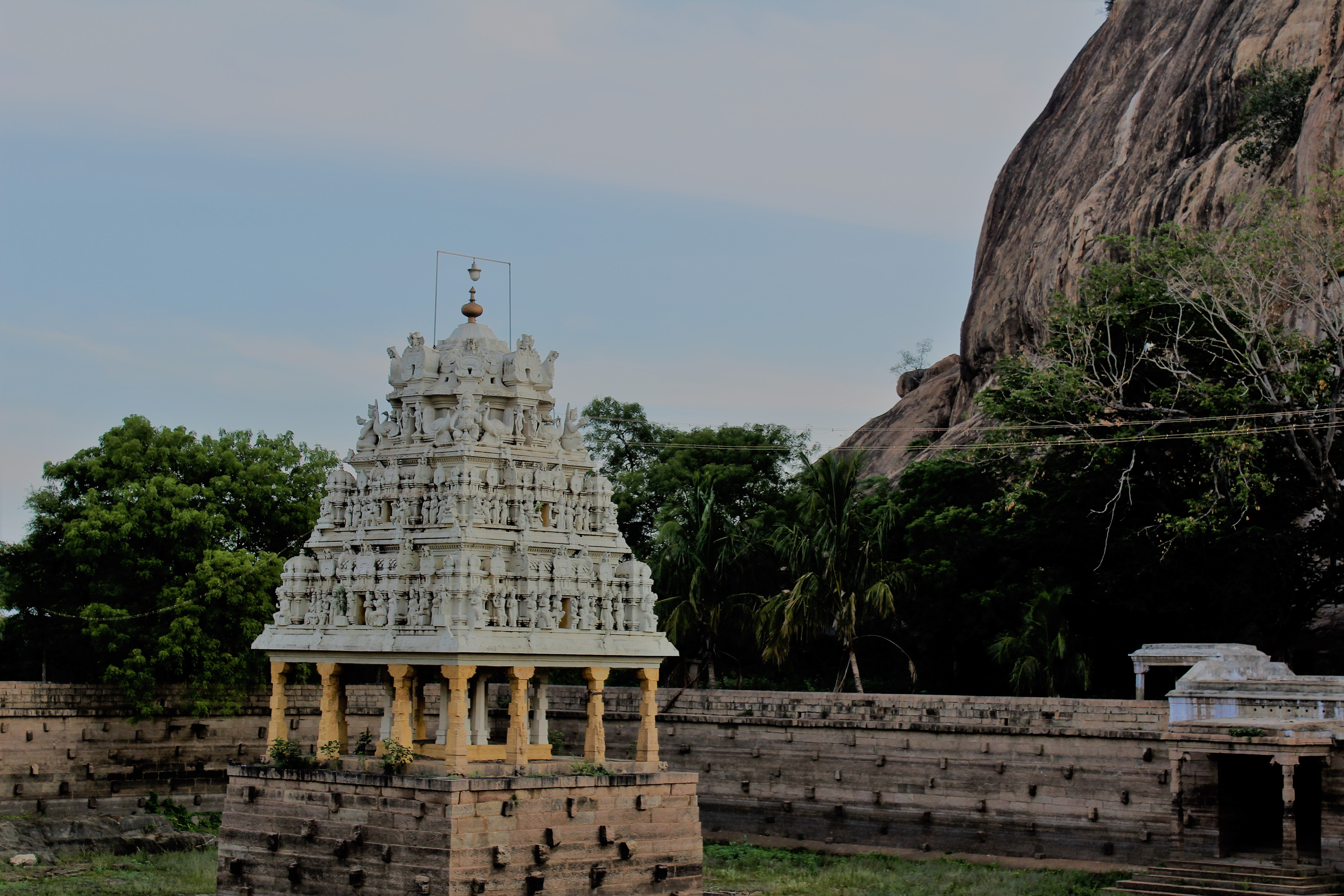
Image of the temple tank

The images of the presiding deity was excavated from the Southwestern corner of Kalugumalai. The images were installed and the leading pillared halls were constructed during the 18th century. The temple finds mention in Kanthapuranam, a work by Kachiappar. Kachiappar mentions that there are only three sacred temples of Murugan where he faces the South and this is the only temple where he faces south and also in seated posture. The temple was under the control of Ettaiyapuram Zamindar under 1954. The Raja gifted the village to the temple and formed five streets around the temple to enable the temple car to pass easily. He also allocated a middle street for the temple priests. During the Panguni Uthiram festival procession, the elongated conflict between two castes in the region, namely, Nadars and Maravars resulted in a riots, popularly called Kalugumalai riots of 1895. A total of ten people were killed, many injured and the temple car and other property in the region were destroyed. In modern times, the temple is maintained and administered by the Hindu Religious and Endowment Board of the Government of Tamil Nadu.

== Festival ==
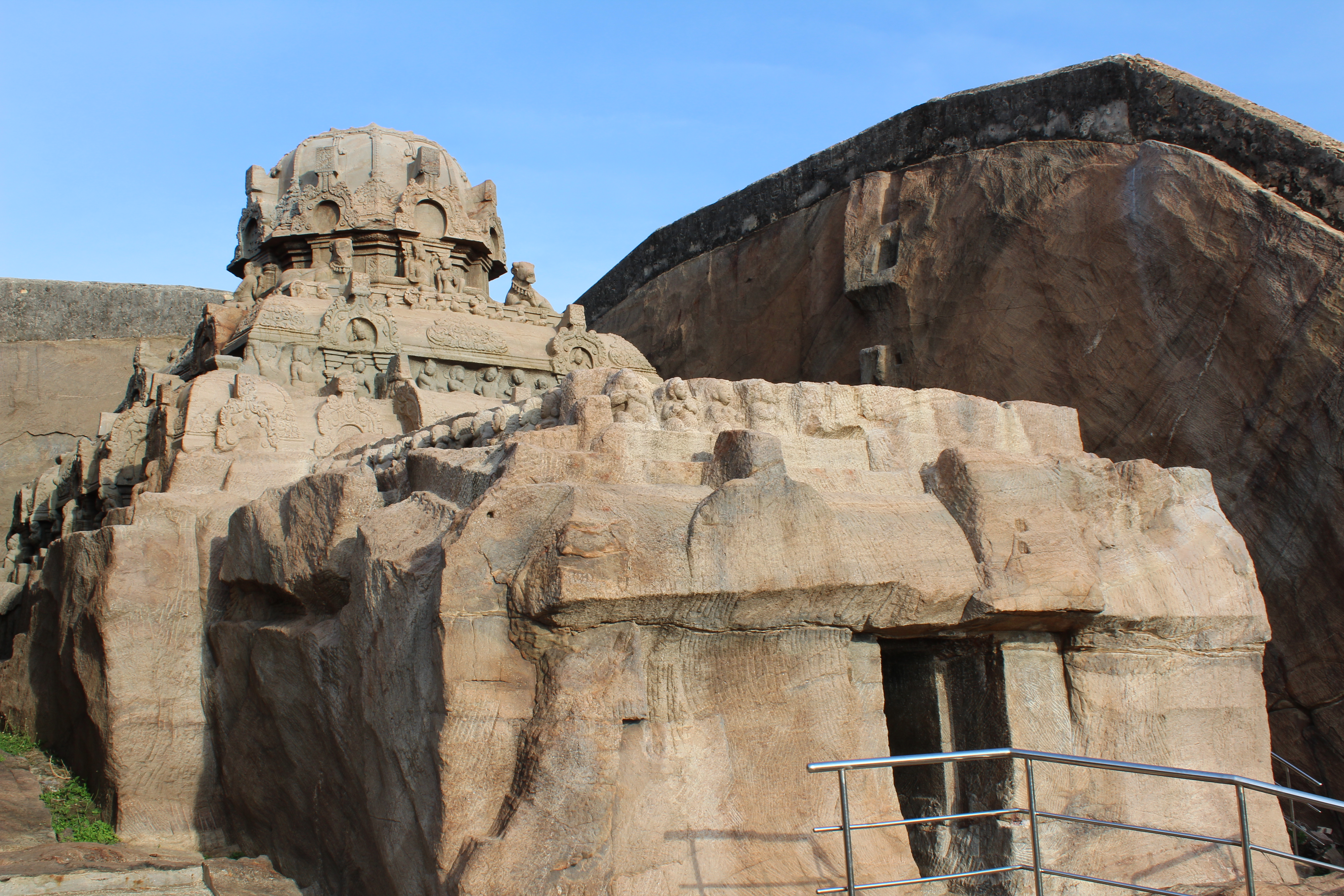
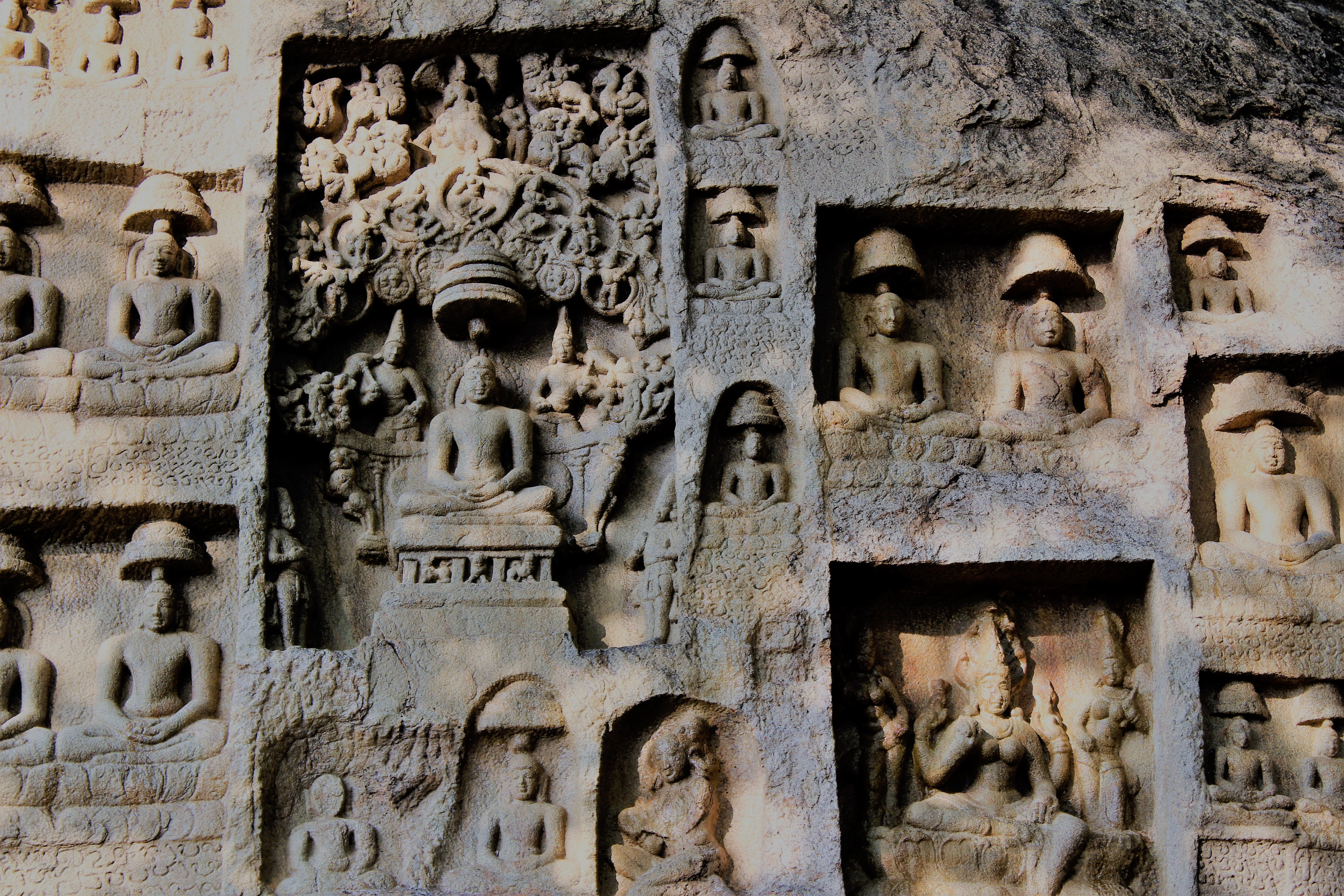
Vettuvan Kovil and Kalugumalai Jain Beds, both located in Kalugumalai, in the same hill

The temple priests perform the pooja (rituals) during festivals and on a daily basis. There are weekly, monthly and fortnightly rituals performed in the temple. The temple is open from 5:30 am – 12:30 pm and 6 - 9 pm on all days except during festive occasions when it has extended timings. The major festivals of the temple include the ten-day Vaikasi Visagam celebrated during the Tamil month of Vaikasi (May - June), 13 day Kanthasasti festival, Ten day Thaipoosam festival celebrated during the Tamil month of Thai (January - February) and the 13 day Panguni Uthiram festival during Panguni (March - April). Kalugumalai was chosen in the plan to be included as a rural tourism site in Incredible India campaign by the Tourism Ministry of the Government of India. As a part of the campaign the ministry allocated ₹10 million to develop the infrastructure around the region in 2008. The tourist inflow to the town increased to 3,000 persons per month during 2009 from 400 per month during the previous years.

== Gallery ==
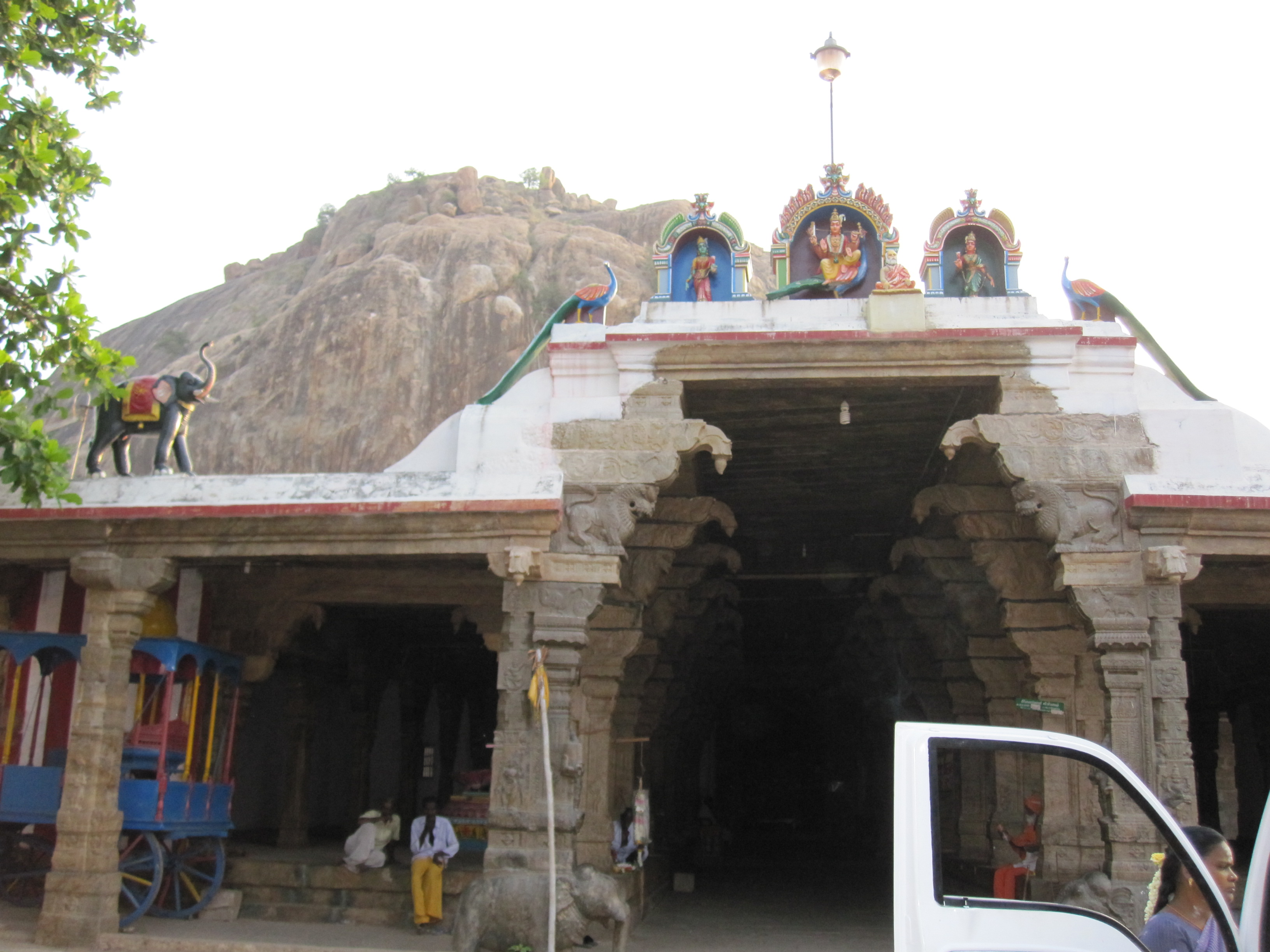

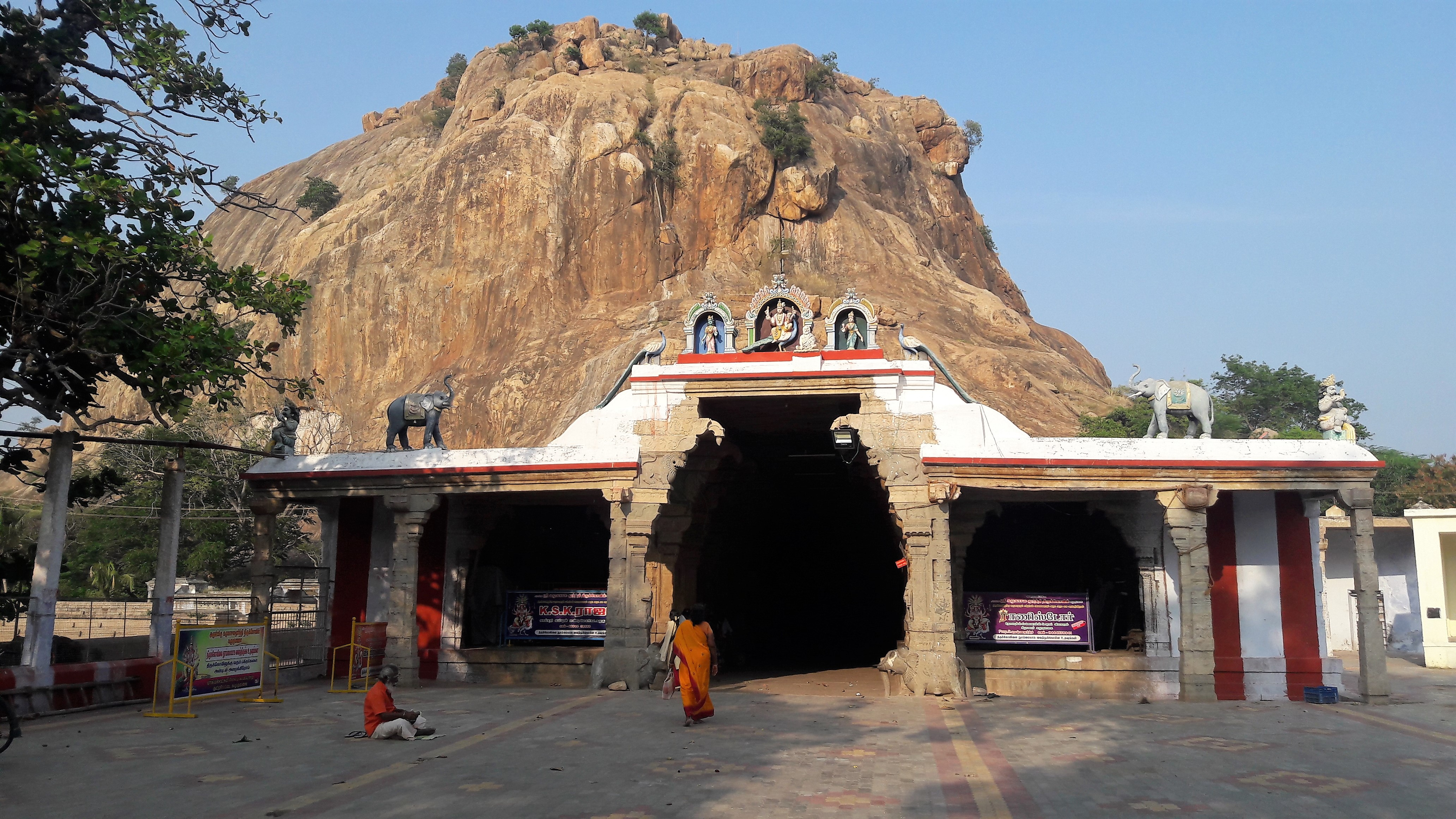
