= Kalugumalai riots of 1895 =

- Part of Shanar - Maravar conflicts
- Location: Kalugumalai, Madras Presidency, British India
- Date: 1895 (UTC+5:30)
- Attack type: Riot
- Deaths: at least 10
- Perpetrators: Inter caste, Christian-Hindu

Kalugumalai riots of 1895 (commonly referred as Kalugumalai riots) was a violent conflict between Nadars (also called Shanars) who had recently converted to Roman Catholicism and Maravars who were a traditional Tamil military caste during 1895 in Kalugumalai in Madras Presidency, British India. A total of ten people were killed and numerous people were injured. The temple chariot of Kalugasalamoorthy Temple was also burnt during the riots. The contention of the communities were over the usage of the Car streets round the temple by Nadars, which were opposed by the other communities quoting private ownership and religious sanctity.

There was an prolonged court battle between the Nadars and the Ettaiyapuram Zamindar. The Raja Ettaiyapuram had created the streets starting in 1849, allotted house lots on the newly built streets, with shrines to Hindu deities along the cardinally aligned car streets to the temple for festival processions. Ettaiyapuram argued before the court that the streets were built for the temple and were temple property. The Nadars argued that the streets were public property. All the appeals of the Nadar seeking public ownership of the streets were rejected by the courts, on the basis that the temple streets were a religious issue. In November 1894, the French missionary Caussanel purchased a house site on the temple's East Car street, and began the construction of a Christian chapel. This triggered a Hindu protest. In 1895, Caussanel and Nadars set up a ceremonial porch (pandal) for a baptism ceremony on the same Car street that impeded the temple procession car. This, in combination with the Nadars’ rise as a business community and social status lead to a violent confrontation between the Maravars and Nadars in 1895. This is historically remembered as the Kalugumalai riots of 1895. The details and motivations behind the riots have rival narratives, states Anthony Good – an Anthropologist and Indologist, with the colonial era Christian narratives focusing on the caste system, while the Hindu narrative focusing on the missionary activity within the temple property and repeated blocking of their temple's procession cart in front of the Church commissioned by Caussanel.

The Sessions Court convicted two Nadars, named Mahalinga and Karutna and sentenced them to death on 17 August 1895, while others received 3 to 6 months. The appeal in the High Court was made by Caussanel, the French missionary, immediately in favour of the Nadars and he argued that the evidences were not properly examined by the Sessions court. The High Court overruled the verdict of the lower court and set all of the accused free. The Sivakasi riots of 1899 is considered as an aftermath to this riots. In 1897, a court ordered the Church to leave the Hindu temple street site. After exhausting all court appeals, in 1904 the Christian missionaries led by Caussanel agreed to remove the chapel and Christian activity from East Car street and relocate to a new site in Kalugumalai.

== Background ==
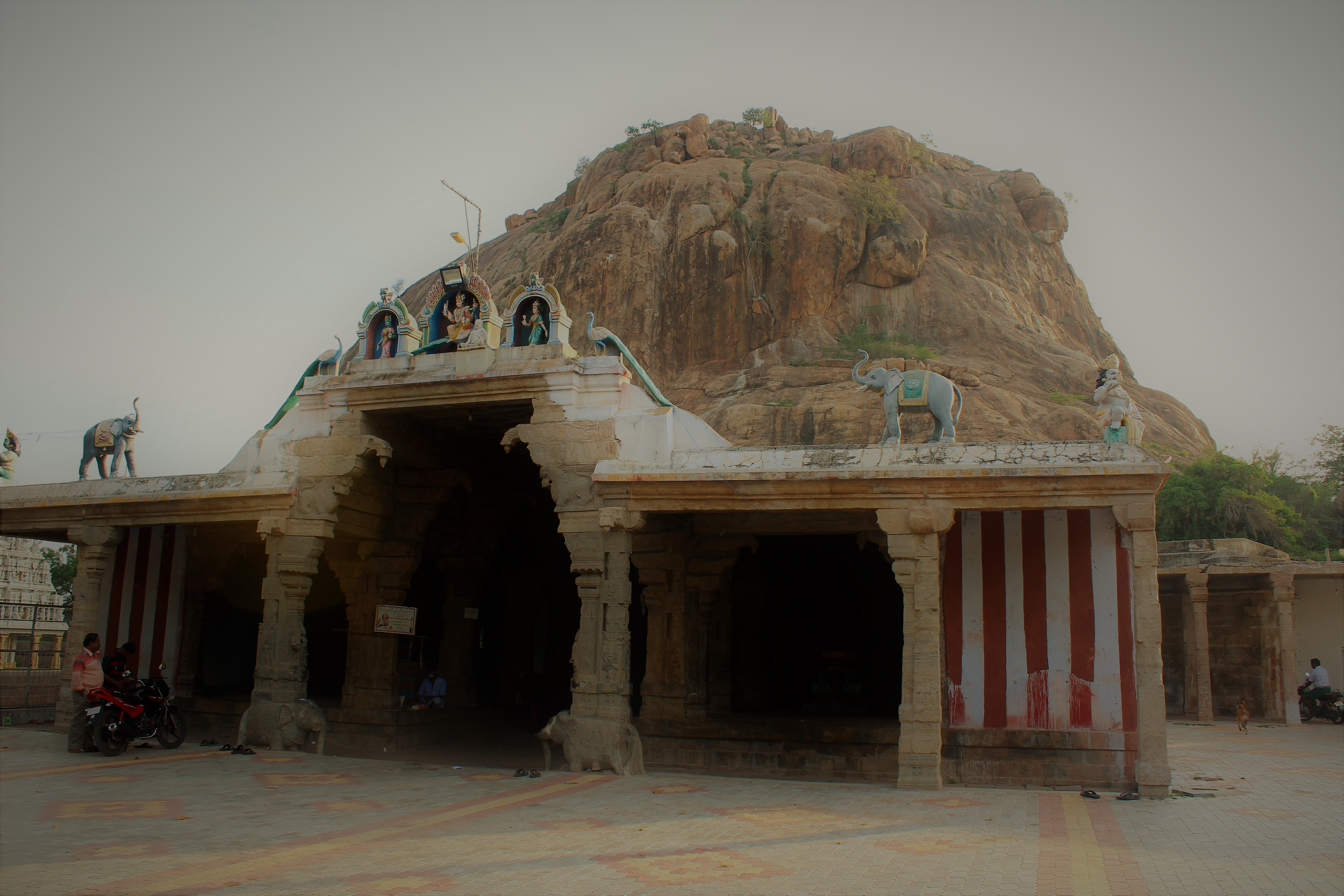
The Murugan cave temple in Kalugumalai (Kazhugachalamurthi temple), expanded in the 18th and chariot car streets added in the 19th-century.

Kalugumalai was a village in Tinnevelly district in Madras Presidency in British India before India's independence in 1947. In modern times, the village is part of Thoothukudi district in the state of Tamil Nadu. The place has a granite hill known for three historic landmarks, namely Vettuvan Koil, Kalugumalai Jain Beds and Kalugasalamoorthy Temple. The former two were commissioned during the rule of Pandya in the 8th century and Parantaka Nedunjadaiya (768-800 CE) respectively. Kalugasalamoorthy Temple is a cave temple, whose halls were expanded during the 18th century. The images of the presiding deity was excavated from the Southwestern corner of Kalugumalai. The images were installed and the leading pillared halls were constructed during the 18th century.

Kalugumalai along with its temples and historic monuments was under the control of Ettaiyapuram Zamindar until 1954, once one of the largest estates and colonial era "little kingdom" recognized by the Madras Presidency of British India. Ettaiyapuram Raja gifted the village to the Kalugasalamoorthy Temple in 1849. He also built five streets aligned to traditional cardinal directions around the temple to enable the temple procession chariot to pass easily during Hindu festivals. The streets featured a mandala of Hindu architecture, featuring shrines of Brahma, Varuna, Vayu, Kubera, Isana, Indra, Agni, Yama and Nirutti at the Car street intersections. He granted house sites on these streets to temple workers, with the middle street for the temple priests. Some castes such as Maravars had a persistent history of discriminating against the Nadars – the traditional toddy tappers (alcohol from palm), and had objected to them carrying their wedding processions to the local temple over the newly built temple streets. In early 1890s, the Nadars had newly converted to Roman Catholicism and their rivalry with the Maravars who were traditional Hindus intensified.

As per official account, the village had a population of 3,800 in 1890 with 500 Nadars and 475 Maravars. As in the case with villages in South India, people resided in specific streets based on their castes. The Nadars resided in streets in the north-east, which were outside the car streets but within the longer route of temple procession round the hill.

== Caste politics ==
During the 1800s, Nadars, then aspiring business community, established Kalugumalai as one of their commercial base. The Shanars, on account of their superior liquidity, wanted their social status to be on par with other communities. They changed Shanars to Nadar, meaning the ruling community. The Jesuits of Madurai were effecting religious conversions in the region. Nadars converted in large numbers to attain upward mobility, which was otherwise denied by the Hindu community. It was estimated that as many as 150,000 Nadars out of a total of 410,000 converted to Christianity by 1890. The district administration noted that the district had the risk of caste clash tensions with the Nadars seeking upward social mobility, but continuously being denied by Vellalars and the Maravars. The Nadars were denied entry to temples dominated by other caste Hindus. Some historians also believe that Nadars were successful in cotton trade in the region where other communities could not compete.

By the end of the 19th century, the Nadars’ rapid rise as a business community and the mutual confrontation between the Maravars and Nadars reached its peak in 1895, leading to a series of riots. During the Panguni Uthiram festival procession, the elongated conflict between two castes in the region, namely, Nadars and Maravars resulted in a riots, popularly called Kalugumalai riots.

== Legal proceedings ==
During 1851, the Nadars tried to conduct a marriage procession in one of the four car streets, which was blocked by other castes. The Zamindar ruled that the Nadars can go up to the Pillaiyar temple in East Giri Street. There was another attempt made by the Nadars in 1866 when he District Collector negotiated a compromise by allowing Nadars to go in palanquins up to the Pillayar temple. There were further attempts in 1885, when the Zamindar sought legal action. He argued that the streets belonged to the temple and the temple reserved the right to allow religious processions to maintain the purity of the streets. The Nadars contended that the streets were public places where everyone had equal rights. The witnesses claimed that the Nadar procession never went beyond the north eastern altar in the past. There was also a contention about a Nadar owning a shop in one of the streets. During 1899, the Munisif ruled that the streets belonged to the temple. The case was taken to an appeal judge by the Nadars. By around this time, the Zamindar died and his juvenile heir was helped by his manager. The appeal judge ruled that the trader, Kalimuthu, who was having a house in East Car Street, recognised the rights of the temple and hence discharged the appeal. With further appeal, the Chief Justice ruled on 7 August 1899 that the temple had not dedicated the streets as public. With all legal proceedings going against them, the Nadars resorted to religious conversions to Catholics.

== The riots ==
A French missionary by name Caussanel bought the same house in the East Car Street and started building a Church in the locality. When the foundation was laid, there were clashes where some Nadars were set ablaze. After official intervention, the church was built, but a protruding facade (called pandal) believed to have impeded the path of the temple car. On 7 April 1895, during the Panguni Uthiram festival of the temple, the temple chariot was drawn around the streets of Kalugumalai and it reached the East Car Street where the Pandal was protruding from the church. The Estate manager tried to convince the Nadars to remove the Pandal. As per some accounts, there was enough space for the chariot to move, but the other caste communities demanded the removal. It is unclear on who started the clash, but the Estate manager was stabbed to death along with the Munisif of Duraisaipuram village, who sustained injuries and died after a while. The caste Hindu Maravars set the church roof on fire and attacked the Nadar households. The houses and business establishments were burnt and women, children were also attacked. The press reports claimed 27 Nadars were killed, but the official numbers quoted only 20. A total of 24 people were killed, more than 100 people injured and the temple car and other property in the region were destroyed.

== Trial ==
Many Nadars were arrested after the riots, but the timing of the arrests were debated. The rivals provided contrasting accounts of the events to the Munisif court, while Caussenel gave a hand-written note to the Sub-Magistrate stating that the opposing Hindu started pelting stones to initiate the events and set fire to the church. The wounded manager gave an evidence before death that he was stabbed by a Nadar. There were a total of 34 Nadars who were arrested in connection with the case. The Session Court heard both the sides' argument and ruled that Mahalinga and Karutna belonging to the Nadar side were sentenced to death on 17 August 1895, while others received 3 to 6 months. The appeal in the High Court was made by Caussanel immediately and he argued that the evidences were not properly examined by the Sessions court. The High Court overruled the verdict of the lower court and set all of the accused free. Causannel was welcomed by the Nadars from the region and he was taken in procession through Srivilliputhur and Sivakasi.

== Aftermath ==
The caste fights continued in the region between Nadars and Maravars and eventually there was another riot in Sivakasi, the Sivakasi riots of 1899. The most common references to the riots are from the British official accounts. The works of Hardgrave (1969) and Susan Bayly (1989) are the most commonly referred edicts, but have been criticized for the amount of on-field work carried out. Most of the work are from published accounts and testimonies of inhabitants in the modern times. Religious prejudices favouring the Shanars who converted to Christianity is also a common accusation questioning the neutrality of the studies.
