= Kalugumalai =

- town
- Location in Tamil Nadu, India
- Coordinates: 9.15°N 77.72°E
- Country: India
- State: Tamil Nadu
- District: Thoothukudi
- Elevation: 105 m (344 ft)

Population (2001)
  - Total: 14,834

Languages
  - Official: Tamil
- Time zone: UTC+5:30 (IST)
- PIN: 628552

Kalugumalai is a panchayat town in Kovilpatti Taluk of Thoothukudi district in the Indian state of Tamil Nadu. Kalugumalai is 21 km and 22 km from Kovilpatti and Sankarankovil respectively. The place houses the rockcut Kalugasalamoorthy Temple, monolithic Vettuvan Koil and Kalugumalai Jain Beds.

== Geography ==
Kalugumalai is located at 9.152962, 77.704386. It has an average elevation of 105 metres (344 feet). It is strategically located in between Kovilpatti (20 km from Kalugumalai) and Sankarankoil (19 km from Kalugumalai) and served as ancient trade route from Kovilpatti to Courtallam and Sengottai.

== History ==
Kalugumalai is Tamil for "hill of the vulture". It was previously known as Araimalai or Tirumalai, as well as Nechchuram and Tiruneccuram. Some of the epigraphies in the site mention a palace for the Pandya official called Ettimannan. At the foot of the Kalugumalai, a large urn-burial cemetery was found. However, hundreds of urns were destroyed during limestone quarrying. Opposite to Kalugasalamoorthy Temple is a small palace that served as local residence of Raja of Ettaiyapuram.

The place was the scene of Kalugumalai riots of 1895, when ten people were killed in caste clashes.

== Demographics ==
As of 2001 India census, Kalugumalai had a population of 14,834. Males constitute 49% of the population and females 51%. Kalugumalai has an average literacy rate of 70%, higher than the national average of 59.5%: male literacy is 78%, and female literacy is 63%. In Kalugumalai, 9% of the population is under 6 years of age.

== Landmarks ==
There are three Temples in Kalugumalai and a Church.

=== Kalugumalai Jain Beds ===
The Kalugumalai Jain Beds are many rock relief sculptures dating to the 8th-9th century CE in the area, including the rock cut image of the tirthankara Parshvanatha flanked by two yakshas, as well as many other rock cut images of other tirthankaras.

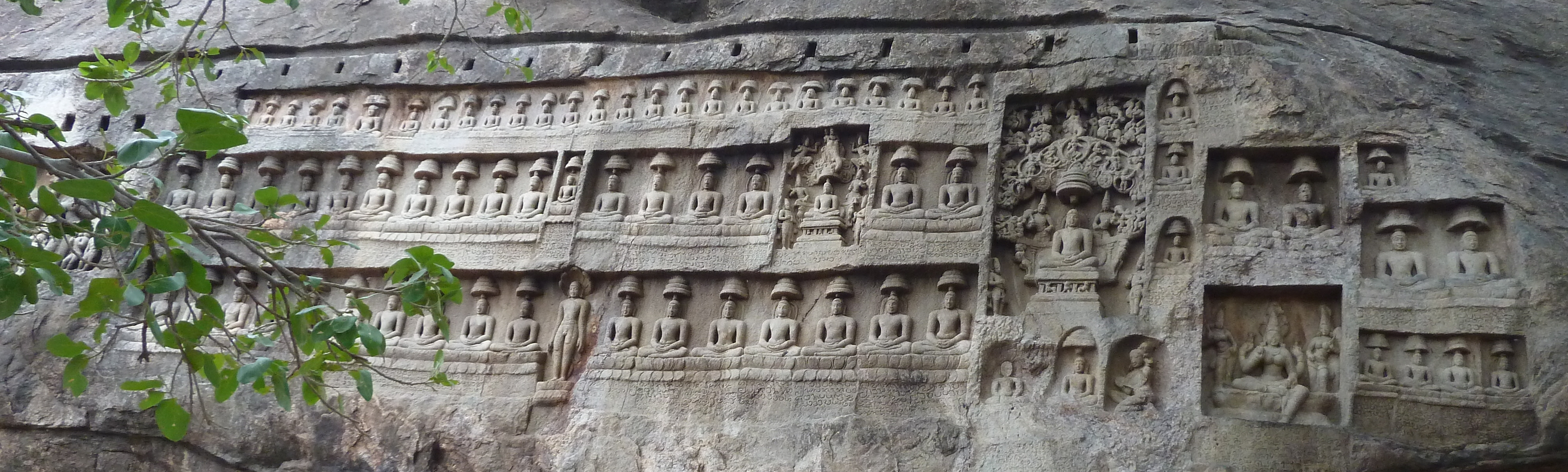
A portion of Jain rock cut images

The area is known for the Jain cave temple and architecture. There are a number of Jain images with labels in the vatteluttu script. The epigraphs mentions the name of the donors of the figures, of the provisions made for the offerings, etc. The main deity of the hill was called Araimalai Alvar. The other figures were caused to be made by the followers of Jain faith from a number of villages nearby. The sculptures were caused to be made in memory of the departed souls. There are approximately one hundred and fifty relief sculptures. Among the donors were the carpenters, potters, smiths, cultivators and other workers. A number of others were high ranking persons bearing the titles of Enadi, Etti, and Kavidi. Provisions are also recorded for expounding Jain Siddhanta. An ascetic named Gunasagara Bhattar is recorded to hsvdylived here. The sculptures and the epigraphs are to be assigned to the reign of Pandya, Parantaka Nedunjadaiya (CE 768–800). From different epigraphies it is found that they belong to different era and the place became extinct after the 13th century due to loss of patronage after the Pandya kings.

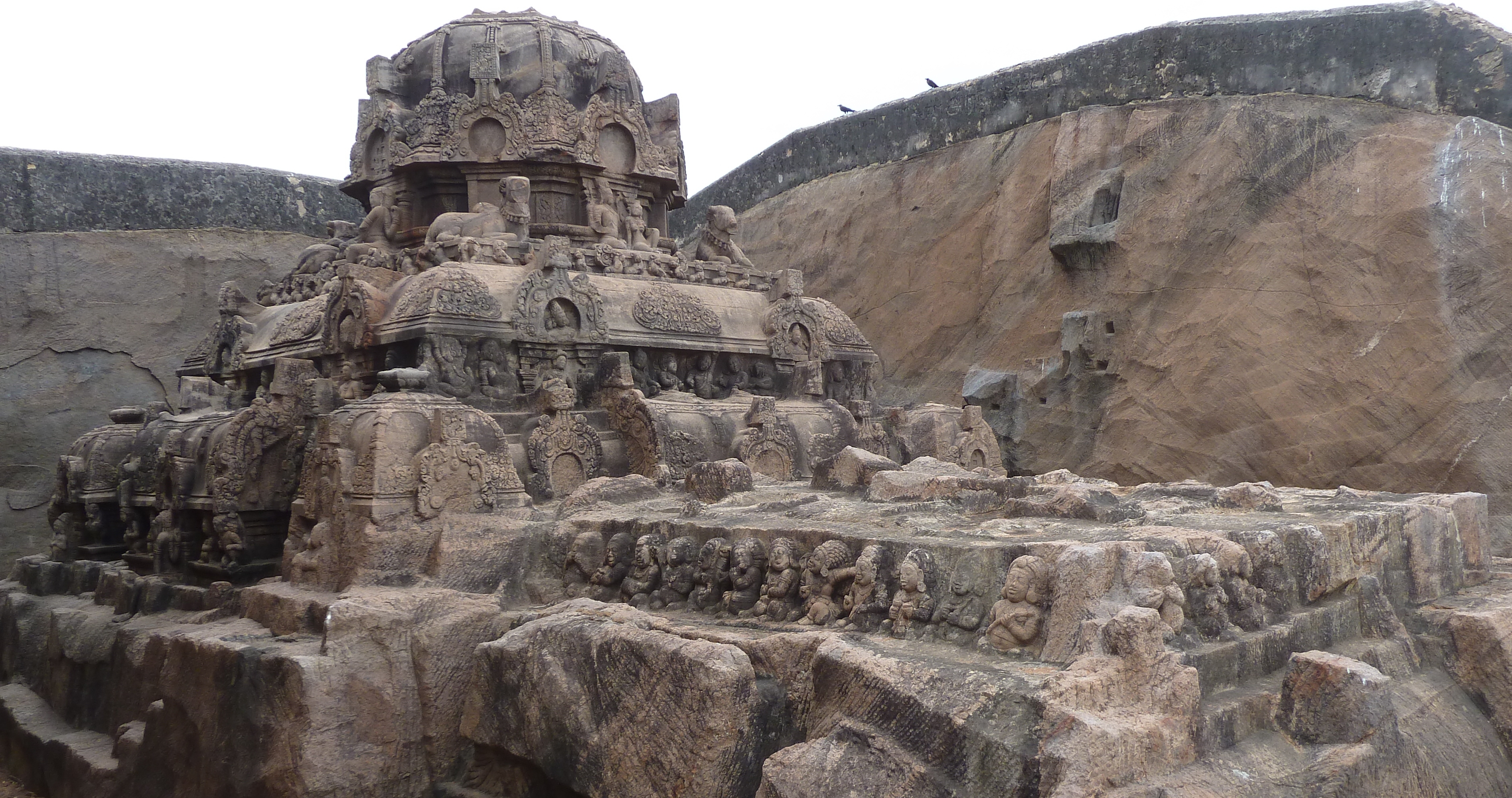
Vettuvan Koil

=== Vettuvan Koil ===
Vettuvan Koil (English: a Sculptor's paradise) is a Hindu temple built between the 8th and 9th century. Kalugumalai is a priceless unfinished Pandyan monolith cave temple, part of the iconographic richness that helped chronicle the burgeoning richness of the Tamil culture, traditions, and sacred centres containing religious art. About 7.5 meter of the mountain is excavated in a rectangular fashion and in the middle the temple is sculpted from a single piece of rock. The carvings reflect the southern temple style of the Pandya era. Only the top portion of the temple is completed. The temple has an entrance and centre hall for the main deity. In the later days Ganesha's idol is kept and worshipped. At the top of the temple beautiful sculpture of Uma Maheswarar, Dakshinamoorthy, Vishnu and Brahma can be found. This temple is of same style of Kailasnath temple in Ellora, structural shrines at Pattadakal in Bijapur, monolithic temples of Pallavas at Mamallapuram showing the close political relationship between Pallavas, Chalukyas and Rashtrakutas. There are around 122 sculptures in the rock cut temple. The intricately carved statues are from fine granite. Here, another temple is the Sri Ananthamma Kovil.

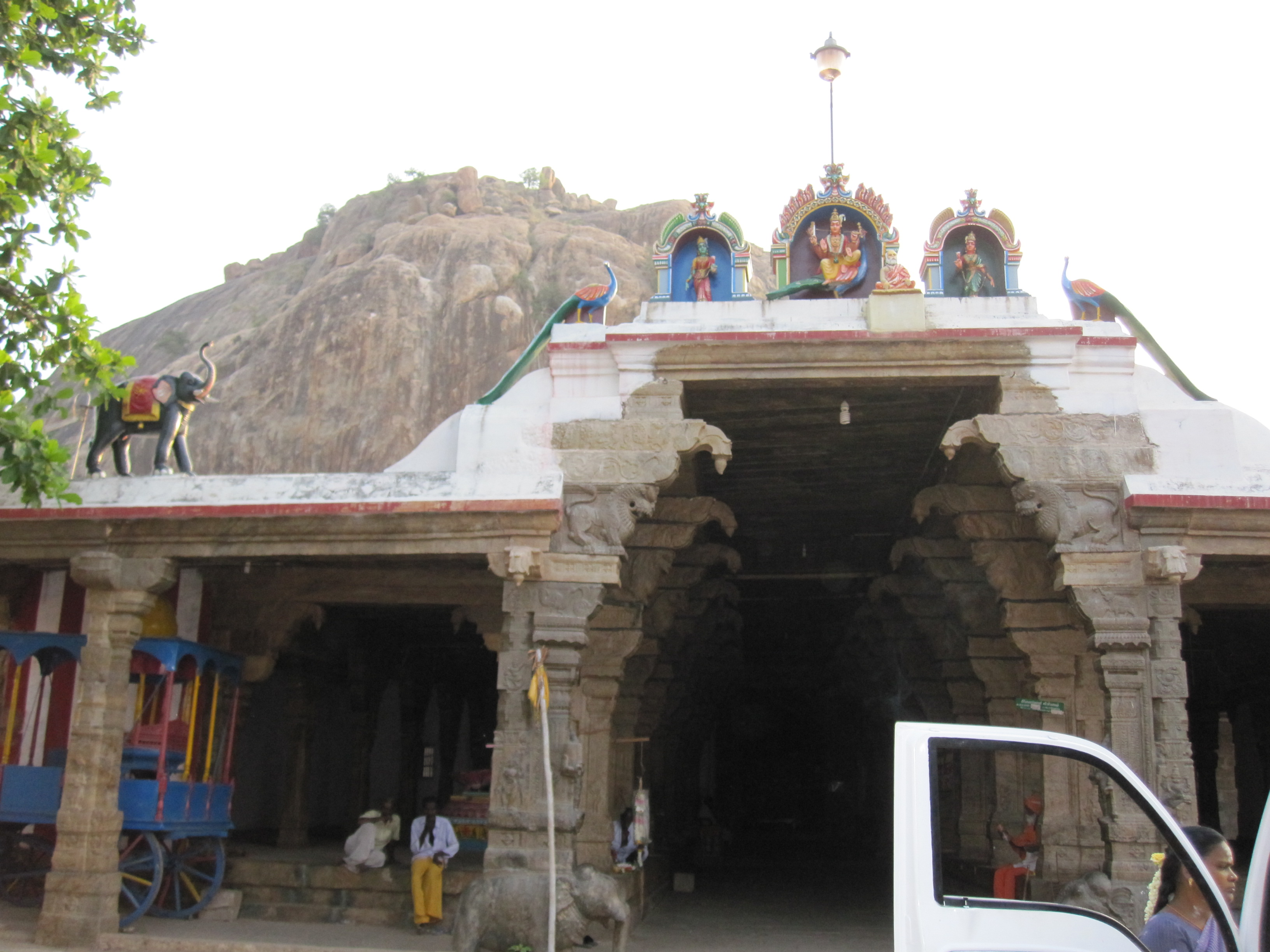
Kazhugasalamoorthy Murugan temple facade

=== Kalugasalamoorthy Temple ===
Kalugasalamoorthy Temple's main deity is Murugan. The main deity hall and entrance hall is excavated inside the foothills of Kalugumalai in the south western corner of the hill and with external structural additions. The temple has many aesthetic sculptures. The temple dates to the 18th century. The main deity is Lord Murugan with his wife Deivanai. The temple complex also has shrines of Shiva, Akilandeswari, Vinayakar and many lesser deities.

=== Ayyanar Temple ===
Ayyanar temple is located on the Kalugumalai hill adjacent to the historical Jain carvings at the hill. The holy tree of this Ayyanar temple is a Banyan Tree. The Sanctorum of the temple is within a natural cavern. There are three bas-reliefs of Tirthankaras near the Ayyanar image.

Ayyanar Kovil at Kalugumalai is located at 9°9′7.2″N 77°42′13.7″E (9.151995°N 77.703815°E).

Telugu speaking community with Maratla gothram and Dhulipati house name worship in this temple, as this their Kuladeiva koil (temple). Special poojas are performed on the eve of Maha Shiva Raathiri every year.

This temple Devotees have to climb several stone steps in the hill to reach this temple. The other prominent landmarks near this temple are Ambal Oorani, Kalugasalamoorthy temple and Vettuvan temple.

People worship Ayyanar by offering sacrifices to him. As the Jain monuments located adjacent to this temple have been declared as a protected monument due to which certain restrictions have been put in the nearby areas. One can see a sign installed by the Archaeological survey of India stating that sacrifices should not be made here.

=== Our Lady of Lourdes Church ===
Our Lady of Lourdes Church is the biggest Roman Catholic Church in the vicinity. This church is more than 100 years old and is adorned with two tall steeples in the front entrance. This church has over 3000 members who gather there every week for prayers and are also actively involved in community activities. A primary school named as St. Mary's Primary School managed by this church is located adjacent to it.

== Trade ==
Kalugumalai, along with surrounding villages, specializes in the manufacturing of safety matches. There are hundreds of small scale industries involved in this trade, supported by the dry climatic condition and skilled labor available. Grocery business is another one doing in large scale.
