= Kovilpatti =

- Town
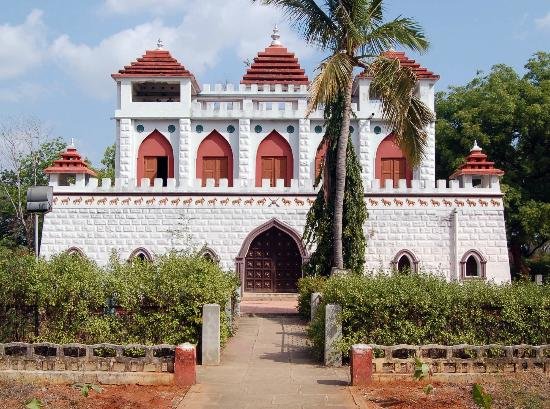
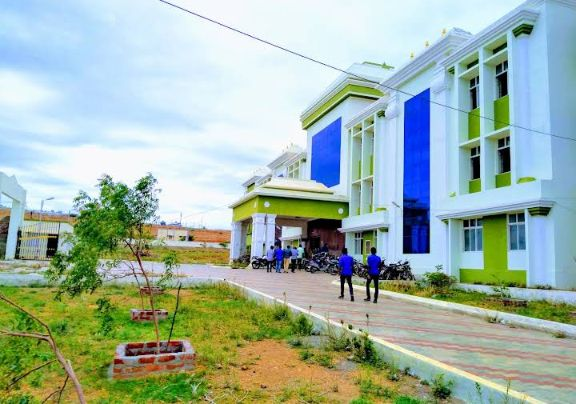
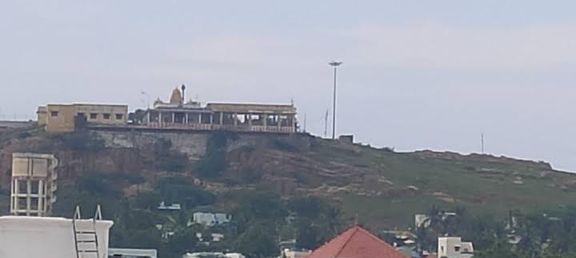
- From top: Kattabomman Memorial; Government Arts College; Kathiresan malai temple
- Nickname: Hockeypatti
- Kovilpatti, Tamil Nadu
- Coordinates: 9°10′28″N 77°52′06″E
- Country: India
- State: Tamil Nadu
- District: Thoothukudi

Government
  - Type: Municipality
  - Body: Kovilpatti Municipality

Area
  - Total: 6.48 km^{2} (2.50 sq mi)
- Elevation: 130 m (430 ft)

Population (2011)
  - Total: 95,057
  - Density: 14,700/km^{2} (38,000/sq mi)

Languages
  - Official Tamil: Tamil
- Time zone: UTC+5:30 (IST)
- Postal code: 628501
- Vehicle registration: TN 96
- Website: www.tnurbantree.tn.gov.in/kovilpatti/

Kovilpatti is a town in Thoothukudi District, Tamil Nadu, India.

== Geography ==
Kovilpatti is located in Thoothukudi District, Tamil Nadu. It has an average elevation of 101 m (331 ft). Kalugumalai is a 300 ft (91 m) high dome-shaped rock located on the road connecting Kovilpatti and Sankarankovil. It has two rock-cut temples.

=== Climate ===
Kovilpatti has a hot and dry climate with average temperatures ranging from 22 to 37 °C (72 to 99 °F). April to June are the hottest months, while December and January are the coldest with temperatures rising towards the end of February. The town receives most of the rainfall during the northeast monsoon from October to December. The average precipitation is about 84 cm (33 in).

== Demographics ==
According to the 2011 census, Kovilpatti had a population of 95,057 across 25,099 households. 8,325 residents were under the age of six: 4,158 male and 4,167 female. The town had a sex ratio of 1,065 females per 1,000 males exceeding the national average of 929. Scheduled Castes and Scheduled Tribes accounted for 10.32% and 0.84% of the population respectively. The literacy rate was 81.27%, compared to the national average of 72.99%.

There were a total of 41,006 workers, comprising 85 cultivators, 165 main agricultural labourers, 932 workers in household industries, 36,989 other workers, and 2,835 marginal workers. Marginal workers included 26 cultivators, 26 agricultural labourers, 262 workers in household industries, and 2,521 other marginal workers. As per the census, the population comprised of 92.29% Hindus, 2.48% Muslims, 5.12% Christians, 0.01% Sikhs, 0.01% Buddhists, and 0.08% followers of other religions.

== Administration and politics ==
The Kovilpatti Assembly constituency is part of the Thoothukkudi Lok Sabha constituency.

== Economy ==
Kovilpatti is also known for 'kadalai mittai' (peanut candy). The Manthithoppu Transgenders' Milk Producers' Cooperative Society is the first cooperative society in the country run by transgender people.

== Transport ==
Kovilpatti is situated along National highway 44 and has two bus stations. The Kovilpatti railway station caters to the town.
