= Kundrakudi Adigal =

Tamil orator and writer (1925–1995)

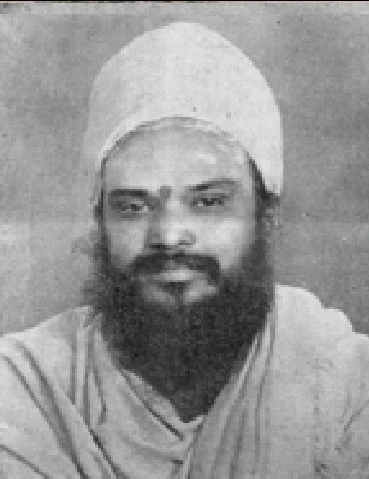
- Kundrakudi Adigal
- Born: Aranganathan; 11 July 1925; Naduthittu, Tanjore District, Madras Presidency, British India (now Mayiladuthurai district, Tamil Nadu, India)
- Died: 15 April 1995 (aged 69)
- Parents: Srinivasa Pillai (father); Sornathammal (mother)

Srinivasa Pillai Aranganathan (11 July 1925 – 15 April 1995), popularly known as Kundrakudi Adigal was a Saivite ascetic, Tamil orator, and writer from Tamil Nadu, India. He has written many books about Saivism and Tamil Literature.

== Early life ==
He was born Aranganathan on 11 July 1925 in Naduthittu (a village in present-day Mayiladuthurai district to Srinivasa Pillai and Sornathammal. He had two elder brother and one elder sister.

== Religious work ==
In 1945 he joined Dharumapuram Mutt. Here he learned saivism, Tamil Literature. Later he joined Kundrakudi Thiruvannamalai Mutt. On 16 June 1952 he was appointed as 45th pointiff of the mutt. He introduced many reforms in the mutt such as abolishing caste-based admission in the mutt.

His statue installed posthumously at the mutt is garlanded on his birthday by the government of Tamil Nadu as a government function.

== Writings ==
The Government of Tamil Nadu nationalized his works in 1990, publishing them under its Tamil Development, Religious Endowments and Information Department. They have since been made available online.

== Awards ==
- Tamil Nadu government's Thiruvalluvar award (1986).
- Honorary D. Litt by Annamalai University (1989).
