= Kunnakudi Subbalakshmi =

- Subbalakshmi at her residence in Hyderabad

Background information
- Also known as: N.Subbalakshmi
- Born: 24 April 1931; Kunnakudi, Madras Presidency, British India
- Died: 21 March 2010 (aged 78) Hyderabad, Andhra Pradesh, India
- Genre: Classical Carnatic

Kunnakudi Subbalakshmi (24 April 1931 – 21 March 2010) was a vocal Carnatic singer and elder sister of eminent violinist Kunnakudi Vaidyanathan.

== Early life ==
She was born in Kunnakudi in the temple town of Lord Murugan in the Southern Indian State of Tamil Nadu under the Madras Presidency.

Her parents were Sri Ramaswamy Sastri and Smt. Meenakshi. Her father was a scholar in Sanskrit and Tamil. He was also a composer of Carnatic Music and Kathakalakshepam. Subbalakshmi learned South Indian Classical Music from her father at a young age.

== Career ==
Subbalakshmi started giving concerts accompanied by her younger sister Sundaralakshmi and Kunnakudi Vaidyanathan. Sundaralakshmi died as a child. Subbalakshmi started giving solo vocal concerts in Karaikudi and Kunnakudi.

She married S. C. Natesan (from a Brahmin Iyer family) at age 19. He was in the army, so they moved frequently. These moves led Subbalakshmi to perform concerts through All India Radio. Natesan was transferred to Delhi, Hyderabad, Pune, Ahmednagar. Subbalakshmi performed at Radio Centers in Hyderabad and Delhi. After that, her husband was transferred to Ahmednagar, in the state of Maharashtra, where he remained for 20 years. Subbalakshmi could not portray her talent because of financial conditions.

The couple had three daughters, Padmini, Lalitha and Rajeshwari. The financial conditions of the family worsened, and in 1984, Natesan was transferred to Hyderabad, where he worked for AOC and retired. Subbalakshmi then performed at All India Radio for 10 years. The couple stayed at Sitaphal Mandi near Secunderabad and started teaching music.

The couple then shifted to Sainikpuri in 2002. Natesan died on 21 June 2003 at age 83. Subbalakshmi continue teaching. She performed various concerts on Sun TV, Doordarshan and Jaya TV. She performed live concerts at Bangalore during the Ramanavami Festival in 2009. She also performed at Chikadpally in Hyderabad, Machilipatnam and Coimbatore. She attended the Tyagaraja Aradhana conducted at Thanjavur for 25 years conducted by her brother Kunnakudi Vaidyanathan.

She knew more than 2500 Keerthanas written by Tyagaraja, MuthuSwamy Dikshitar, Sama Sastri. She also knew many Keerthanas written by her father. Sangeetha Ksheerasagaram and Thyagaraya Gana Sabha jointly organized a five-day music festival at Sabha's venue in 2005 in memory of Uppalapati Ankaiah, a Sangeetha Vidwan. Veteran percussionists were engaged.

== Awards ==
She was awarded the Kalaimamani award by the Government of Tamil Nadu in 2005.

== Death ==
Subbalakshmi died at 2:10 AM on 21 March 2010 at a hospital in Hyderabad.
