= Kunnakudi Thiruvannamalai Mutt Adikam =

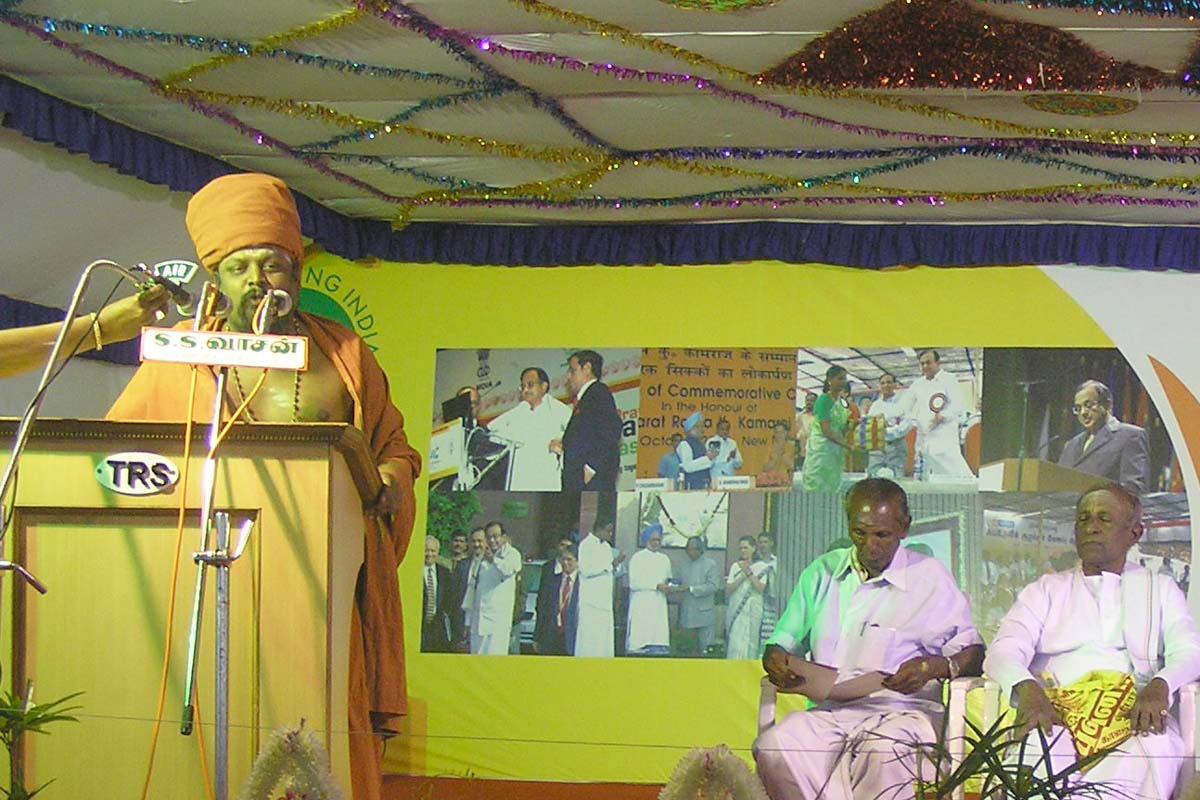
- Kundrakudi Ponnambala Adigalar

- Location in Tamil Nadu, India
- 10.113372583490563°N 78.69868869325357°E
- Location: Kunnakudi, Tamil Nadu, India

History
- Built: 16th century

Tiruvannamalai Adheenam or Kunnakudi Tiruvannamalai Mutt Adikam (also called Kunnakudi Tiruvannamalai Mutt Adikam or Kunnakudi Adheenam) is a Saivite monastic institution based in the town of Kunnakudi in South India established during the 16th century. The Mutt is involved in inculcating Saiva Siddhanta philosophy, a branch of the Hindu sect of Saivism. The temple maintains and administers the Shanmughanathar Temple.

The mutt emerged with popular socialistic views during the tenure of the 45th pontiff Deivasigamni Arunachala Desiga Adigal. The mutt is involved in social empowerment of the villages and is involved in social service for the villages in and around Kunnakudi. The mutt closely works with NGOs in the region for rural development.

== History ==
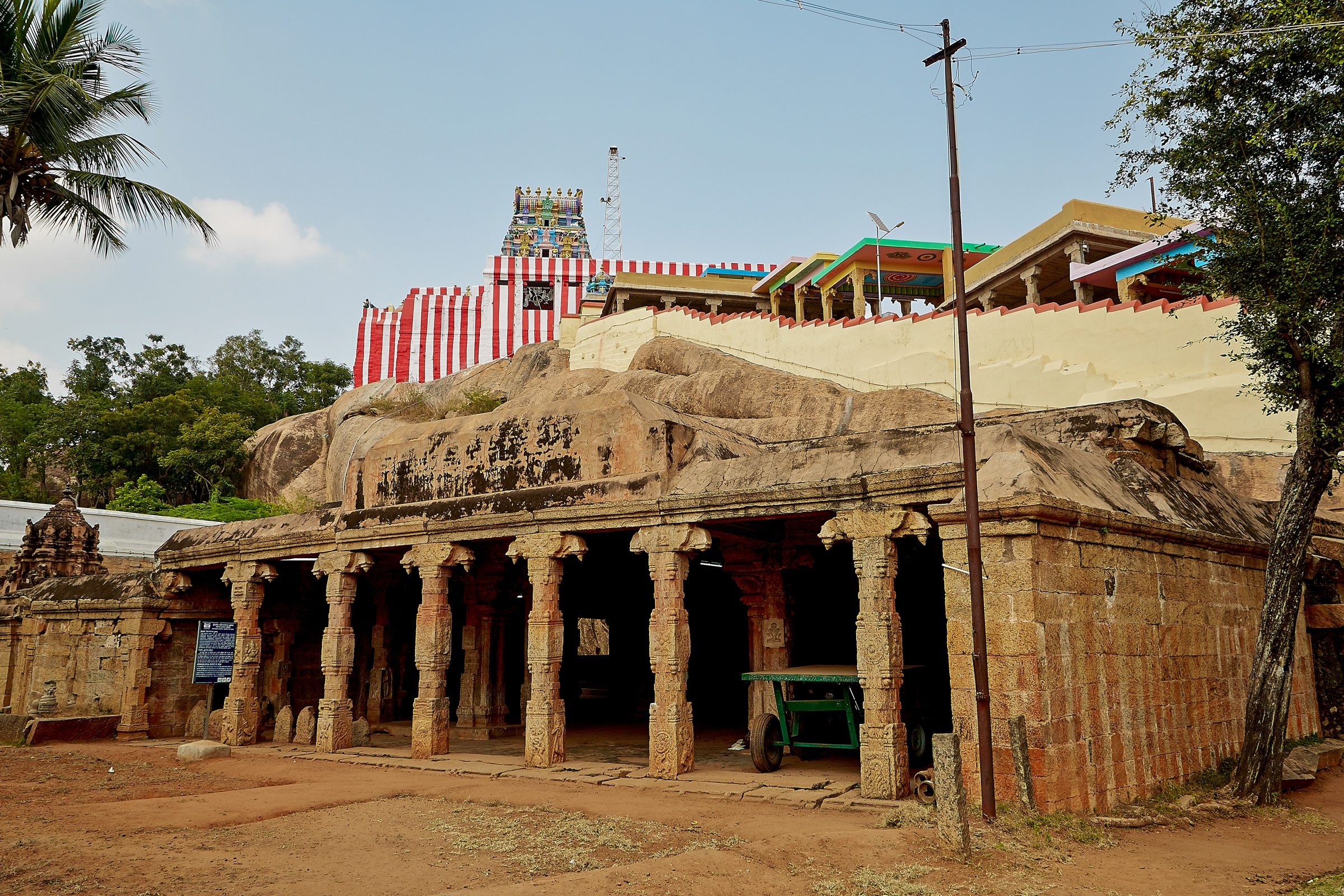
The rock cut Shanmughanathar Temple, Kunnakudi maintained by the Mutt

The adheenam was founded during the 16th century, along with the Dharmapuram Adheenam, Thiruvaduthurai Adheenam and the Thiruppanandal Adheenam, to spread the ideology of Saiva Sidhantam.

Srimat Deivasigamani Desiga Paramacharya Swamigal founded a Saiva siddantha math at Tiruvannamalai, in North Arcot district. Later on, the disciples of the math, now called Kunnakudi Thiruvannamalai Mutt Adikam, settled down at Piranmalai. About 200 years ago, due to religious and administrative convenience and at the request of Sethupathi Raja of Ramnad, they shifted the activity to Kunnakudi in Tirupathur Taluk of the Ramanathapuram district. The math is The founder of the adheenam had a very cordial relation with Vellala Maharaja and was the disciple of Arulnandi Sivacharya Swamigal, who established the Saiva siddantha philosophy in Tamil Nadu

Kundrakudi Adigal served as pontiff until his death in 1995.

== Social aspects ==
Under the aegis of Srilasri Deivasigamani Arunachala Desiga Paramacharya Swamigal, the mutt was involved in social activities beyond the traditional religious services offered. The mutt followed social movement under his tutelage, advocated socialism and supported co-operative movement. The mutt started working against poverty by empowering the villages in and around Kunnakudi. The mutt is involved in social empowerment of the villages and is involved in social service for the villages in and around Kunnakudi. The mutt closely works with NGOs in the region for rural development. During the 1960s, the mutt started inter-caste dining, which was not followed till that time. The pontiff also started writing and publishing views to fight social evils like caste system, crime against women, child marriage and dowry system. The mutt conducts debating and Tamil language related events to help in the development of the language and the society.
