= Pandyan art and architecture =

Pandyan Art and Architecture
- Years active: 3rd century BCE - 14th century CE
- Location: India
- Influences: Deities of Hinduism: Brahma, Vishnu, and Shiva.

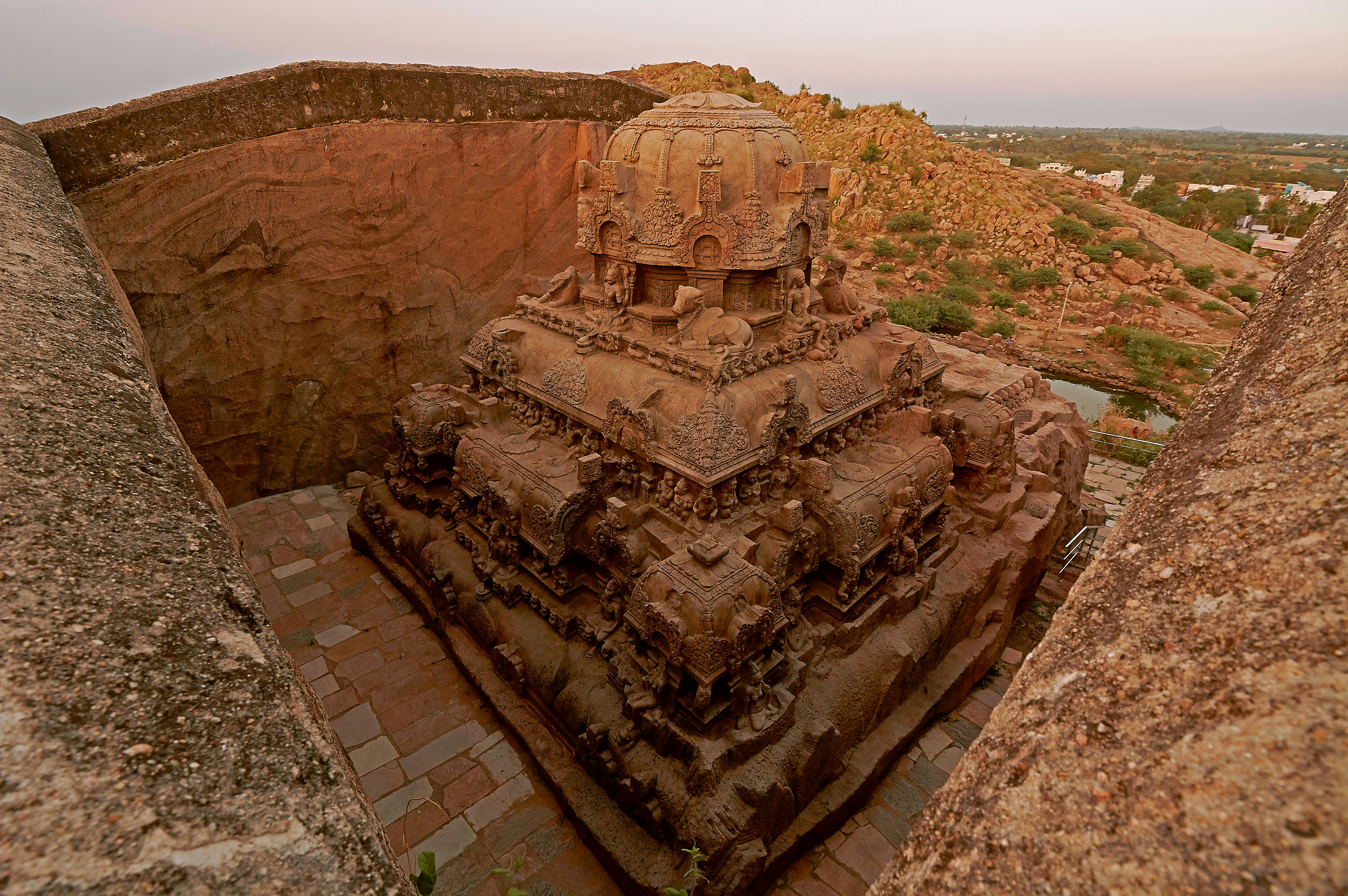
Vettuvan Koil in Kalugumalai, Pandyan architecture, 8th century CE

The Pandyan empire is believed to have first emerged circa 600 BC and was one of the leading Tamil dynasties of Southern India. There were various forms of art and many architectural communities within the empire, and their work was sold to overseas markets. Rock cutting and structural temples are examples of these, playing a significant role in Pandyan culture. The rock carvings typically depicted religious figures, floral motifs and animals and were made to surround temples and shrines.

The vimana, gopuram and mandapa are some of the predominant features of the early Pandyan temples. Groups of small temples are seen at the Tiruchirappalli district of Tamil Nadu. In the later stages of Pandyan rule, finely sculptured idols, gopurams and vimanas were developed. Gopurams are the rectangular entrance and portals of the temples.

Other integral art forms of these Pandyan communities were the paintings, poetry, music and punch-marked coins, each with symbols and transcriptions holding meaning to society.

== History ==
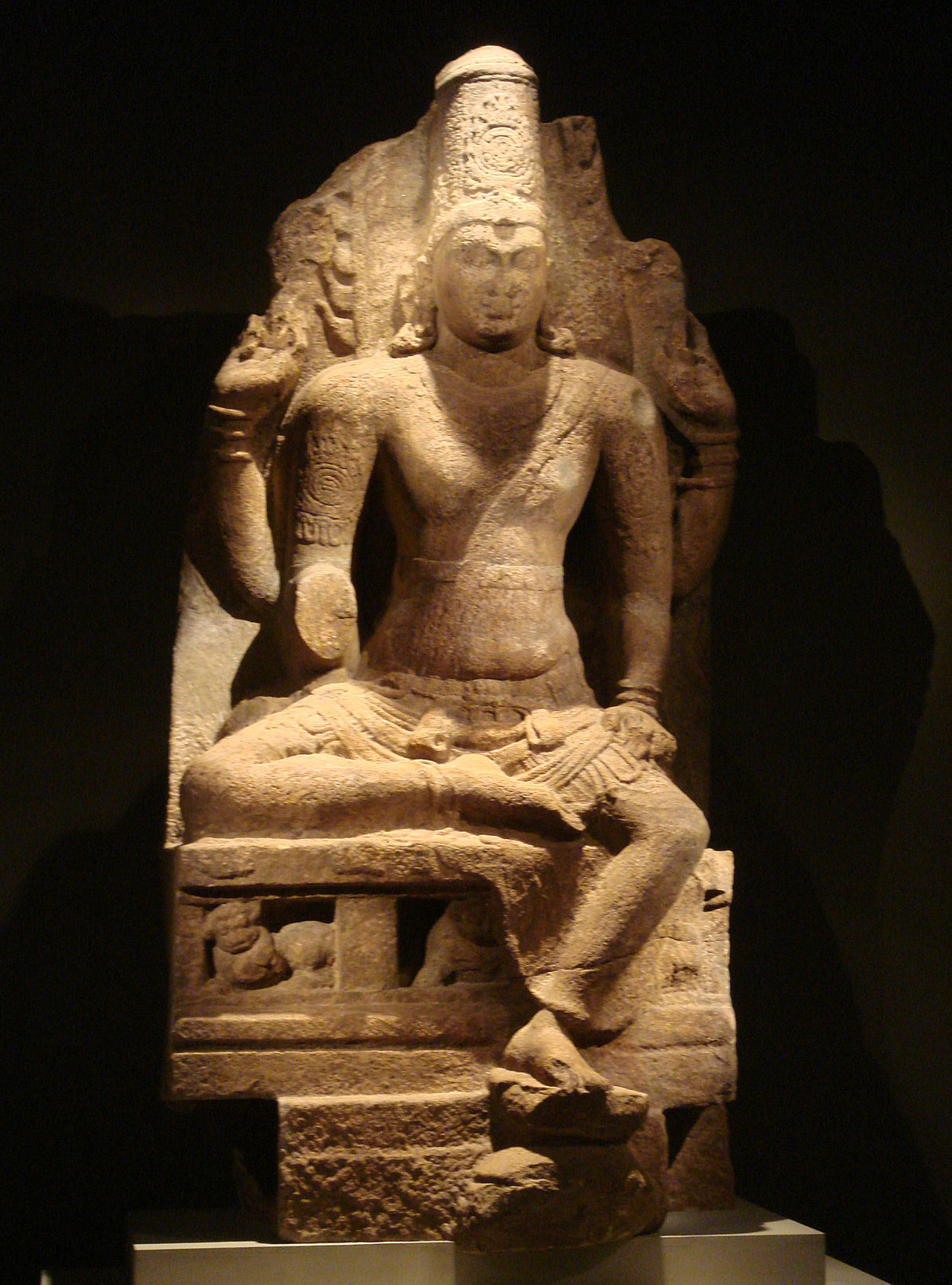
Four-armed Vishnu, Pandya Dynasty, 8th–9th century CE.

The Pandyan kingdom was one of the three major empires of the Tamil dynasty in Tamil Nadu, India. Pandya, meaning 'big' or 'strong', is the oldest of these empires, prevailing for what is estimated to be four to five centuries. Despite some uncertainty around the structure of these Tamil empires, the history becomes clearer after the beginning of the common era. This became a period of extensive travel and trade between these Tamil speaking kingdoms and between Tamil Nadu and other countries. There is mention of the Pandyan kings in both Greek and Roman history which reflects this ancient international trade relationship. Madurai was the capital city of early the Pandyan kingdom and was the heart of notable temple architecture during this period.

== Artisan communities ==
The Pandya's were known for their unique art forms that differed from the other kingdoms of Tamil Nadu. There were various communities each providing different crafts fundamental to Pandyan culture. It is evident that the empire held a significant influence over art across all of Southern India.

The primary artisan groups formed an association referred to as the Kammalar, composed of a goldsmith, brass smith, blacksmith, carpenter and mason. Their work in Pandya was culturally important across all of Tamil Nadu as well as being important to trade in the overseas market.

Another notable example of key artisanal communities in Pandya were the sculptors and stonemasons. The stonemasons carved cave temples made of granite rock, influenced by the head of gods central to their religion. The rock sculptures had a distinctive style that included wide chests and shoulders, and long faces that contrasted the petite hips and soft features. An example of these key stone carvings is seen at the entrance of a cave temple at Pillaiyarpatti. The inscription under the sculpture refers to the carving as ‘Deśivināyagar’, a figure still worshiped in the area today.

Jewellery was another art form practiced by the craftsmen of Pandya. They used gold, stones and pearls to create various ornaments sold to overseas buyers. The jewellery had images of their gods and symbols that represented their gods engraved into the gold. Pieces from the Pandyan period have been found with floral engravings and inscriptions dedicated to the God Tirumalai Suvadigal on the surface.

== Coin styles ==
The art of coin making in the Pandyan dynasty used punch-marking methods, which was a type of early Indian coinage known for its unique symbols and irregular shapes. They ranged in colours from gold, silver and copper, depending on the political influence of the time. Some of the earliest coins were square shaped and were marked with elephant symbols on one side. In later periods the coins were marked with fish, heraldic symbols, and various emblems. The fish that are seen on Pandyan coins are the same as those notable on the national Pandyan flag, which includes a double fish emblem. Other coin styles depict a Chola influence as they contain a tiger motif, and human figures. The kammatasor were the workers responsible for minting these various coins in the Tamil country.

== Paintings ==
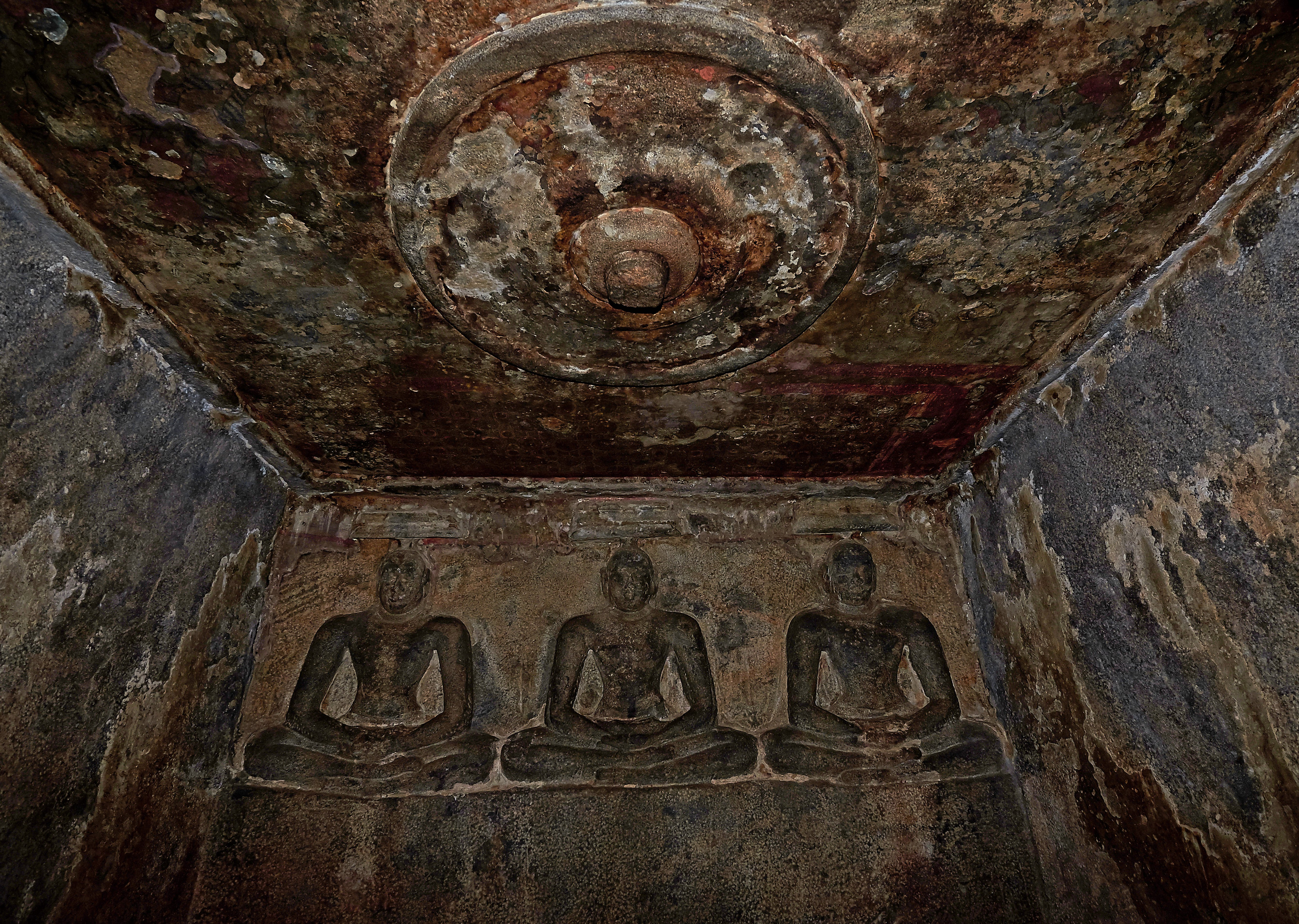
Murals of the Sittannavasal Jain Temple, dating back to 7th century CE

The rule of both the Pandya's and the Cholas is referred to as the ‘golden period’ of art and culture in the ancient cities of Tamil Nadu. The paintings of the Pandyan dynasty share similarities to that of Buddhist and Hindu art found in the Brihadeesvara temple. Common motifs seen in Pandyan paintings include animals, royal figures, floral patterns and lotus leaves. Sittannavasal is a Jain temple originating under Pandyan ruling which is home to some of the only Pandyan paintings left in the world. It is famous for its mural paintings covering the walls and roof of the cave. The Sittannavasal paintings contain varied colour schemes, using black pigments from soot, green from Terre verre, red and yellow from ochre and blue from ultramarine. These elaborate colour schemes contrast the typically monochrome, red ochre paintings of other southern Indian dynasties. However, many of these Pandyan paintings in the Sittannavasal temple have been vandalised and are poorly visible in the modern day. Other cave paintings dating to the 9th century include motives of fish, ducks and people dancing.

== Poetry and Music ==
There is evidence of both occupational poets, that recounted on the affairs of the king as a profession as well as those who pursued poetry as a hobby. Sangam poetry, which derived from Pandya, Chola and Chera influence narrated the distinction between love and war and the power of the human experience. Other poetry of the empire reflect a sarcastic and sophisticated take on everyday life in the Pandyan village.

Attruppadai is a genre of ancient Indian poetry whereby one minstrel addresses another. Madurai-Kanchi is a poem written in the Attruppadai genre, admiring Nedunchezian, the Pandyan King.

Many of the kings themselves, were poets and literacy experts that wrote extensively.

Music attributed to the Pandyan period was derived from the poetry and was created by bands of both male and female singers and dancers. Traditionally these long poems were publicly played to music by thirteen musicians, with a variety of instruments. Professional musicians would also chant the melodic poetry outside temples.

== Dance ==
The Pandya's, along with other dynasties of the Tamil Nadu district also participated in various traditional dances. The Deverattam, translating to the god or king dance in Tamil language, was one particularly performed by the Pandyan dynasty. It was generally danced by the kings and fighters after a successful battle against other Indian dynasties. It was a dance of joy and a symbol of hope for the following battles.

== Pandyan architecture ==
The Pandyan dynasty had their own unique temple style that followed on from the chola style temples between 1000 and 1250 AD. The architectural features of Pandyan temples reflected the kingdoms wealth and social position in respect to other dynasties of southern India at the time. They were mostly stone buildings with distinctive qualities such as rectangular ground floors leading into pyramidal floors higher up with gilded roofs above. Surrounding the temples there were various important Hindu mythological figures sculpted into the rock and various animals carved into the pillars.

Key features of Pandyan architecture include the vimanas, mandapas, and the gopuras. The vimana is the structure above and around the main shrine and is the area where the deities are present. The vimana can be single or multi storied, depending on how many deities the temple contains. The mandapa is a pillared hallway or room that ancient Indian dynasties used for religious dancing, music and ceremonies. Larger temples can have more than one mandapa placed to the sides of the main structures. The gopura is another predominant feature of Pandyan architecture and it is the entranceway into the temple. It is a storied structure commonly made of stone, and there can be multiple built around the sides of the temple.

Dravidian style architecture is commonly seen throughout Pandyan temples and it is a southern Indian architectural style. The predominant features of Dravidian architecture are the main tower, referred to as the vimana, and the entrance gateway referred to as the gopuram. The vimana is notable in Dravidian architecture as it is structured as a tiered pyramid that rises up to the sky. This is different to the main tower structures in northern India, which curve up to a point.

There are few standing architectural monuments left from Pandyan ruling and no temples surviving in Madurai, Pandya's capital, preceding the sixteenth century. The temples that do remain, depict the notable features attributed to the rule of the Pandyan kings.

=== Kalugumalai Temple complex (768–800 CE) ===
Kalugumalai is a region of the Pandyan dynasty, home to the Kalugumalai Murugan temple. The Kalugumalai temple complex is designed in Dravidian style and comprises a Gopuram and a Vimana. The entranceway into the Kalugumalai depicts stone cut elephants, creditable to early Pandya's and the exterior of the temple is lined with inscriptions narrating stories of the Lord of the Pandyan empire.

- Kalugumalai Jain Beds
- Kalugasalamoorthy Temple

=== Kunnakudi temple ===
Kunnakudi Shanmughanathar temple(also called Kundrakudi Temple or Kunnakudi Murugan Temple) in Kundrakudi, a village in the outskirts of Karaikudi in Sivaganga district in the South Indian state of Tamil Nadu, is dedicated to the Shaivate god Murugan. Constructed in the Pandyan art and architecture, the temple is located in the Tirupattur – Karaikudi Road, around 14 km (14,000 m) from Karaikudi. There are three caves located on the western side of the lower rock, that has rock-cut shrines from the Pandyan Empire from the 8th century. The caves have the earliest sculptural representation of Dvarapalas, the guardian deities, for any South Indian temple.The temple has a five-tiered gateway tower, the gopuram in the hill, leading to a pillared hall and the sanctum.

=== Vettuvan koil ===
Vettuvan koil is a temple structure carved into the side of a rocky cliff that can be attributed to the Pandyas circa 8th century ACE. Although unfinished, the temple displays a rectangular front area with a square vimana bordered by realistic rock-cut sculptures of flowers and Jain figures. The carvings are separated into various levels that reflect the bas-relief art form significant to Pandyan communities. Vettuvan koil is Tamil for 'heaven of sculptures' and it was carved under rule of Pandyan King, Parantakan Nedunjadaiyan. It is bordered by pavement and has the shikhara (rising peak of the temple) coming out directly from the canopy. It is architecturally notable for its intricate shrine carved in the middle that has sculptures seated around the border. These sculptures are unique as they do not reflect the typical position of ancient south Indian and Pandyan figures. Usually, figures are sculpted in a front-on position, however the sculptures of Vettuvan koil are seated, unlike others throughout India.

=== Āņaimalai ===
Āņaimalai is a district of south India that is home to key landmarks of Pandyan architecture. A rock cut temple cave, referred to in modern times as the Narasinga-perumal temple is located here. It is a stone temple with two pillars cut out and a shrine in the centre. Just near to this is another rock cut temple with architectural features similar to that of the Pallava kingdom. It has a lotus engraving on the front pillars and four rock sculptures dedicated to Hindu deity, Vishnu.

=== Tirunelveli Nellaiappar temple ===
Nellaiappar temple is a large rock-cut style temple with five gopurams, notable for the aesthetic features carved into the roof and pillars. A key feature of the Nellaiappar temple are the 161 musical pillars, which when struck make a different musical note. The Nellaiappar temple was also home to Pandyan paintings of the time, including paintings of lotuses and other floral motifs.

- Nellaiappar Temple

=== Others ===
- Meenakshi Amman Temple
- Sittanavasal Cave – Rock cut cave and Paintings from 9th century Pandyan period
- Srivilliputhur Andal temple
- Ranganathaswamy Temple

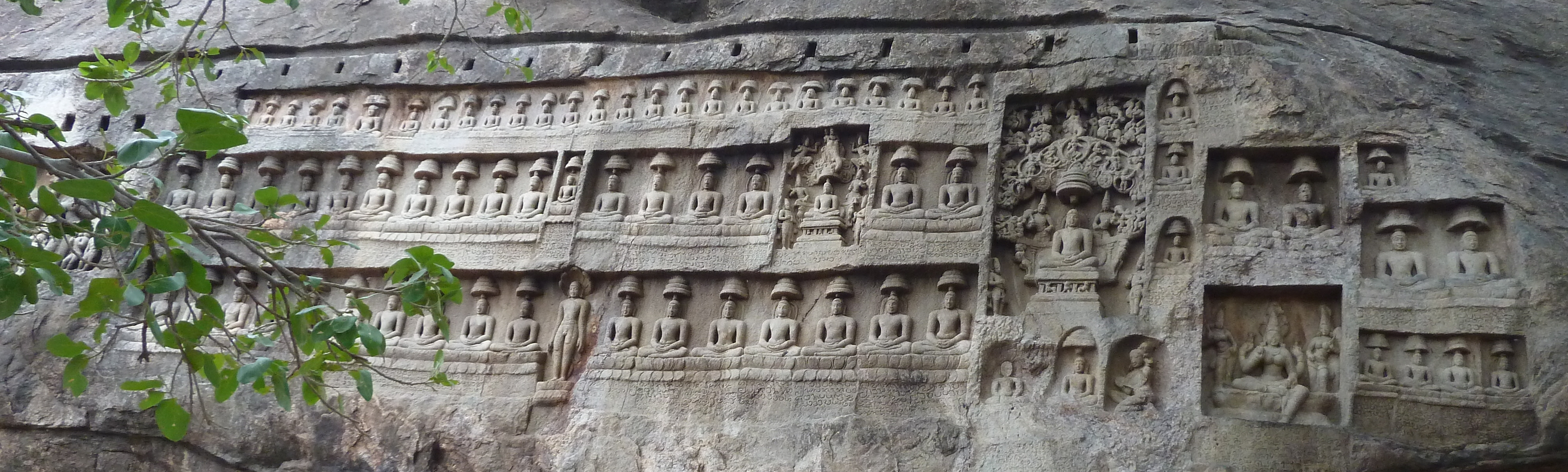
Kalugumalai Jain Beds, Pandyan Empire, King Parantaka Nedunjadaiya (768–800 CE)
