= Shanmughanathar Temple, Kunnakudi =

Kunnakudi Shanmuganathar Temple
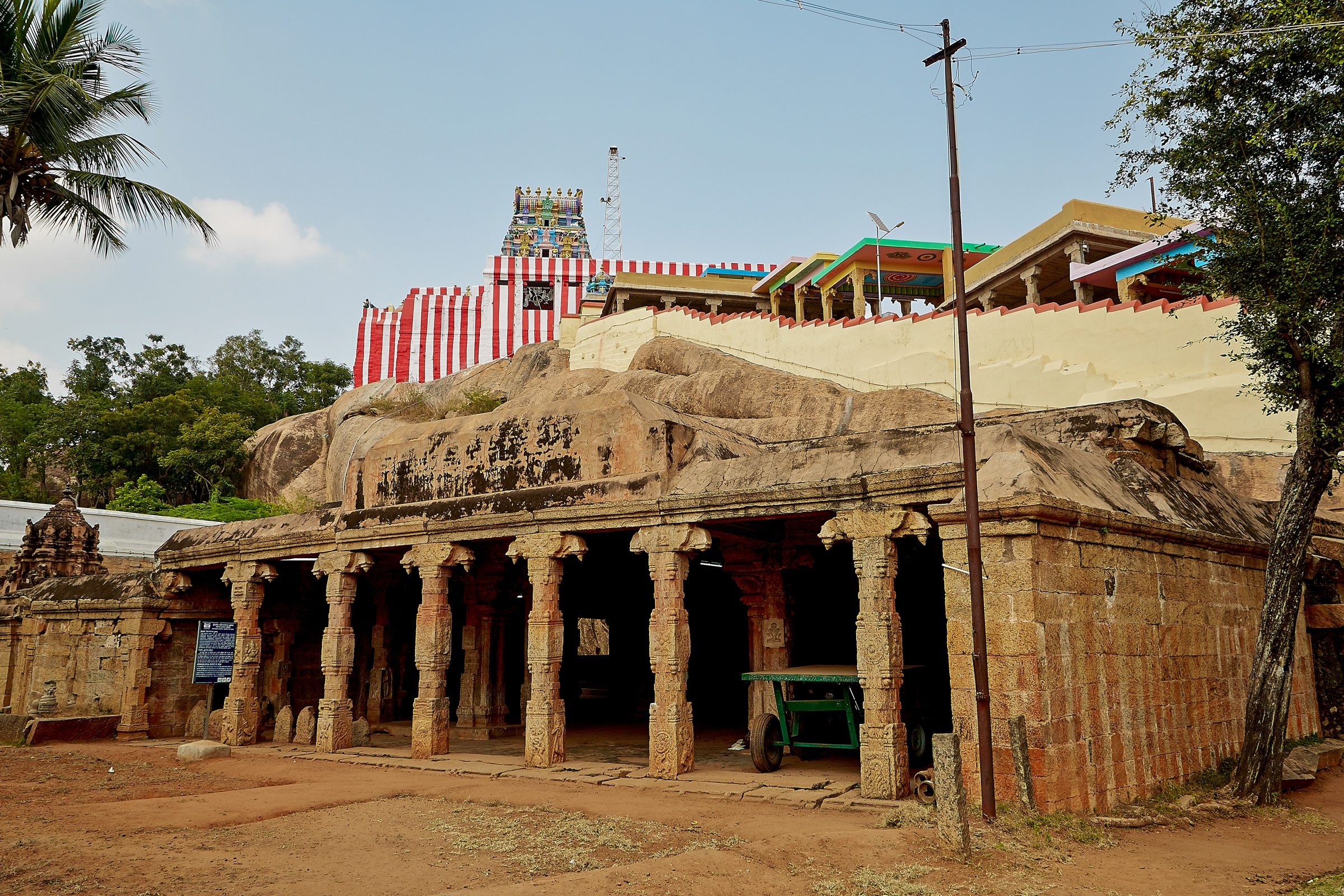
- Image of the temple atop the hill

- Location in Tamil Nadu

Religion
- Affiliation: Hinduism
- District: Sivaganga
- Deity: Kunnakudi Shanmuganathar swamy (Murugan)

Location
- Location: Kundrakudi
- State: Tamil Nadu
- Country: India
- Interactive map of Kunnakudi Shanmuganathar Temple
- Coordinates: 10°06′54″N 78°41′57″E

Architecture
- Type: Tamil architecture

Kunnakudi Shanmughanathar temple (also called Kunnakudi Temple or Kunnakudi Murugan Temple) in Kundrakudi, a village in the outskirts of Karaikudi in Sivaganga district in the South Indian state of Tamil Nadu, is dedicated to the Hindu god Murugan. Constructed in the Hindu style of architecture, the temple is located in the Tirupattur - Karaikudi Road, around 14 km (14,000 m) from Karaikudi. There are three caves located on the western side of the lower rock, that has rock-cut shrines from the Pandyan Empire from the 8th century. The caves have the earliest sculptural representation of Dvarapalas, the guardian deities, for any South Indian temple.

The temple has a five-tiered gateway tower, the gopuram in the hill, leading to a pillared hall and the sanctum. The temple is open from 6:00 am – 12:00 am and 4 - 8:00 pm. Four daily rituals and many yearly festivals are held at the temple, of which Panguni Uthiram festival celebrated during the Tamil month of Panguni (March - April) and Thaipoosam during Thai (January - February) being the most prominent. The temple is maintained and administered by the Kunnakudi Thiruvannamalai Mutt Adikam, while the rock-cut caves are maintained as a protected monument by the Archaeological Survey of India.

== Legend ==
The place was originally called Kundrakudi as it was located in a hill (Kundram means hill in Tamil), which with the period of time became Kunnakudi. It is also called by other names like Mayuragiri, Mayilmalai, Arasavaram and Krishanagaram as the hill resembles the shape of a peacock. As per Hindu legend, sage Agasthya is believed to have worshipped Murugan at this place.

== Architecture ==
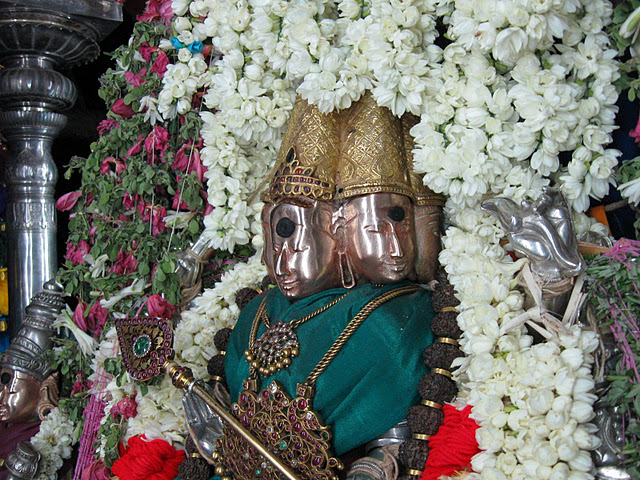
Festival image of the deity depicted with six heads

The temple is located in Kundrakudi, in the outskirts of Karaikudi in Sivaganga district in Tamil Nadu on the road from Tirupattur to Karaikudi. The hill has a height of 40 m (130 ft) and occupies an area of 6.5 acres (26,000 m^{2}). The temple has a five tiered rajagopuram, the gateway tower raising to a height of 16.5 m (54 ft), which pierces the granite wall surrounding the temple. The sanctum faces East and the image of the presiding deity Murugan is sported with the images of his consort Valli and Deivasana, each of whom are seen sitting on a peacock. There are shrines of other deities around the sanctum in the precinct.

There are three caves in the western side of the lower hill, with rock-cut images dedicated to Shiva in each of them. The first two caves have intricate rock-cut sculptures and Dvarapalas on either side of the sanctum, while the third one is plain. There are various sculpted images of Vishnu, Durga, Lingodbhava, Harihara. The image of Dvarapalas in the caves, on either sides of the sanctum, with each leaning in the direction facing the sanctum, are found to be the earliest representation of the images. These are not found in Pallava architecture, which precedes the Pandyas. The caves are considered one of the major specimens of rock-cut architecture of the Pandyas, counted along with Vettuvan Koil, Thirumalaipuram and Thiruparankundram.

== Culture ==
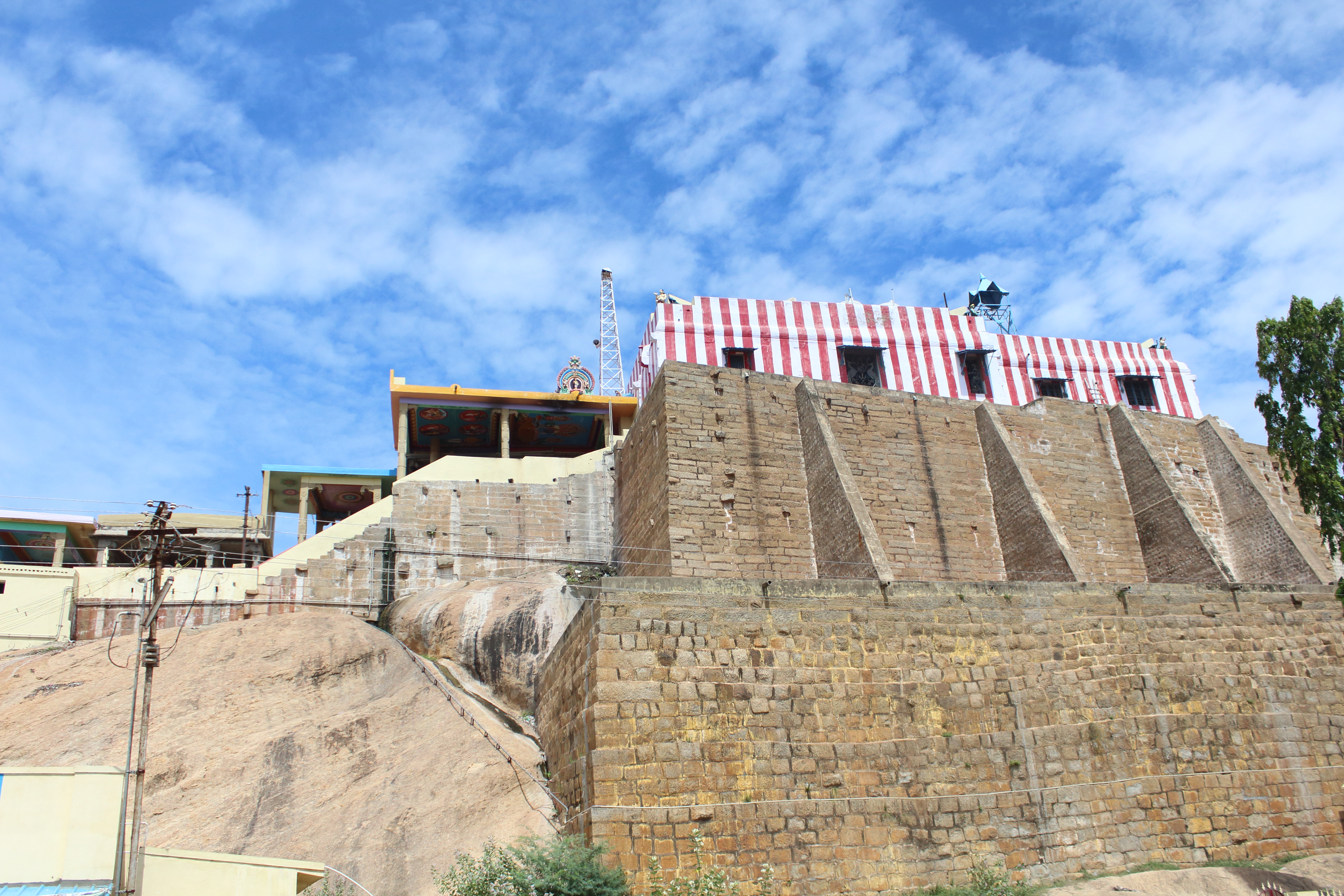
View of the temple from downstairs

The temple priests perform the pooja (rituals) during festivals and on a daily basis. The temple rituals are performed four times a day: Kalasandhi at 6:00 a.m., Uchikala poojai at 11:00 a.m., Sayarakshai at 6:00 p.m., and Arthajama Pooja at 7:45 p.m. Each ritual has three steps: alangaram (decoration), neivethanam (food offering) and deepa aradanai (waving of lamps) for the presiding deities. There are weekly, monthly and fortnightly rituals performed in the temple. The temple is open from 6:30 am – 12:00 pm and 5 - 8:30 pm on all days except during festive occasions when it has extended timings. The major festivals of the temple include the Panguni Uthiram festival celebrated during the Tamil month of Panguni (March - April) and Thaipoosam during Thai (January - February). The other festivals include Kantha Sashti, Vaikasi Visagam, Aavani Moolam and Paal Perukku Vizha. Like other Murugan temples during the festivals, hundreds of devotees carry pots of milk and Kavadi around the streets of the temple. Devotees offer pepper and salt to Saravana Poigai, the temple tank, as a mark of worship. The temple is revered in the verses of Thirupugazh the 15th century anthology on Murugan by Arunagirinathar. The temple finds mentions in Mayuragiri Puranam, a medieval Tamil scripture. Devotees get married in the temple and worship for cure from diseases.

In modern times, the Sivaganga district administration has identified the temple as one of the prominent tourist attractions in the district. The temple is administered by Kunnakudi Thiruvannamalai Mutt Adikam, which was established during the 16th century. In modern times, the caves are maintained and administered by Archaeological Survey of India as a protected monument.
