= Kalugumalai Jain Beds =

Jain temple in Tamil Nadu, India

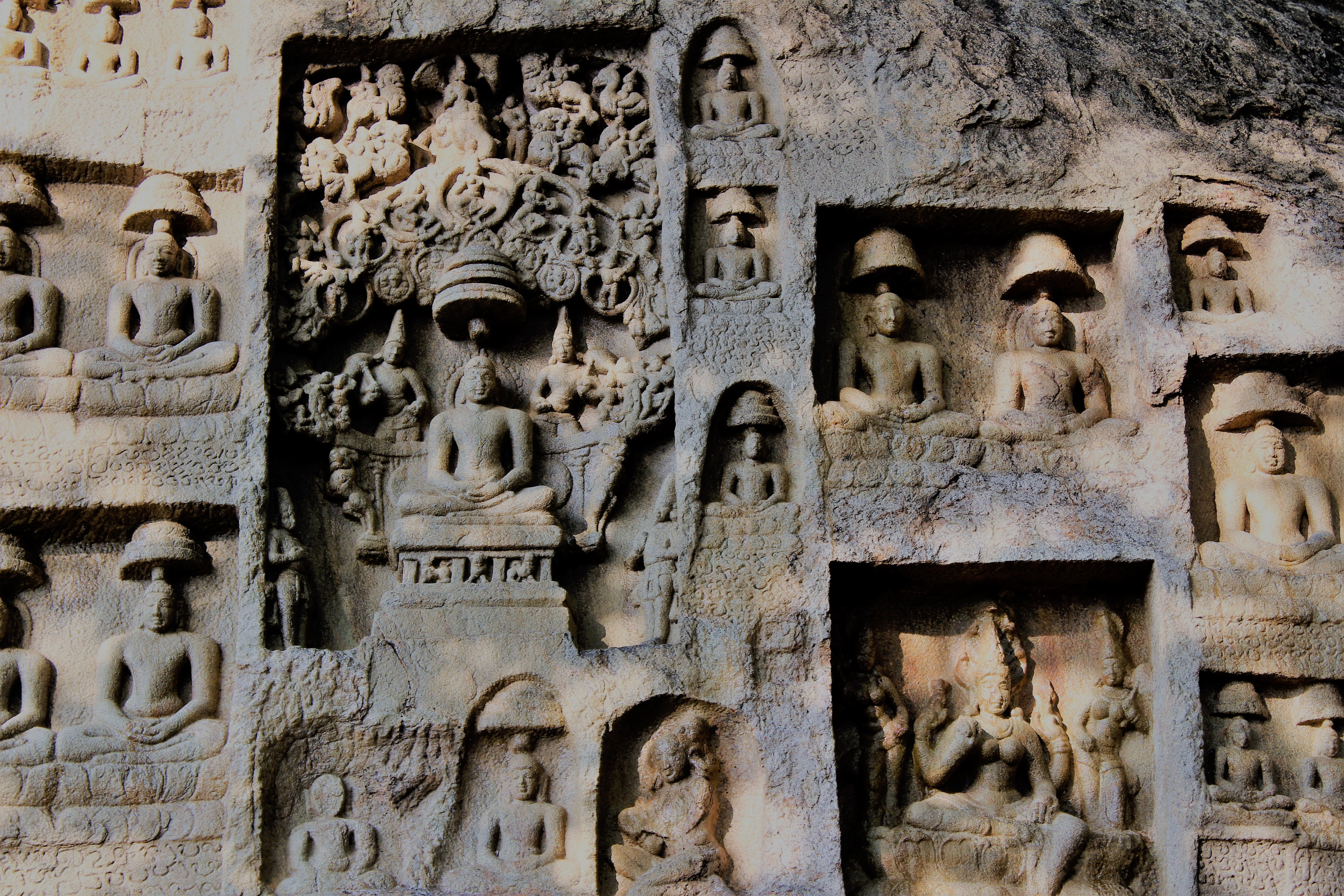
- Kalugumalai Jain Beds

- Location in Tamil Nadu

Religion
- Affiliation: Jainism

Location
- Location: Kalugumalai, Thoothukudi, Tamil Nadu
- Coordinates: 9°09′02″N 77°42′15″E

Architecture
- Style: Pandyan
- Creator: King Parantaka Nedunjadaiya
- Established: 8th century
- Materials: Rock cut

Website
- kalugumalaitemple.tnhrce.in

Kalugumalai Jain beds in Kalugumalai, a panchayat town in Thoothukudi district in the South Indian state of Tamil Nadu, are dedicated to the Jain religious figures. Constructed in rock cut architecture, the unfinished temple is believed to have been built during the reign of Pandyan king Parantaka Nedunjadaiya (768-800 CE). The rock-cut architecture at Kalugumalai is an exemplary specimen of Pandyan art. The other portions of Kalugumalai houses the 8th century unfinished Shiva temple, Vettuvan Koil and Kalugasalamoorthy Temple, a Murugan temple at the foothills.

There are approximately 150 niches in the bed, that includes images of Gomateshwara, Parshvanatha and other Tirthankaras of the Jainism. The Jain beds are maintained and administered by Department of Archaeology of the Government of Tamil Nadu as a protected monument.

== History ==
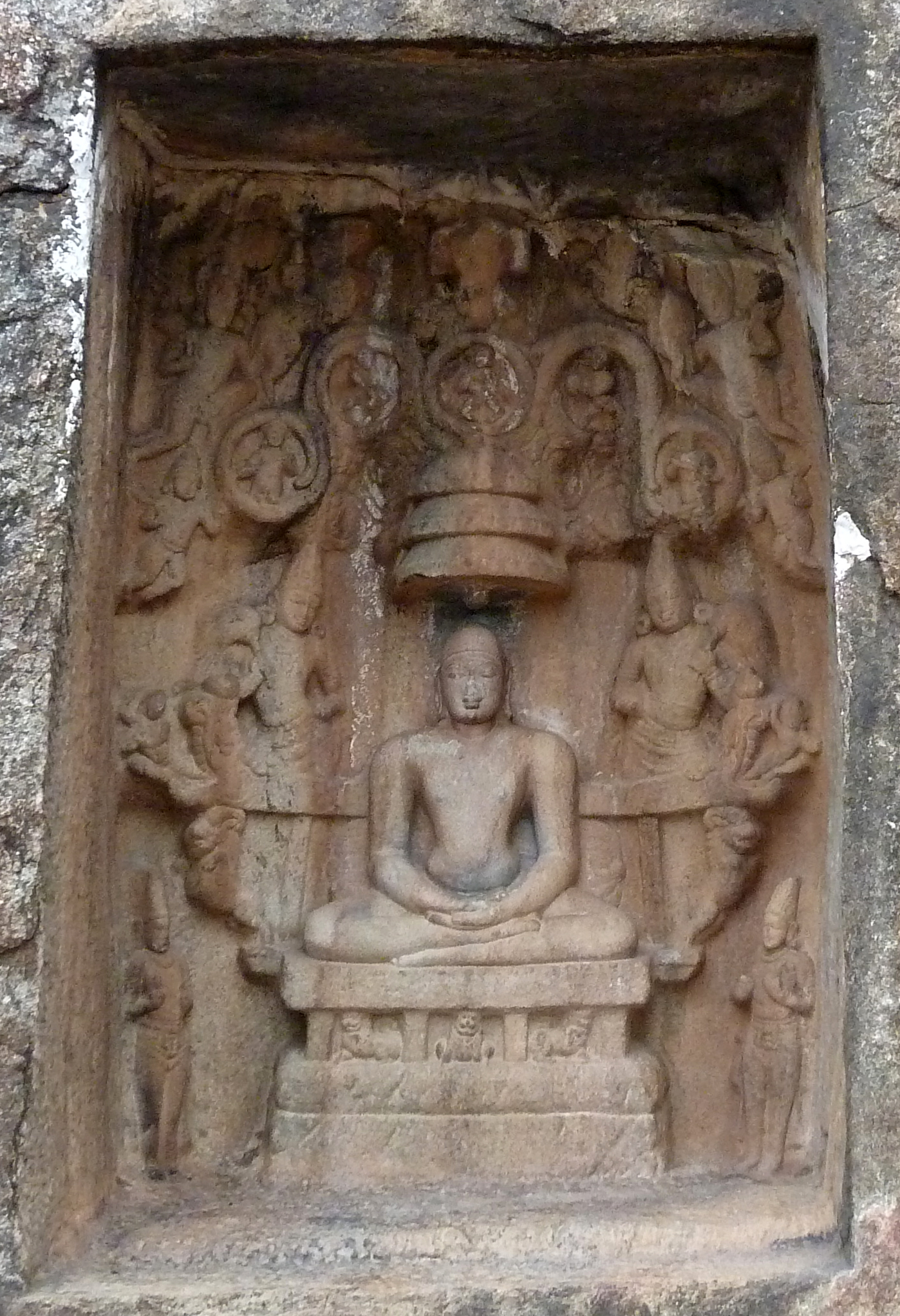
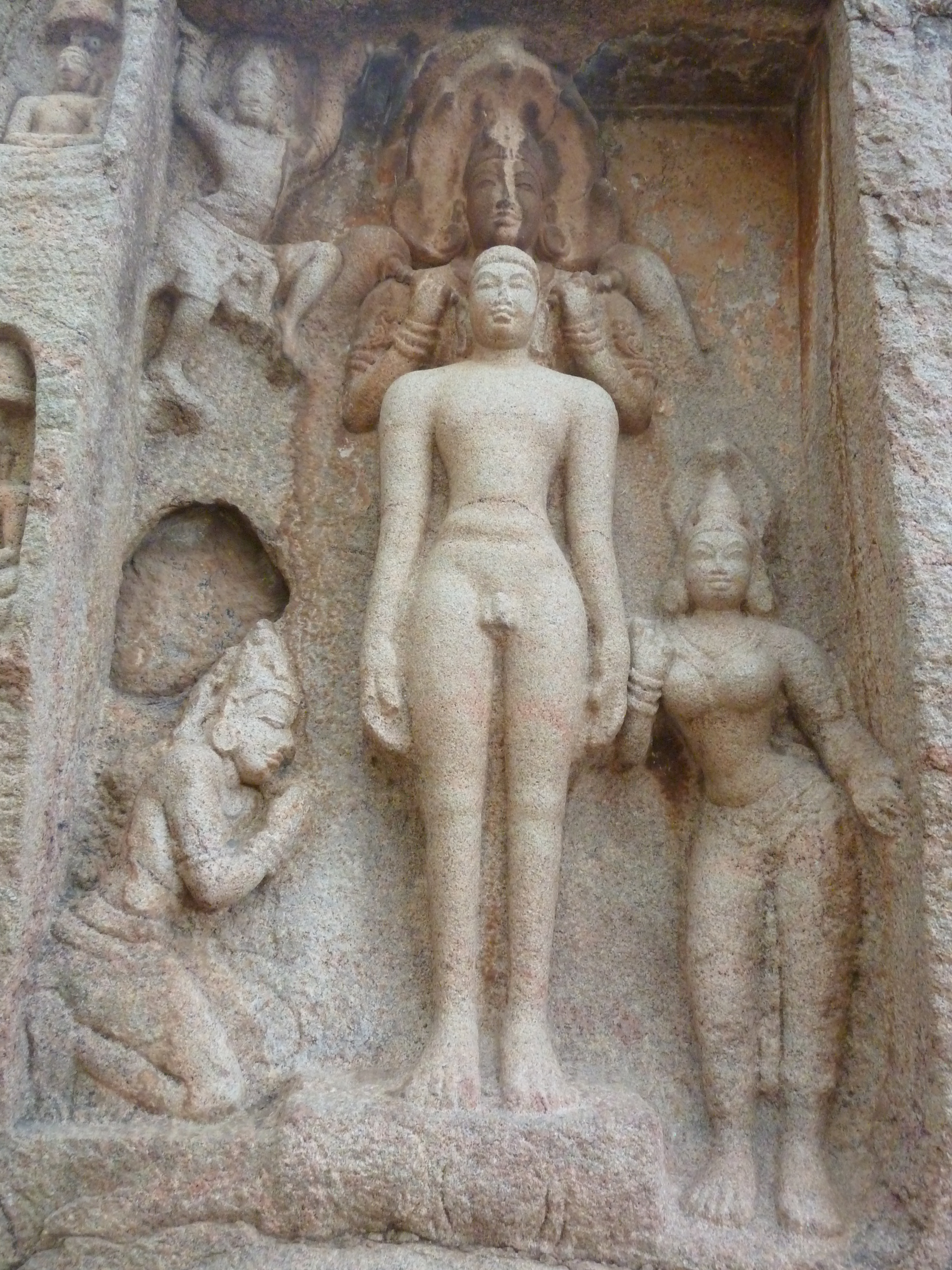
Mahavira and Parshvanatha, in two of the niches

The earliest Kalugumalai Jain Beds are dated to the 8th century based on palaeographic and literary evidence, during the reign of Pandya king Parantaka Nedunjadaiya (768-800 CE).

According to Paul Dundas – a scholar on Jainism studies and Sanskrit, the Kalugumalai is one of the oldest Jain sites in South India. He dates the earliest excavations and inscriptions to about 8th-century CE. All reliefs and inscriptions at Kalugumalai were complete by the late 1st-millennium, while Jainism thrived in this region till about the 14th-century. Like other South Indian Jain historic sites, this was also a Digambara tradition site. However, states Dundas, the word Kalugumalai means "Vulture peak" reminiscent of the legendary site in north India attributed to the Buddha for his sermons. The local traditions connect the history of this stone hillock with early but extinct Buddhism. Perhaps, the hillock was once related to Buddhism, was abandoned and later Jains and Hindus reused the site for their own monasteries and temples. Around the Jain beds hillock are several old Hindu temples from the early Pandya era who also sponsored the Jain beds. These include one for Shiva, one for Murugan, and another for Aiyanar. In the local tradition, states Dundas, the Hindu god Aiyanar is believed to be the guardian deity for Jain temples. During modern times, some Digambara monks attempted replacing the idol of Murugan in the lower cave temple with that of Mahavira, leading to religious disturbances.

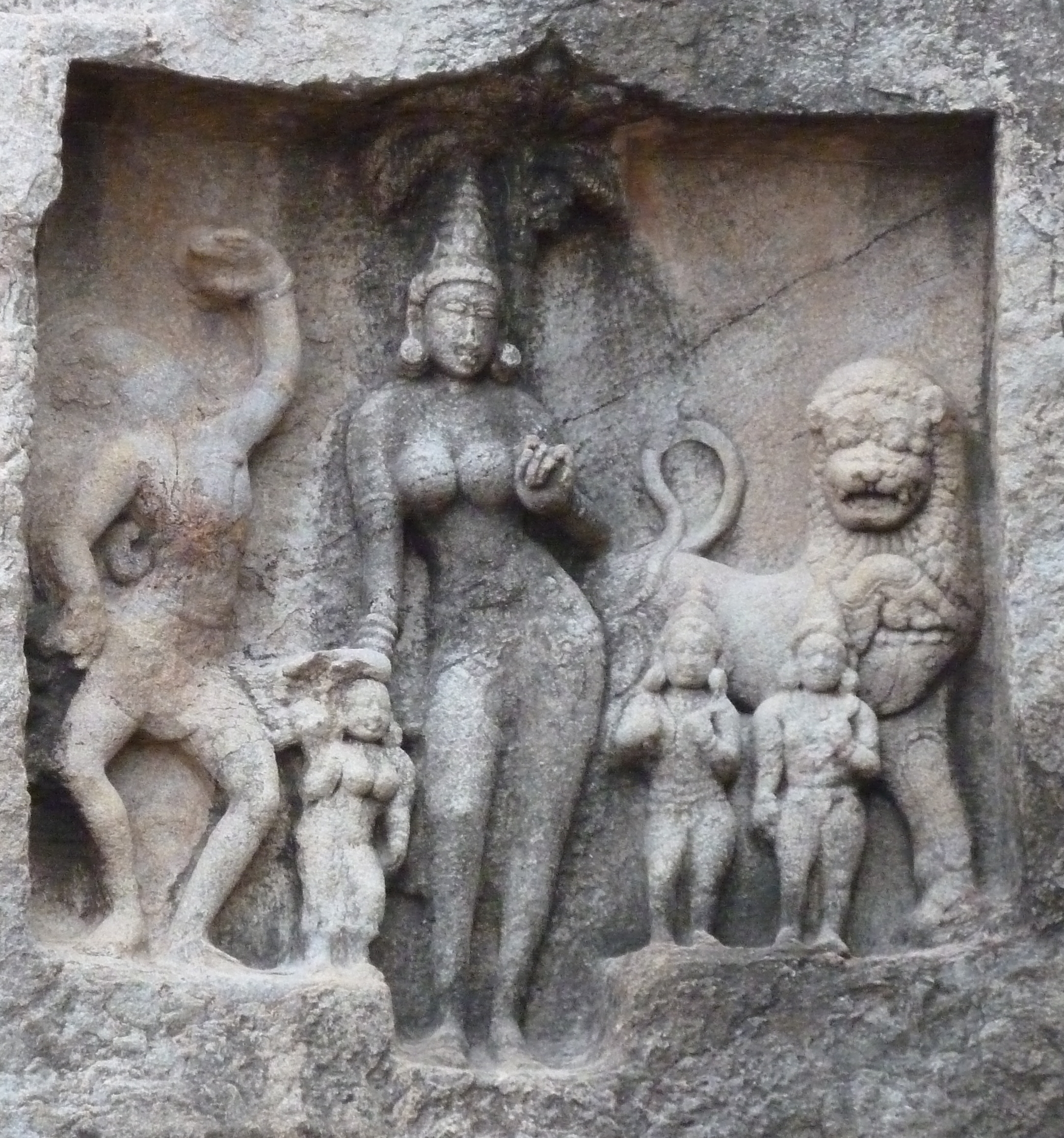
Jain Yakshini Ambika

There are 98 inscriptions related to Jainism at the Kalugumalai Jain Beds site, the largest known concentration of Jain inscriptions in far south India at a single site. These are found below the reliefs of Tirthankaras and yakshis, as well as near the hollowed out beds. Most are records of donors and gifts. Some contain information and names of mendicants, both men and women. Of the 98, 21 inscriptions (20%) in Kalugumalai mention women mendicants. This is in contrast to 8th to 13th-century Jain inscriptions found elsewhere in Tamil Nadu, where the mention of women is relatively rare to a few (0 to 4%). According to John Cort – a Jain studies scholar, Kalugumalai is an important Jain site in part because it stands out as an exception where Digambara tradition women rose to prominence over its early history. The Digambara tradition teaches rejection of all possessiveness including clothes, which leads to its mendicants living, socially interacting and traveling in complete nudity. Historic evidence of major groups of Digambara Jain women mendicants is rare, except in Kalugumalai where the local culture allowed female monastic traditions to flourish for few centuries after around the 9th, before it disappeared.

The inscriptions in Kalugumalai in combination with inscriptions found elsewhere in Tamil Nadu suggest that for these few centuries, the Tamil culture accepted and supported the female Digambara mendicants well beyond the Kalugumalai area. The female mendicants were not localized, and they traveled and preached far from Kalugumalai. This phenomenon was not unique to Jainism, states Cort, but in parallel to Hindu women mendicants who are also named in numerous religious inscriptions found in South India in a manner similar to the Kalugumalai Jain beds. However, adds Cort, the evidence suggests that female mendicants in the Hindu tradition were more regional while the female Jain mendicants traveled to more distant territories. The Kalugumalai Jain beds mention twenty one religious places where Digamabara women mendicants travelled, out of which eleven have been tentatively identified - one being Kalugumalai itself, five in Ramanathapuram district, one in Tirupanthuruthi in Kanchipuram district, four in Tirucaranam (now Chitaral) in Kanyakumari district.

According to B.S. Chandrababu, the inscriptions on these Jain beds imply that Jains promoted education in what is now Kanyakumari district between 7th and 9th-century CE. The inscriptions also attest to a Jaina university for women at Thirusaaranath hillock, states Chandrababu.

== Architecture ==
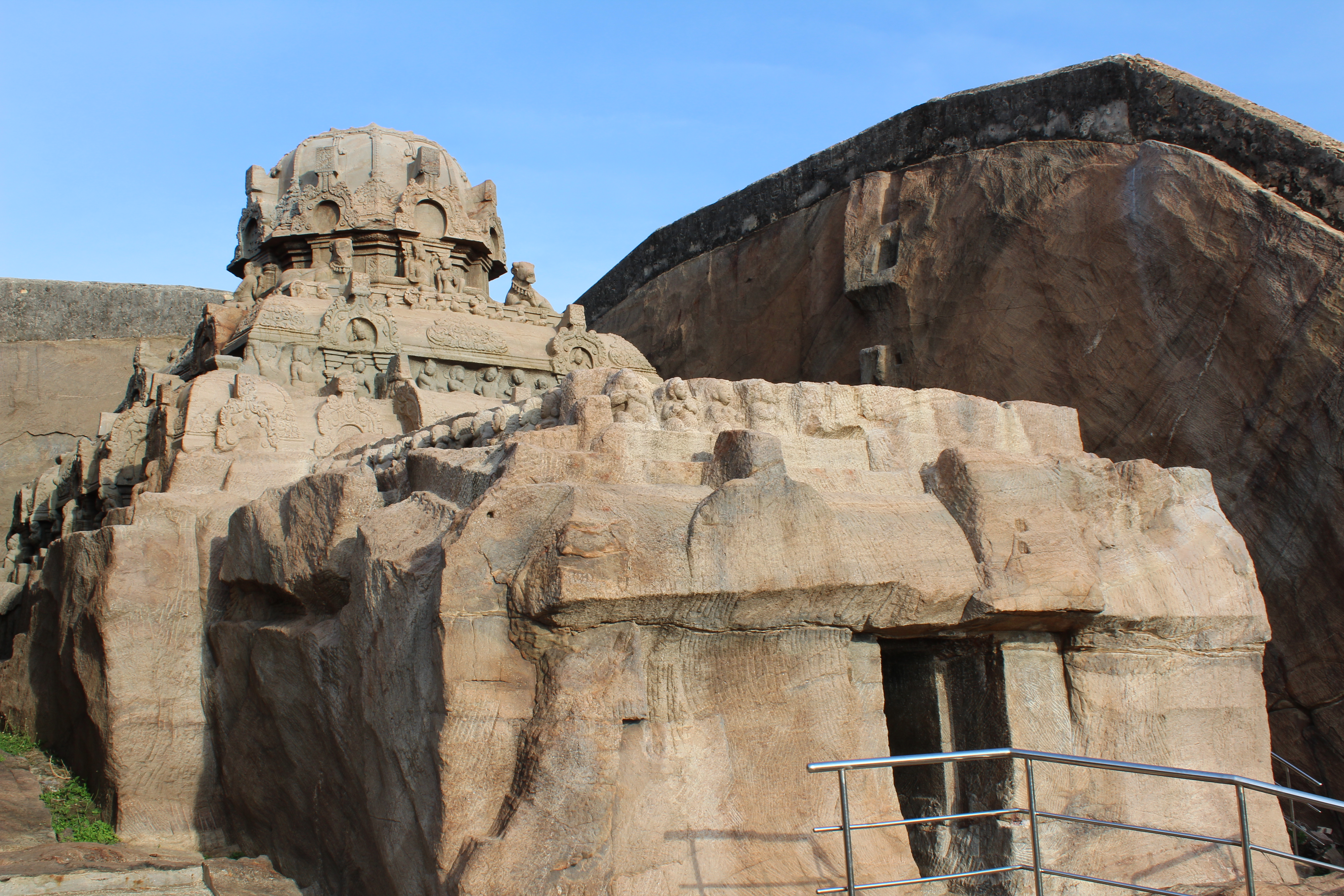
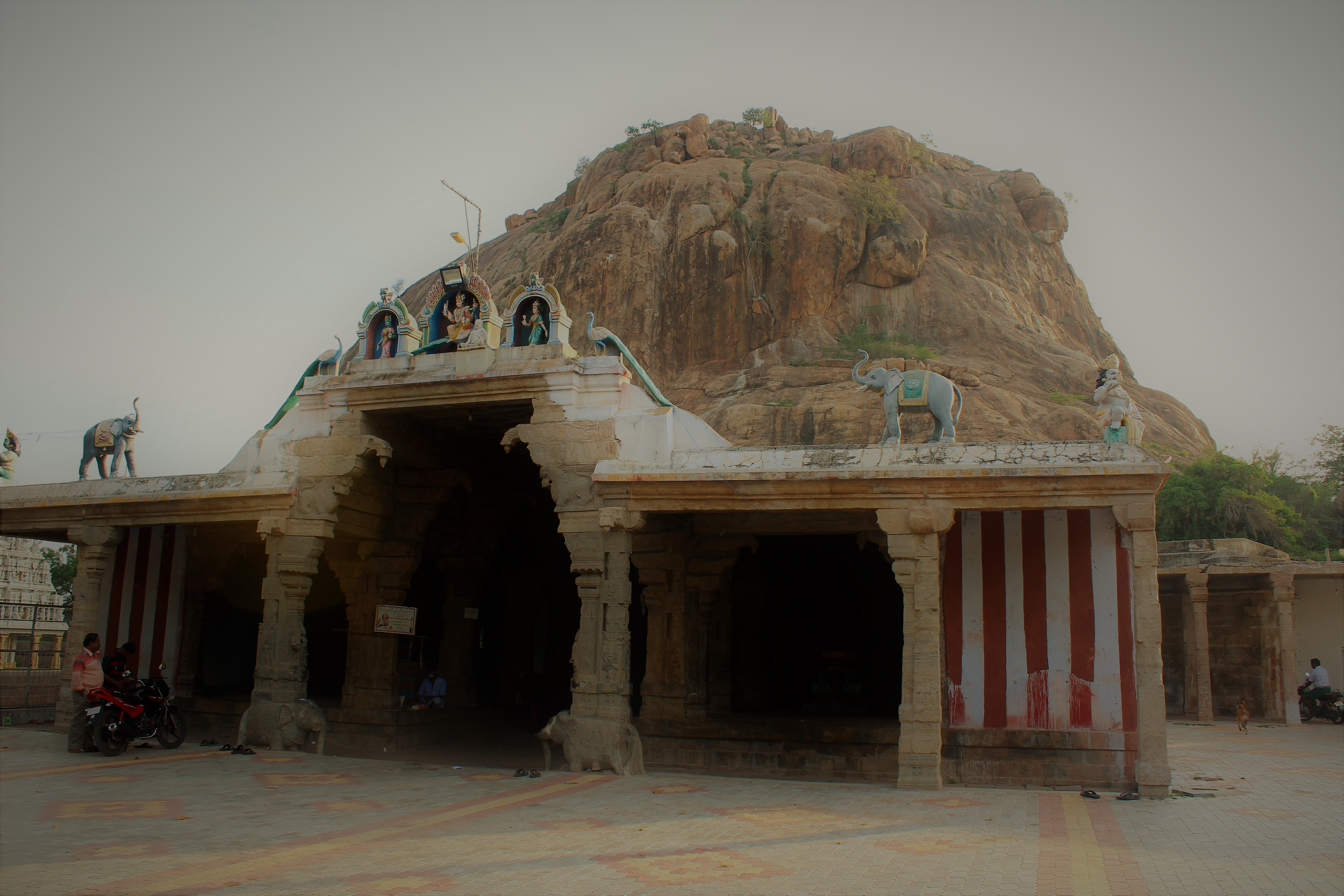
Vettuvan Koil and Kalugasalamoorthy Temple, both in Kalugumalai, in the same hill

The Jain beds site is in Kalugumalai, a rocky hill in Thoothukudi district in southern Tamil Nadu. The sculptures and the carvings are indicative of Pandyan art during the period. The granite rock looks like a blooming lotus, with hills surrounding it on three sides.

There are approximately 150 niches in the bed, that includes images of Gomateshwara, Parshvanatha and other Tirthankaras of the Jainism.

== Protection and tourism ==
Kalugumalai Jain beds is maintained and administered by Department of Archaeology of the Government of Tamil Nadu as a protected monument. Kalugumalai was chosen in the plan to be included as a rural tourism site in Incredible India campaign by the Tourism Ministry of the Government of India.

As a part of the campaign the ministry allocated ₹10 million to develop the infrastructure around the region in 2008. The tourist inflow to the town increased to 3,000 persons per month during 2009 from 400 per month during the previous years.

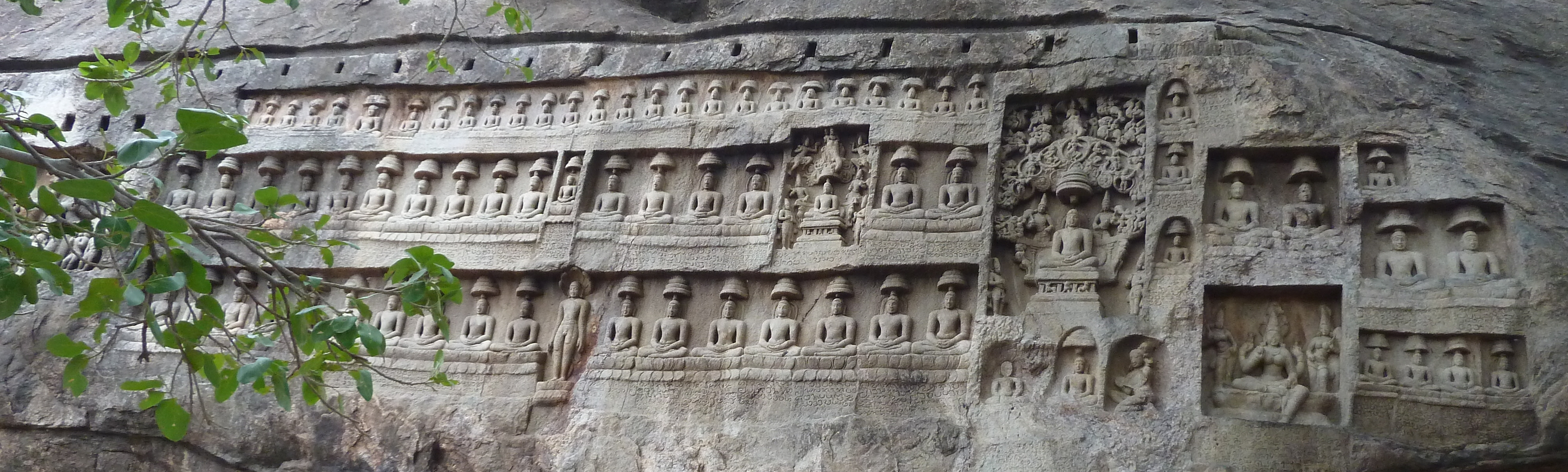
Jaina abode Kalugumalai

== Gallery ==
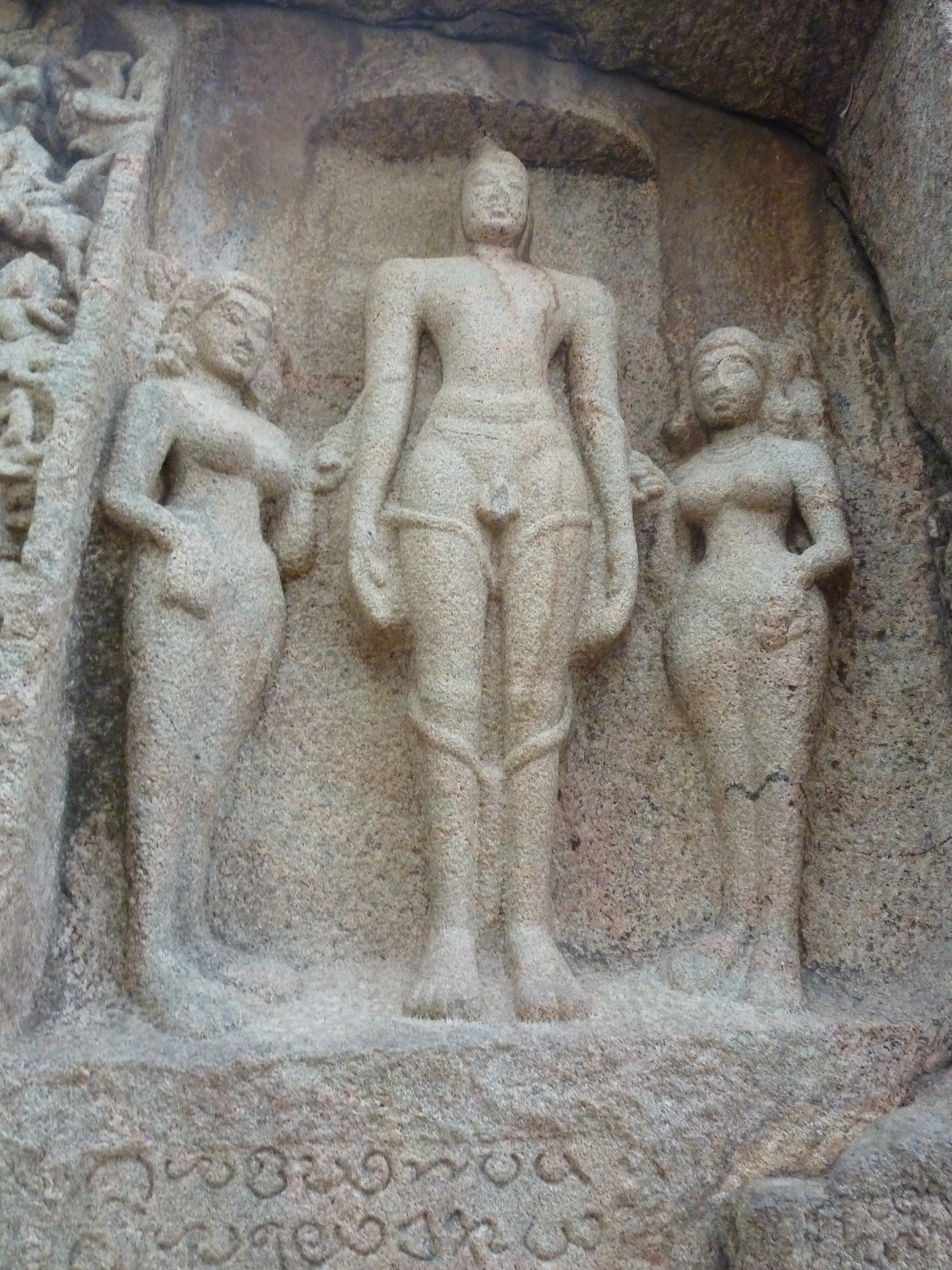
Gommaṭeśvara

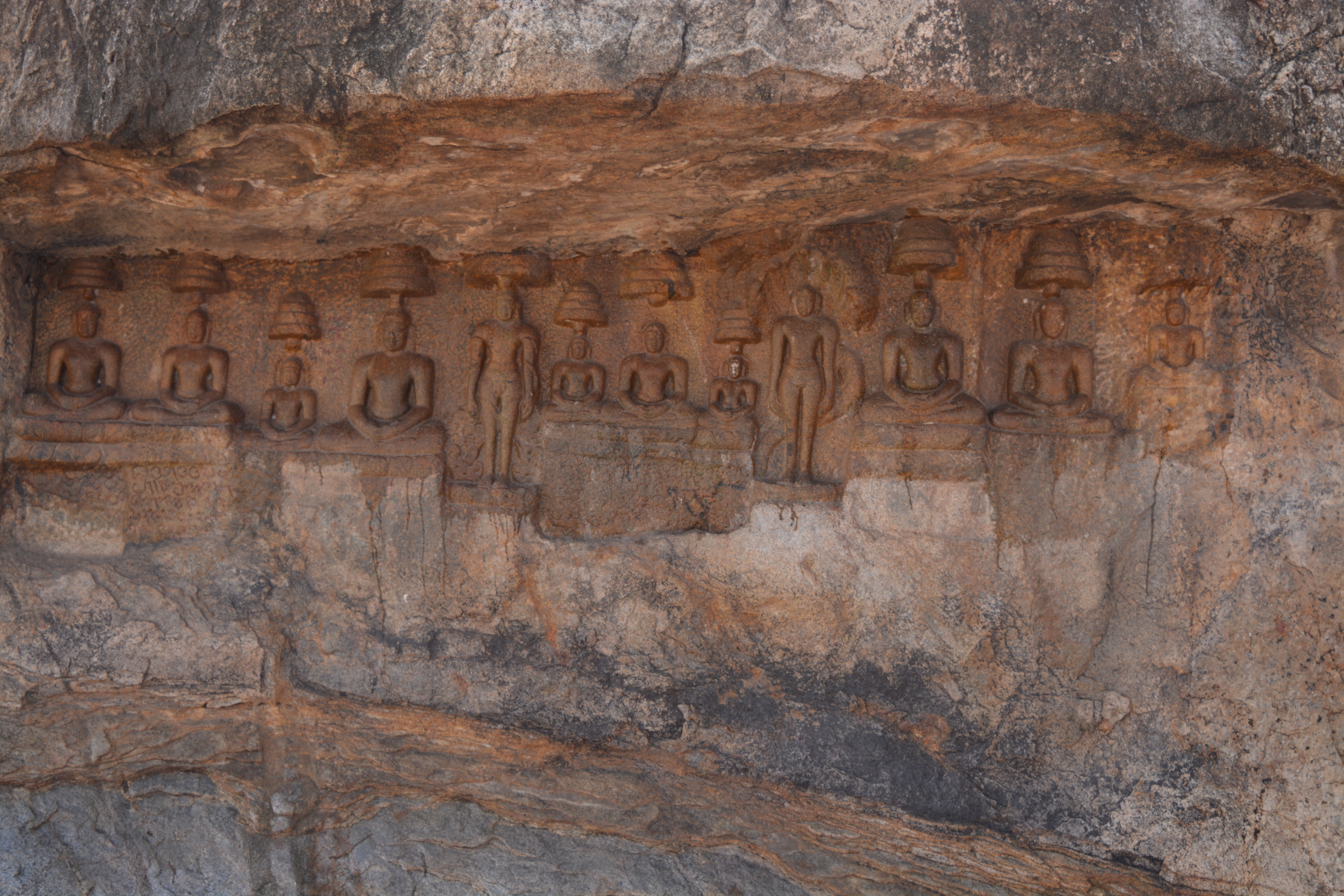
Jain reliefs

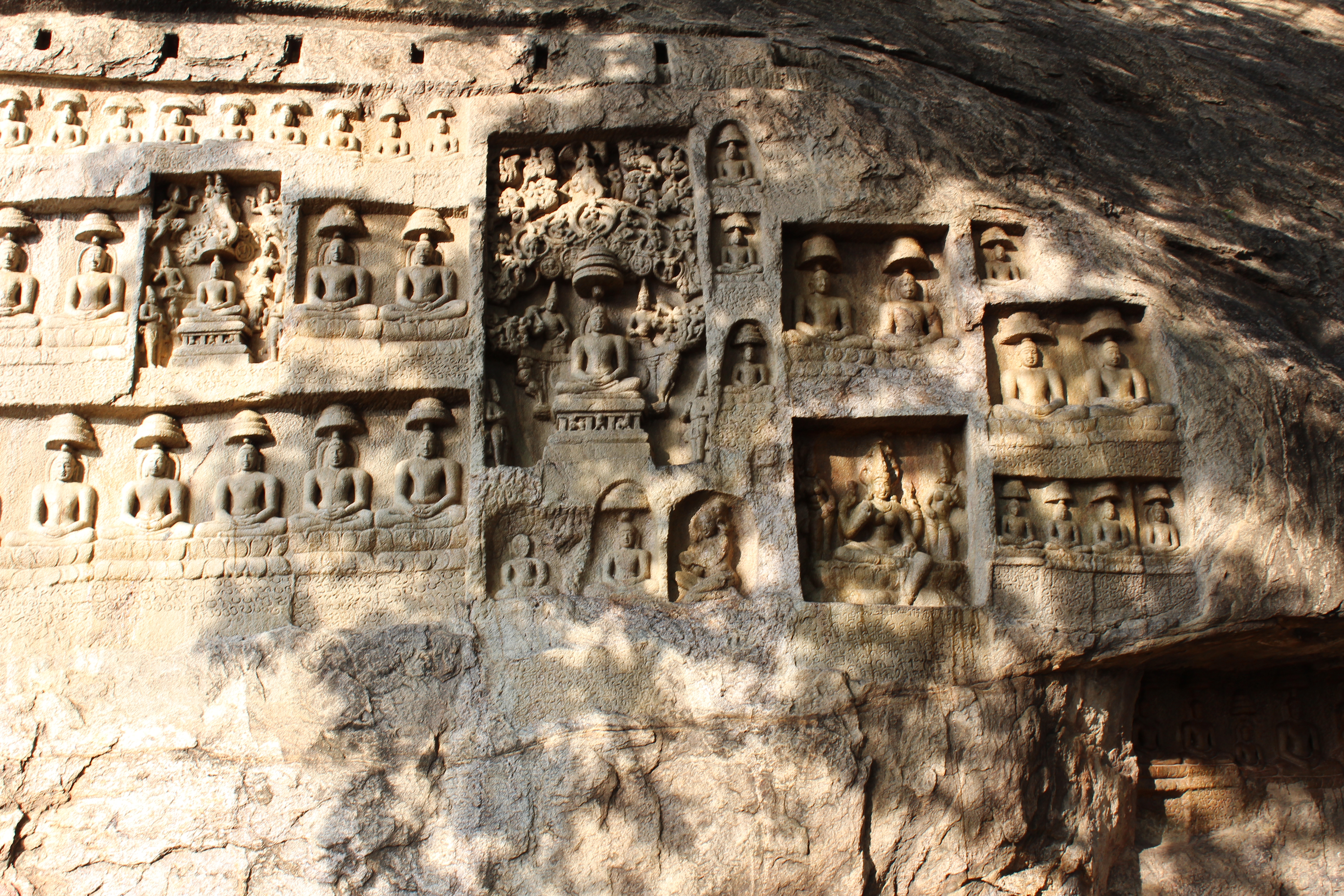
Jain reliefs

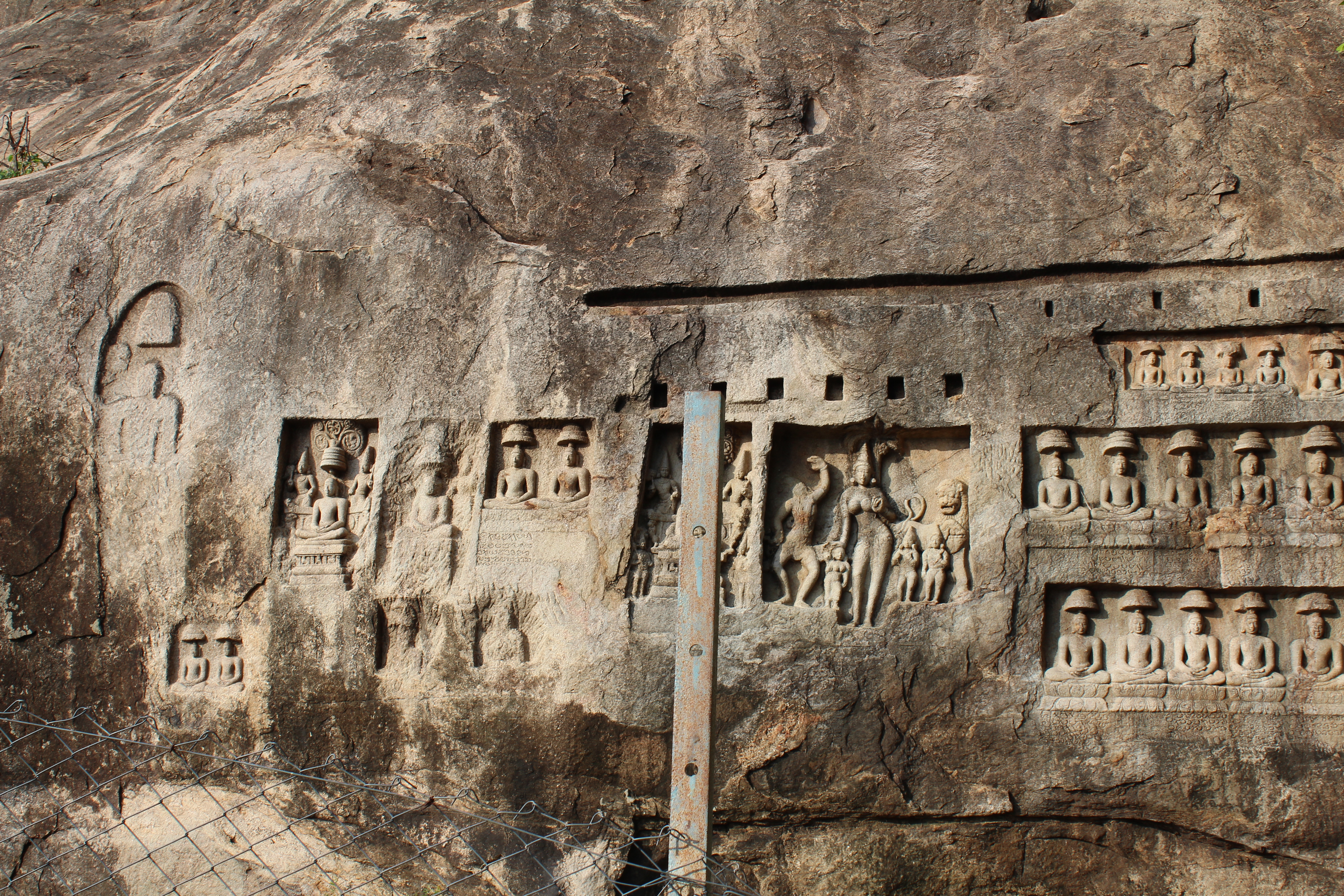
Jain reliefs

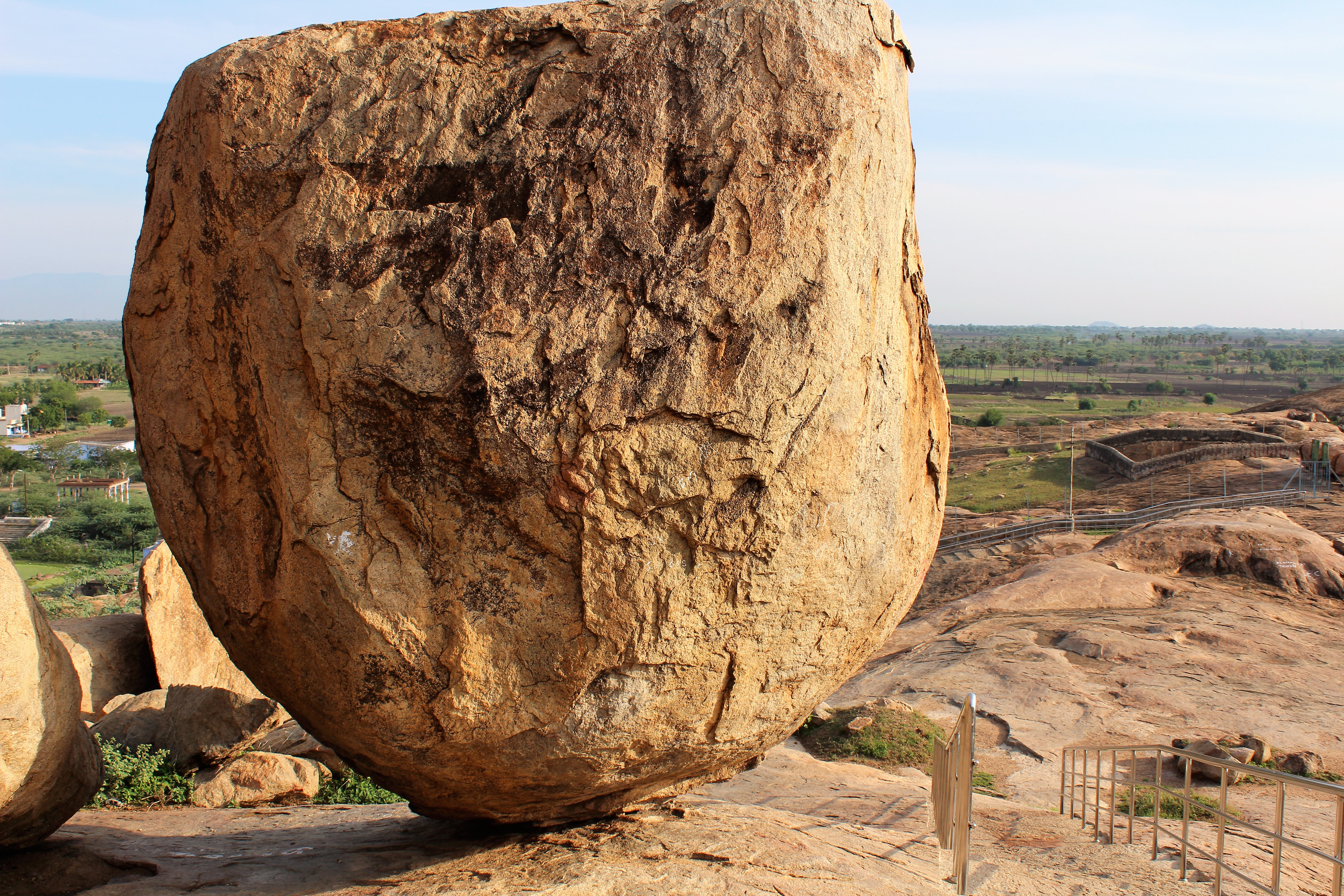
Jain reliefs

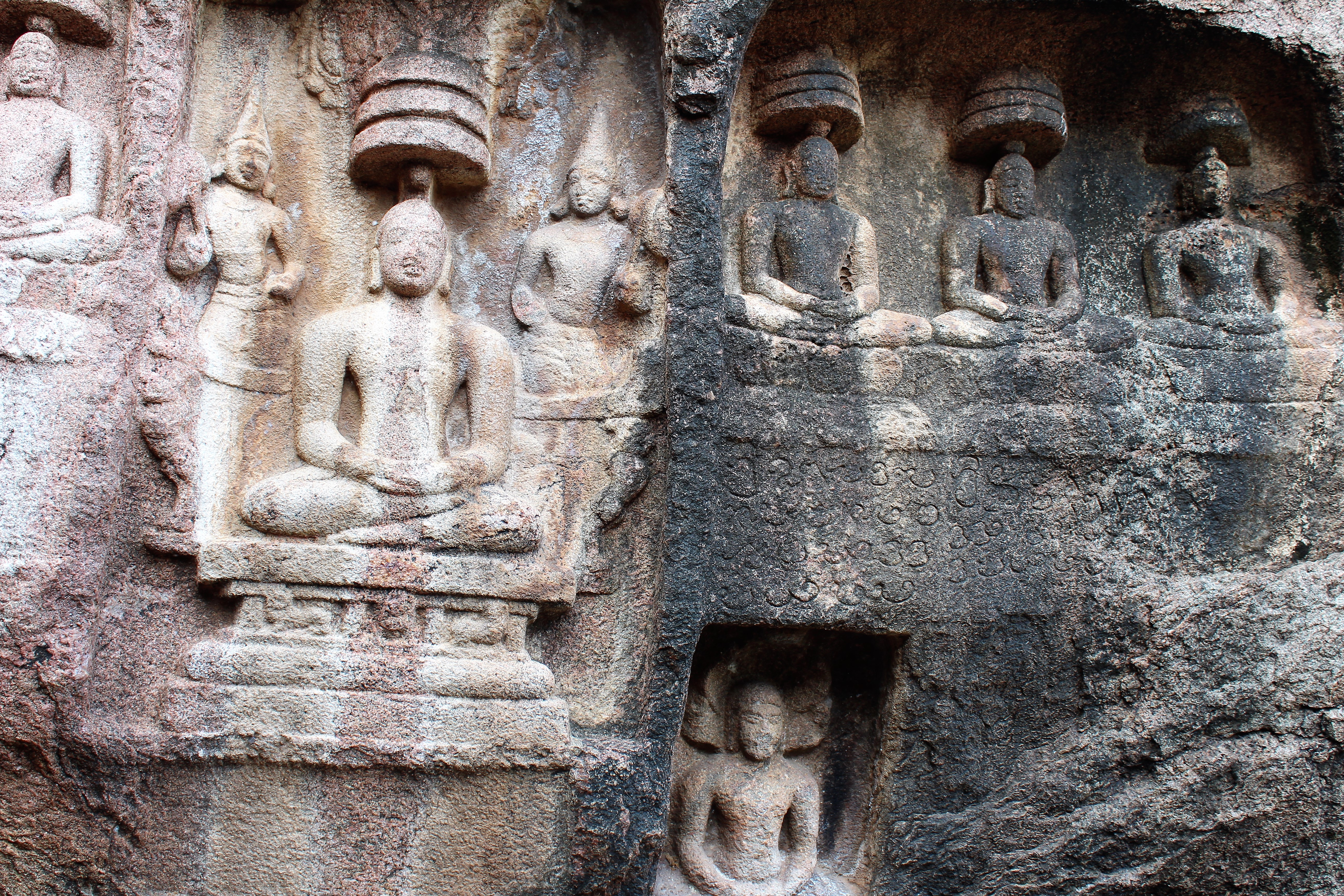
Jain reliefs

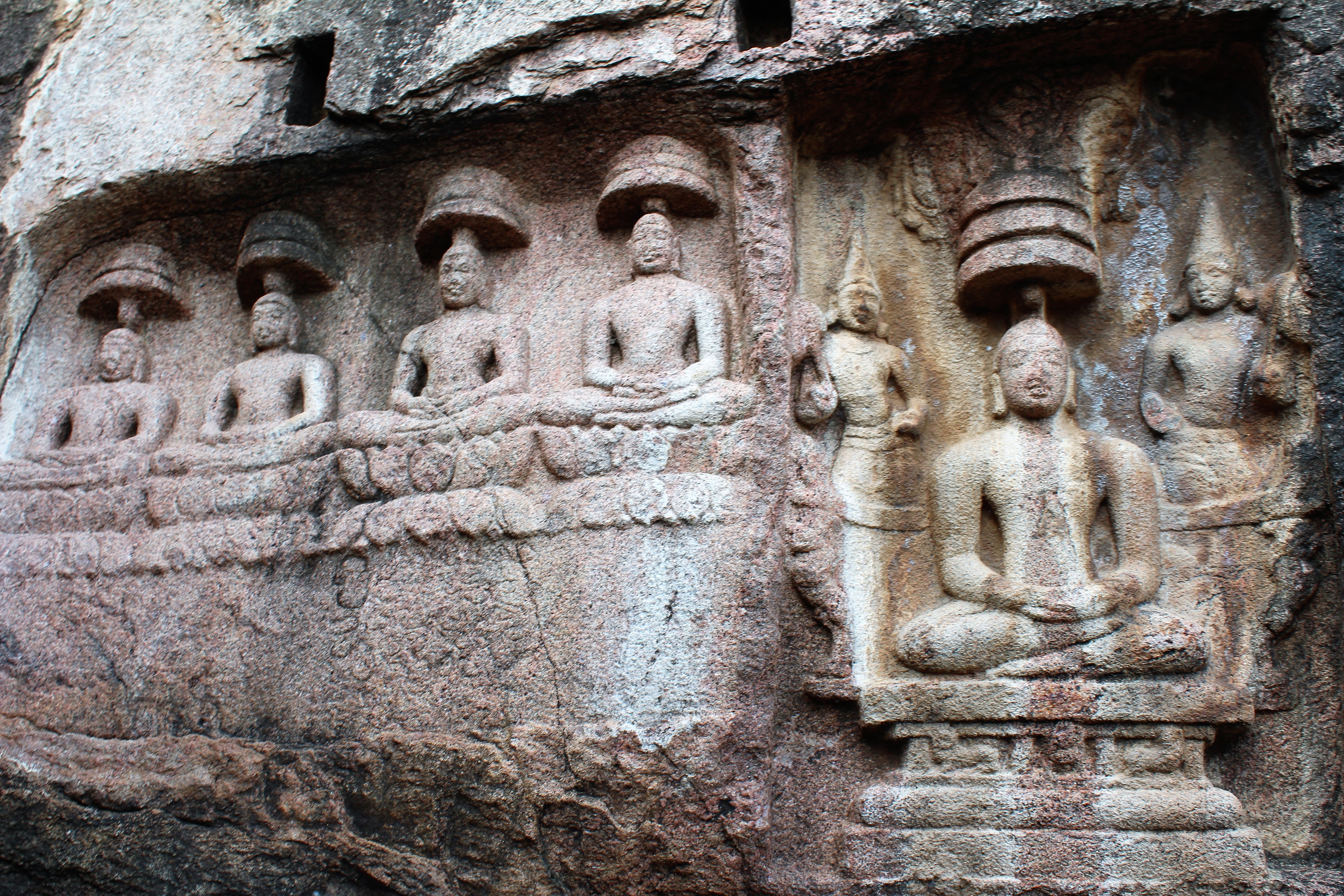
Jain reliefs

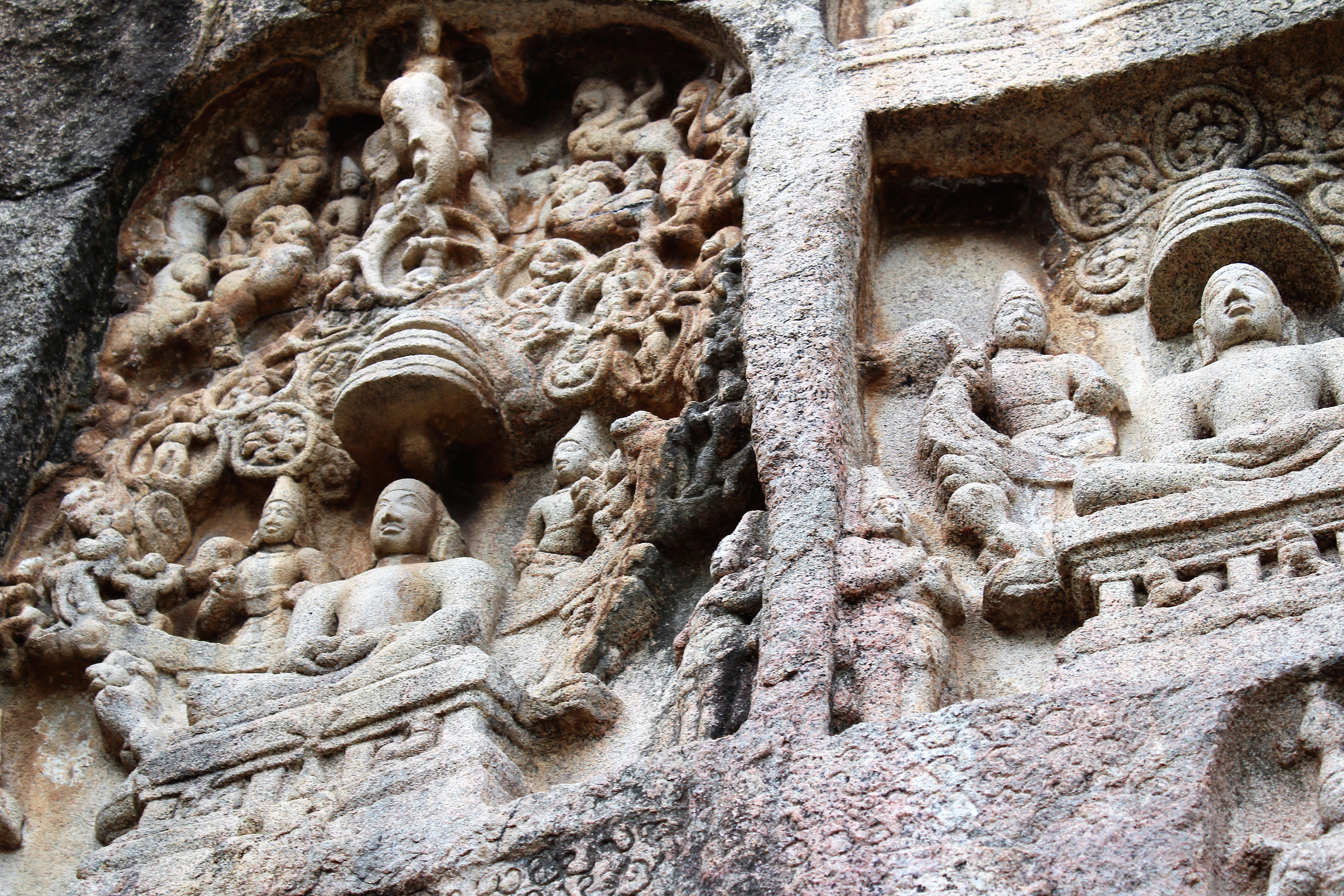
Jain reliefs

== See also ==
- Jainism in Tamil Nadu
- Bommalagutta
