= Kunnakudi Vaidyanathan =

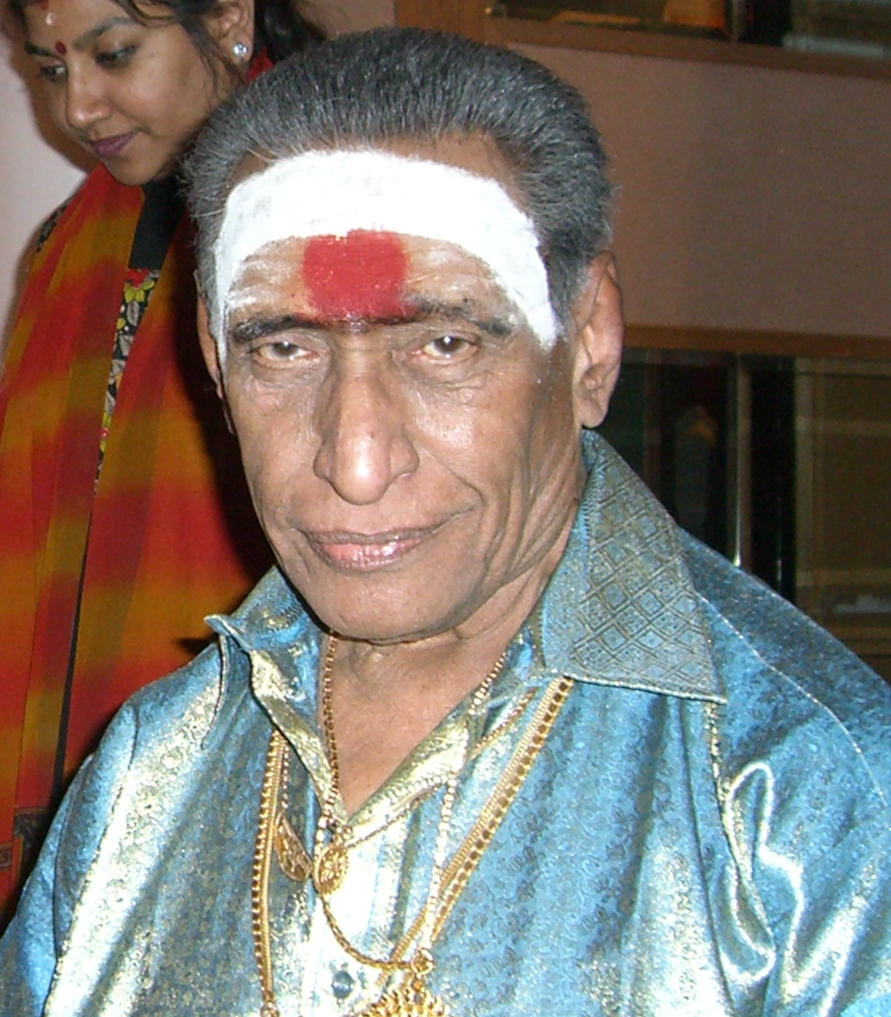
- Vaidyanathan in Kuwait, 2006

Background information
- Born: Vaidyanthan Ramaswamy Shastri; 2 March 1935; Kundrakudi, Madras Presidency, British India
- Died: 8 September 2008 (aged 73) Madras, Tamil Nadu, India
- Occupations: Carnatic musician; Music producer; Film producer; Film director; Actor
- Instrument: Carnatic Violin
- Honours: Padma Shri (2005)

Kunnakudi Vaidyanathan (2 March 1935 – 8 September 2008) was an Indian classical music violinist and music composer.

== Early life ==
Kunnakudi Vaidyanathan was born on 2 March 1935 and was trained by his father, Ramaswamy Sastry. His father, sang and played a variety of instruments such as the flute, jalatharangam and veena. He was the brother of Kunnakudi Subbalakshmi.

== Career ==
The violin was his forte. He was known for his dexterity and subtlety in handling the violin, he catered not only to the music scholar but also to the layman. His play reflected his own different moods and the demands of his audience with whom he established and enjoyed a good rapport. He dwelled with ease and competence in the high as well as the low octaves.

At the age of 12, he accompanied great stalwarts like Ariyakudi Ramanuja Iyengar, Semmangudi Srinivasa Iyer and Maharajapuram Santhanam in concerts. He also performed with Nadaswaram vidwans like T.N.Rajarathinam Pillai and Thiruvenkadu Subramania Pillai.

He stopped accompanying vocal artistes in 1976 to concentrate more on solo concerts. He was famous for his unique string control techniques on the violin. His interest in new attempts and innovations led him to work with veteran thavil vidwan Valaiyapatti A.R.Subramaniyam. They performed over 3,000 shows together. Vaidyanathan had deep faith in the therapeutic merits of music.

== Film music ==
He also made a significant contribution to Tamil devotional music. A. P. Nagarajan giving him his first break in the movie Vaa Raja Vaa. He had several hits such as Agathiyar in which Sirkazhi Govindarajan Acted as Agathiyar. And Raja Raja Chozhan(Rajaraja Cholan), for which he scored music, were also phenomenal hits.

Vaidyanathan made an uncredited appearance in the 2005 Tamil movie Anniyan directed by Shankar, on the Tyagaraja Aradhana festival sequence for the song Iyengaaru Veetu which is a recreation of the real festival. He had guest appearances in many other films.

He tried his hand at film production with a feature film in Tamil Thodi Ragam, with T. N. Seshagopalan in the lead, which failed to enthuse the audience.

== Discography ==
Their works include music for the following movies:

Year	Film	Language	Notes
1969	Vaa Raja Vaa	Tamil	Debut Film
1970	Thirumalai Thenkumari	Tamil	
1970	Namma Veettu Deivam	Tamil	
1971	Kankaatchi	Tamil	
1972	Agathiyar	Tamil	
1972	Vazhaiyadi Vazhai	Tamil	
1972	Dheivam	Tamil	
1972	Annai Abirami	Tamil	
1973	Rajaraja Cholan	Tamil	
1973	Thirumalai Deivam	Tamil	
1973	Karaikkal Ammaiyar	Tamil	
1974	Sisupalan	Tamil	
1974	Gumasthavin Magal	Tamil	
1975	Manidhanum Dheivamagalam	Tamil	
1975	Melnaattu Marumagal	Tamil	
1977	Navarathinam	Tamil	
1979	Kandhar Alangaram	Tamil	
1982	Raga Bandhangal	Tamil	
1983	Thodi Ragam	Tamil	Also Producer
1990	Ula Vantha Nila	Tamil	Produced & Directed

== Awards ==
He was awarded the prestigious "Padma Shri" title by the Indian government, Kalaimamani award, Sangeet Natak Akademi Award by the Sangeet Natak Akademi in 1993, and the Karnataka Isaignani award. He has also won Best Music Director awards for his background scores for films. He received the Sangeetha Kalasikhamani award given by "The Indian Fine Arts Society" in 1996. He also received the Tamil Nadu State Film Award for Best Music Director for the film Thirumalai Thenkumari in 1970 and the Tamil Nadu State Film Honorary Award - Raja Sando Award in 2000.

== Other associations ==
Vaidyanathan, had a long association with the All India Radio. An able administrator, Vaidyanathan served as Secretary of the Tamil Nadu Iyal Isai Nadaga Mandram. As the Secretary of Thyagabrahma Sabha, Thiruvaiyaru in Thanjavur district, he conducted the Tyagaraja Aradhana for several years. He was one of the founders and also served as president of the Raga Research Centre.

== Death ==
He died of a heart attack on September 8, 2008 at the age of 73 at Porur Ramachandra Hospital, Chennai. He was survived by his wife, four sons and one daughter. His son Shekhar is a Cellist.
