= Sornathammal =

Indian freedom fighter and social reformer

- Born: 1916
- Died: 2007 (aged 90–91)

Sornathammal (1916–2007) was an Indian freedom fighter and social reformer who actively participated in the Indian independence movement.

== Early life and family ==
Sornathammal was born in 1916 in Madurai, in the Madras Presidency. She lived in Kadachanendhal and was an active participant in the Indian National Movement.

== Contributions to the freedom struggle ==
In 1939, she led a protest advocating for the entry of Scheduled Caste individuals into the Madurai Meenakshi Amman Temple.

During the Quit India Movement, on October 2, 1942, Sornathammal, along with Lakshmi Bai Ammal, organized a women's march in Madurai. The march featured the slogan “Vellaiyane Veliyeru” (Quit India). The participants were arrested and assaulted by the police. When the women refused to sign an apology letter agreeing to abstain from future protests, they were stripped and abandoned near Alagarkoil during the night. Despite this incident, Sornathammal continued her participation in nationalist activities.

Later in 1942, she participated in the Individual Satyagraha and was imprisoned for three months. During her imprisonment, she engaged in spinning khadi, reflecting her commitment to Gandhian principles of self-reliance and nonviolent resistance.

== Death ==
Sornathammal died in 2007.
