= Kundrakudi =

Village in Sivaganga district, Tamil Nadu, India

Coordinates: 10.1150°N 78.6987°E

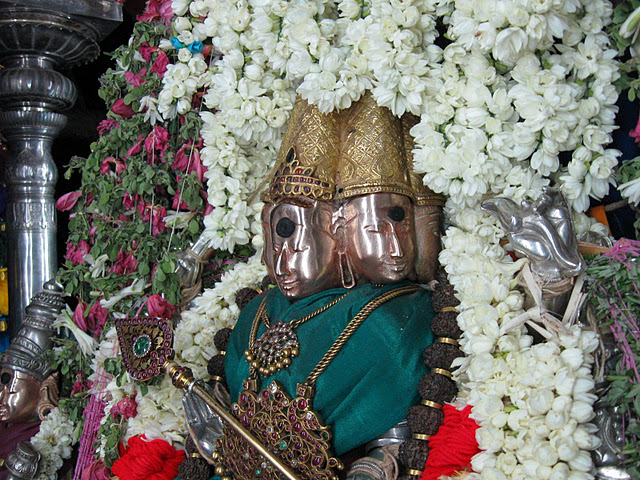
Kundrakudi shanmuganathar

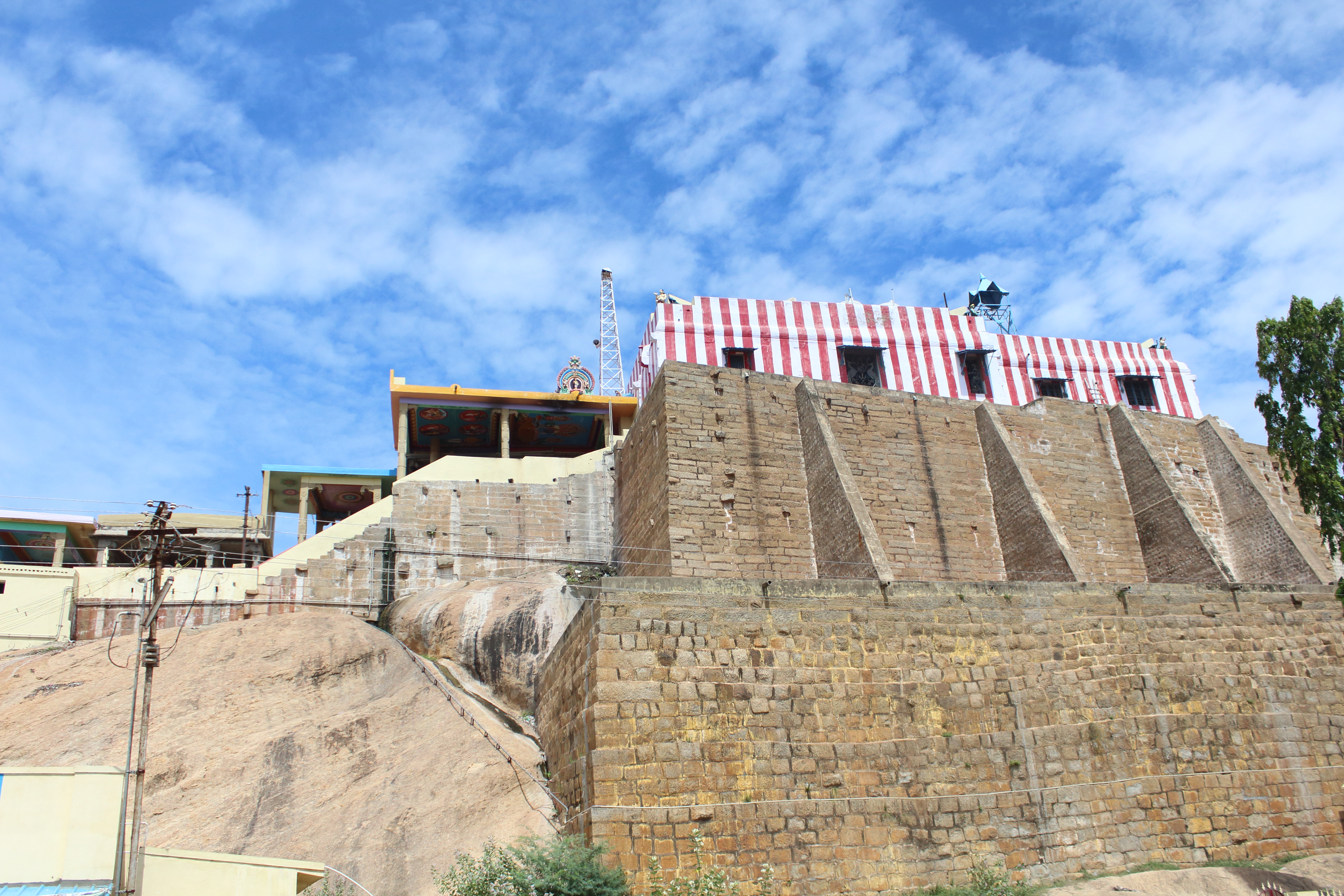
Picture of Kundrakudi Temple

Kundrakudi is a village in Sivaganga district that houses a famous Murugan temple, Shanmughanathar Temple, atop a small hill near Karaikudi, India. The place is also known as Kunnakudi.

== Location and places of interest ==
Kundrakudi is situated very near to Karaikudi, the heartland of Chettinadu. Many famous temples such as Pillayar patti Karpaga Vinayagar Temple, Bhairavar Kovil Bhairavar Swamy Temple, Nemam koil, Ariyakudi Thiruvenkatamudayan Temple, Thirupathur Thiruthalinathar Temple, Thirukostiyur Sowmyanarayar Temple are very near to Kundrakudi.
